= Rosyth =

Port town in Scotland

Coordinates: 56.03388°N 3.43226°W

Rosyth: Scottish Gaelic: Ros Fhìobh
- Town and Garden City
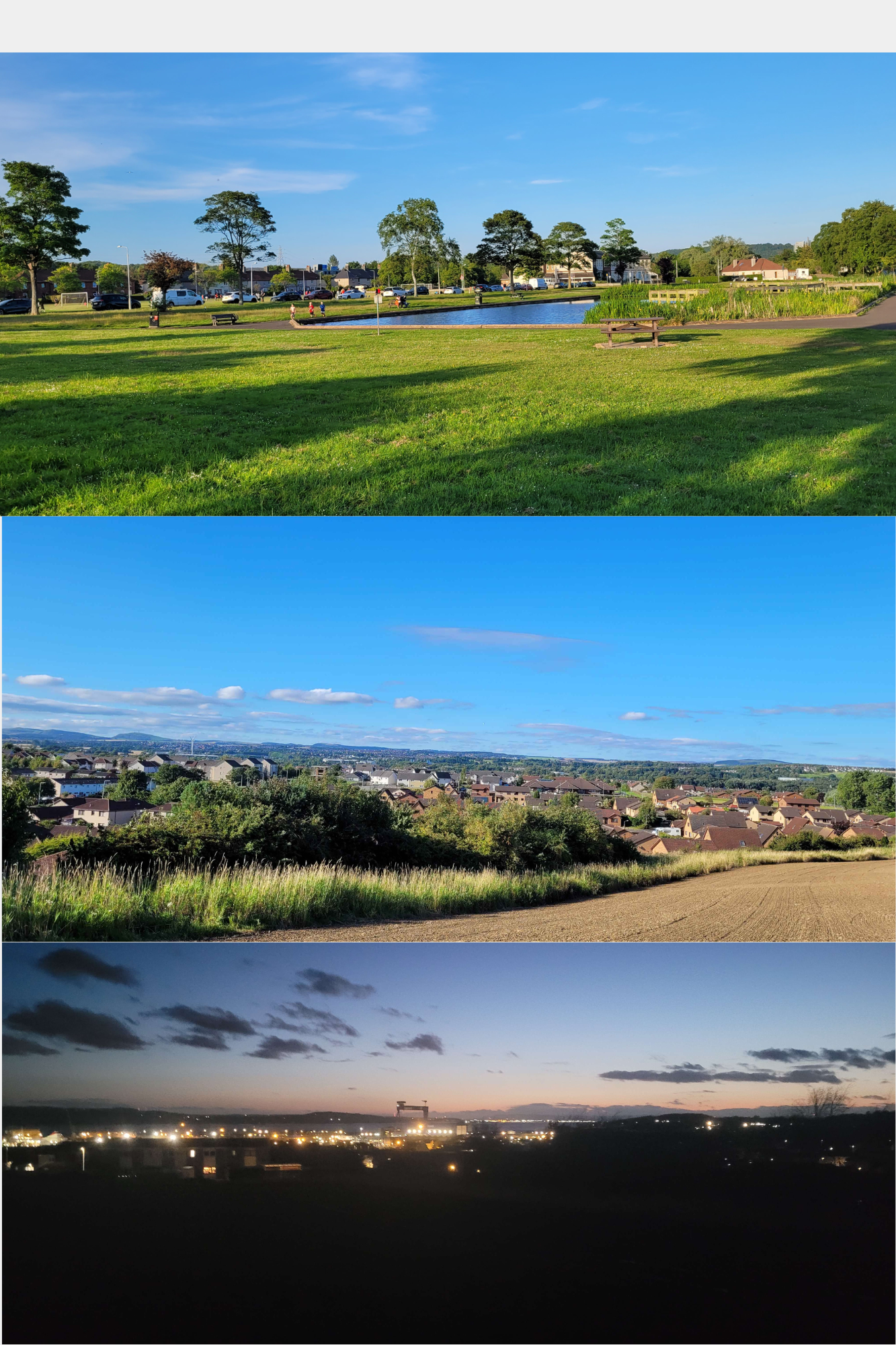
- Rosyth Park, Rosyth from Inverkeithing & Rosyth from Castland Hill

- Location within Fife
- Area: 3.2 sq mi (8.3 km^{2})
- Population: 13,570 (2020)
  - Density: 4,241/sq mi (1,637/km^{2})
- OS grid reference: NT108831
  - Edinburgh: 10.5 mi (16.9 km) S
  - London: 340 mi (550 km) S
- Council area: Fife
- Lieutenancy area: Fife
- Country: Scotland
- Sovereign state: United Kingdom
- Post town: DUNFERMLINE
- Postcode district: KY11
- Dialling code: 01383
- Police: Scotland
- Fire: Scottish
- Ambulance: Scottish
- UK Parliament: Dunfermline and Dollar
- Scottish Parliament: Cowdenbeath

Rosyth /rəˈsaɪθ/ (Scottish Gaelic: Ros Fhìobh) is a medium-sized town and Garden City in the historic region of Fife, Scotland, on the coast of the Firth of Forth.

Scotland's first Garden City, Rosyth is a large part of the Greater Dunfermline Area, with only the A823(M) motorway separating the two large communities. located about 3 miles south of Dunfermline city centre and 10 miles northwest of Edinburgh city centre. To the west of Rosyth lies Limekilns and to the east lies Inverkeithing.

Rosyth was designed to have shops and pubs just a short distance from home; due to this, there is no main street or high street but several central areas along Queensferry Road and Castlandhill Road.

Rosyth was founded along with the finished construction of Rosyth Dockyard in March 1916, built as a naval base for World War I battleships to protect the North Sea. Rosyth played a key role in World War II defending the North Sea, especially during the German occupation of Norway. It was then redeveloped to maintain submarines and serve as a port and business park.

Rosyth is near the narrowest crossing point of the Firth of Forth, so it has long been strategically important, evidenced by the 15th-century Rosyth Castle. Rosyth is home to 12 Historic Scotland listed buildings as well as sections of long-distance footpaths, the Fife Coastal Path and the Fife Pilgrim Way.

Today, Rosyth is a suburban commuter town of Edinburgh and Dunfermline. Rosyth Railway Station is on the Fife Circle Line and the town is bypassed by the M90 motorway. Rosyth has a population of 13,570 (2020), making the town the 5th largest in Fife.

== Governance ==
Rosyth is within the Cowdenbeath constituency of the Scottish Parliament, currently held by Annabelle Ewing of the Scottish National Party, as well as the Mid Scotland and Fife electoral region.

For the UK Parliament, Rosyth is located in the Dunfermline and Dollar constituency and is represented by Graeme Downie of the Labour Party, who won election in the 2024 General Election.

Rosyth has three representatives on Fife Council: Brian Goodall (Scottish National Party), Tony Jackson (Scottish National Party) and Andrew Verrecchia (Labour Party).

== Dockyard and military ==
Rosyth is best known for its large Naval Dockyard, formerly the Royal Naval Dockyard Rosyth. The town was planned as a garden city with accommodation for the construction workers and dockyard workers. Today, the dockyard is almost 2.2 square kilometres (0.85 sq mi) in size, a large proportion of which was reclaimed during construction.

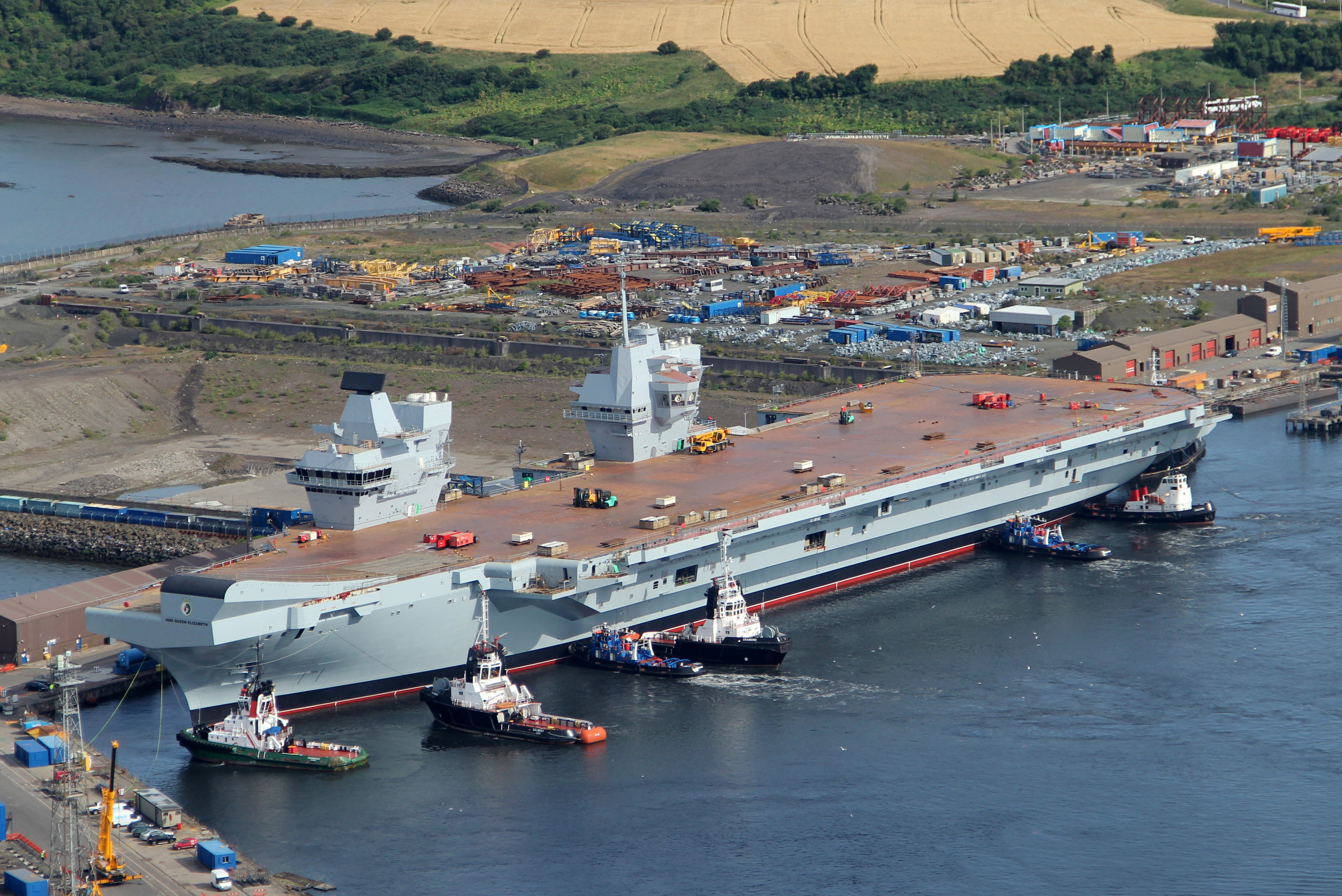
Picture of Rosyth Dockyard - HMS Queen Elizabeth

Rosyth, Inverkeithing and nearby Charlestown were major centres of shipbreaking activity, notably the salvage of much of the German fleet scuttled at Gutter Sound, Scapa Flow, the Cunard Line's RMS Mauretania, and the White Star Line's RMS Olympic.

The associated military naval base closed in 1994, and no Royal Navy ships are permanently based at Rosyth, though some ships now return for docking and refit activities, including Sandown-class minehunters and Queen Elizabeth-class aircraft carriers.

Rosyth's dockyards became the first in the Royal Navy to be privatised when Babcock International acquired the site in 1987. The privatisation followed almost eighty years of contribution to the defence of the United Kingdom which spanned two World Wars and the Cold War with the Soviet Union, during which Rosyth became a key nuclear submarine maintenance establishment.

When the final submarine refit finished in 2003, a project to undertake early nuclear decommissioning of the submarine refit and allied facilities – Project RD83 – began pre-planning. The project was funded by Ministry of Defence, in accordance with the contractual agreement in place following the sale of the dockyard, but management and sub-contracting was the responsibility of the dockyard owner, Babcock Engineering Services. The main decommissioning sub-contractor was Edmund Nuttall Limited.

Work began in 2006 and was finished in 2010. The project completed ahead of programme and under-budget, which is unusual in nuclear decommissioning activities. Notably some nuclear liabilities do remain at Rosyth Dockyard.

The dockyard was the site for final assembly of the two Queen Elizabeth-class aircraft carriers for the Royal Navy's future carrier project.

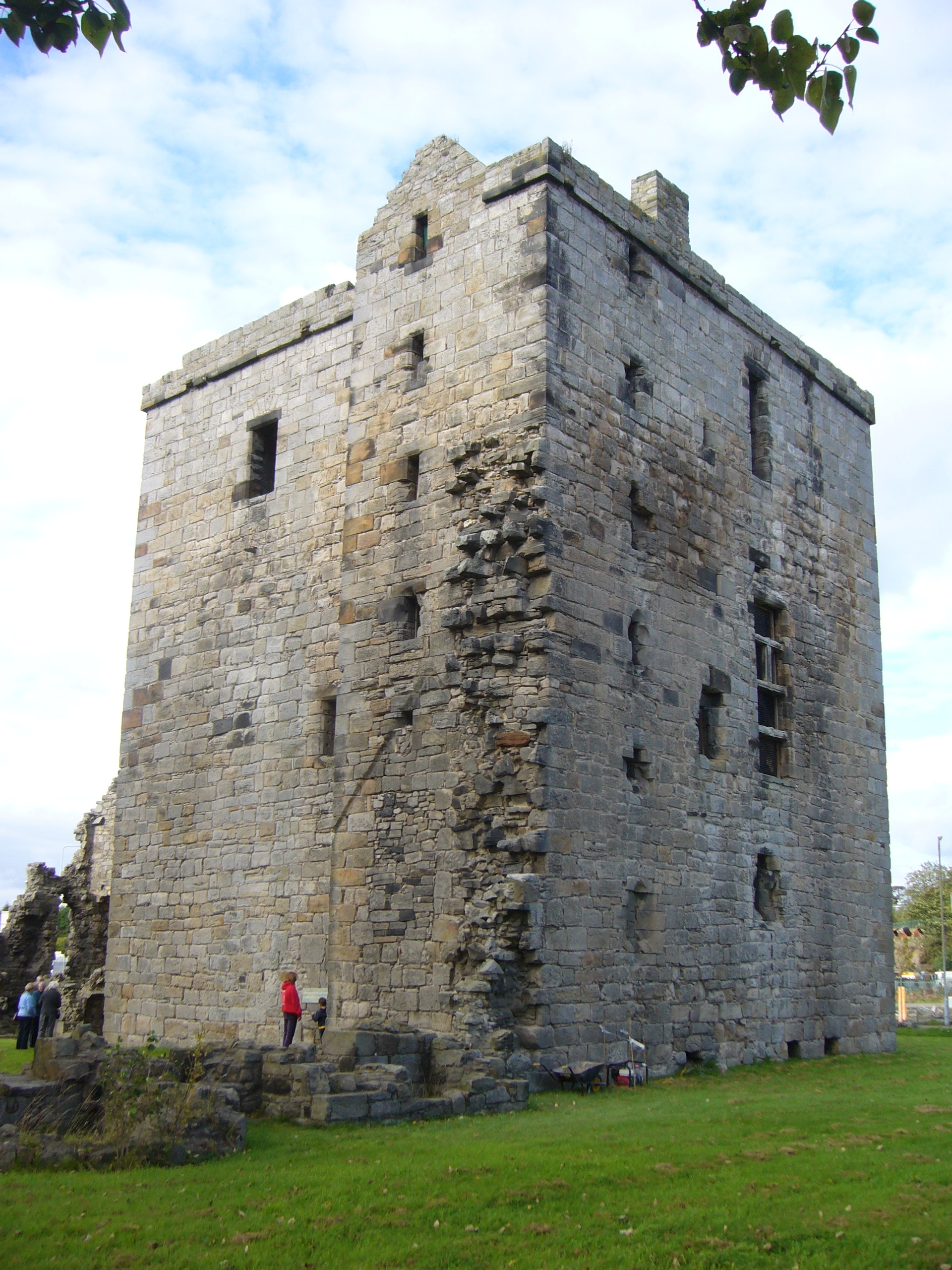
Rosyth Castle

=== Military installations ===
A number of Ministry of Defence establishments and military bases are located both in and around the Naval dockyard at Rosyth.

In November 2016 the UK Government announced that MoD Caledonia would close in 2022. On 1 April 2023 it was renamed HMS Caledonia and its future is assured.

There are Sea, Army and Air Cadets located in Rosyth. The Sea and Air cadets are located in the Naval Dockyard inside both HMS Scotia and HMS Caledonia, whereas the Army cadets is located next to Park Road Primary School on Middlebank Street.

=== International links ===
Starting in 2002, an overnight ferry service linked Rosyth with Zeebrugge in Belgium. This service was discontinued by Superfast Ferries in September 2008, but recommenced in May 2009 under new operator Norfolkline. They ran three sailings a week in each direction.

Norfolkline was taken over by DFDS Seaways, who subsequently reduced the service to freight-only, three sailings a week in each direction. The service was terminated in 2018 following a fire aboard one of the ships.

In June 2022, it was reported that talks were underway to restore the ferry route, with DFDS operating a freight service from early 2023, with passenger service expected by summer 2023, however as of 2024 this is yet to start.

In 2025/2026 a new Rosyth-Dunkirk ferry route was proposed however as of October 2026 this has been cancelled or postponed despite funding from both the Scottish government and the UK government.

== Building Rosyth ==
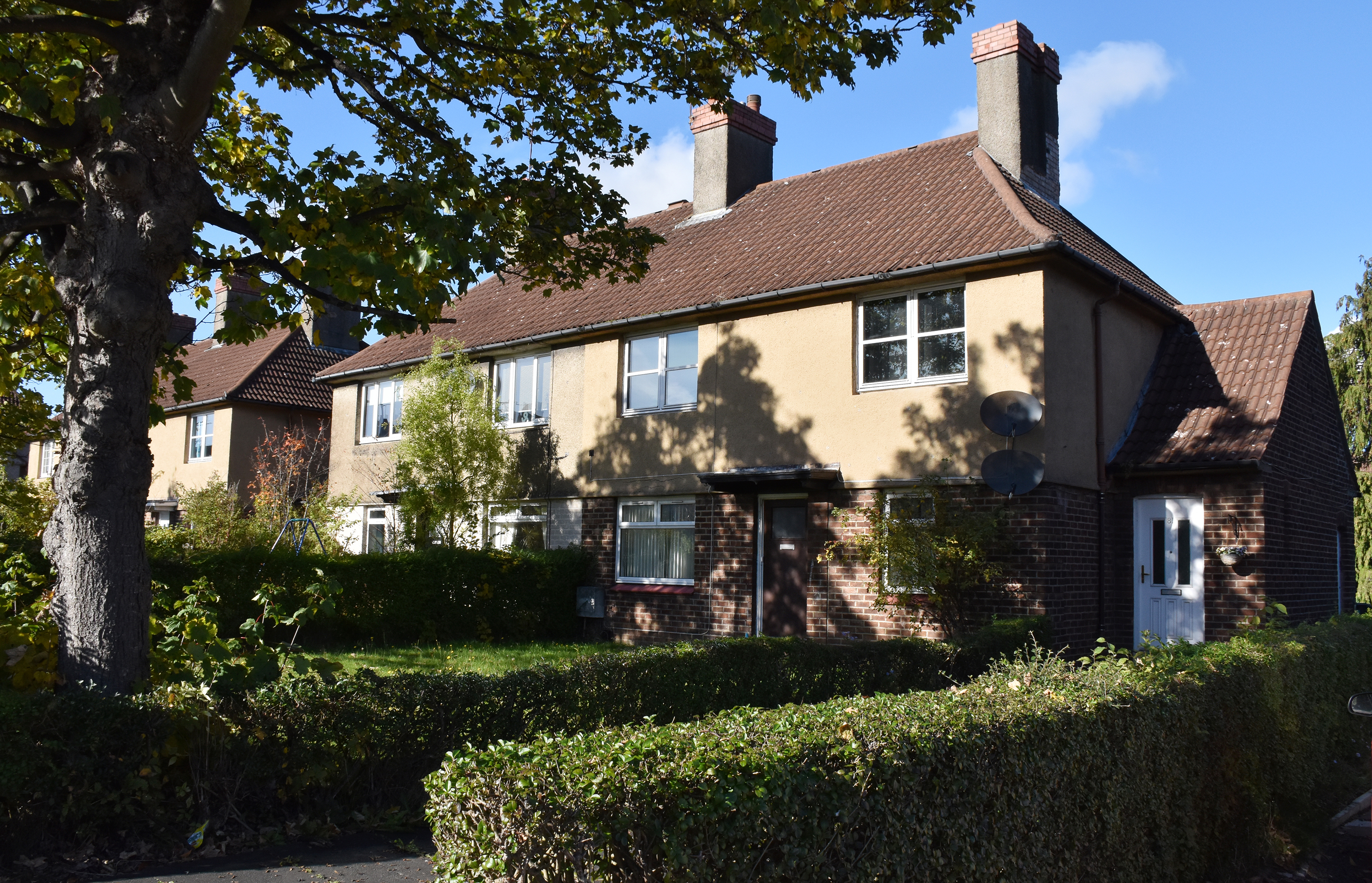
Garden-city style houses in Admiralty Road, Rosyth. Built by the SNHC.

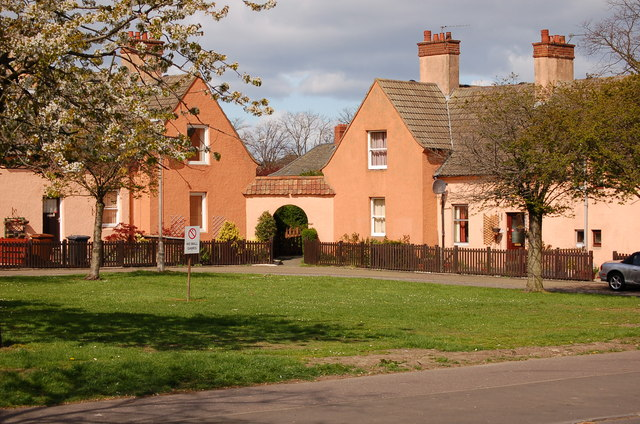
Houses in Rosyth

The fifteenth century Rosyth Castle stands on the perimeter of the dockyard complex, at the entry to the ferry terminal, and was once surrounded by the Firth of Forth on almost all sides, until land reclamation by the docks in the early 1900s.

The Scottish National Housing Company (SNHC) was a public utility company set up in 1915 to provide houses for employees at Rosyth naval dockyard; shares were taken by Dunfermline town council with the Public Works Loan Board lending the money. Work on building housing for the dockyard workers had been delayed due to disagreements between the Admiralty and Dunfermline council about who should take financial responsibility (1909–15). Some workers were accommodated in temporary huts called East and West Bungalow village and nicknamed 'tin town'.

From the first proposals for a new settlement at Rosyth, it was suggested it should be developed along Garden City lines. The town planning scheme was passed in 1915 and the first houses were occupied in 1916. Raymond Unwin was appointed advisor to the Admiralty. Rosyth became the largest of the permanent First World War housing schemes in Scotland. Unwin's assistant Alfred Hugh Mottram worked on the layout and became the SNHC's main architect, designing over 1,400 cottage-style houses. Mottram also designed the B-listed Rosyth Parish Church (1930).

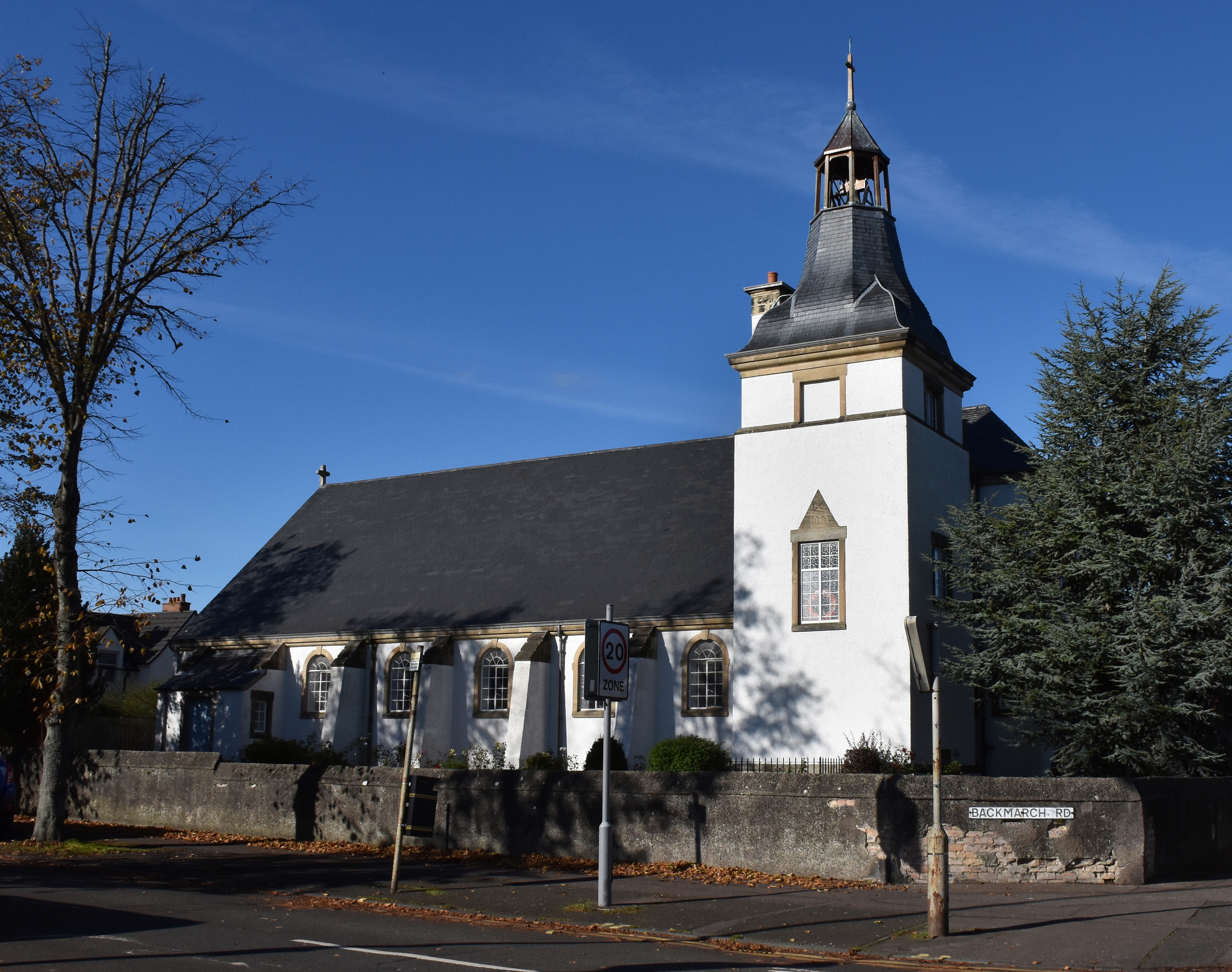
B-listed Rosyth parish church designed for the Garden suburb by Hugh A Mottram in 1930.

== Economic redevelopment ==
Scottish Enterprise Fife is now working in partnership with various private sector organisations to explore the future development of Rosyth. The agency is looking at ways to expand the ferry services to other European and domestic ports. It also wants to help create new business infrastructure in and around Rosyth – which in turn will bring economic benefits to Fife and beyond.

The main dock area – operated by Forth Ports – is ripe for further development. Since opening in 1997, the port has seen rising timber and cargo vessels use the facility. Its warehouse and logistics facilities make an ideal choice for exporters and importers.

A private developer owned site was developed into an £80 million business park – called Rosyth Europarc. More than 13,000 m^{2} (140,000 sq ft) of office and hi-tech manufacturing have already been developed. Companies like Intelligent Finance and Bank of Scotland are on site. To complement these developments, a new £8.4 million road was built to provide an enhanced link to the nearby M90 motorway.

== Transport ==
The M90 motorway and A823(M) motorway bypass the town which link Rosyth to Dunfermline, Perth, and Kinross to the north, as well as South Queensferry and Edinburgh to the south.

The main road going through Rosyth is the A985 which links the town with Inverkeithing, Dalgety Bay to the east as well as the Kincardine Bridge to the west which links the town to Falkirk, Stirling and Glasgow.

There are plans to build a new "Park and Choose" facility in Rosyth next to Rosyth railway station which would allow more bus and train connections as well as take pressure off of Halbeath in Dunfermline and Ferrytoll in Inverkeithing's Park and ride bus stations. It could potentially bring new routes to Rosyth and increase passengers. However as of October 2026, there has been no new information about this despite new bus connections from Ember.

=== Train connections ===
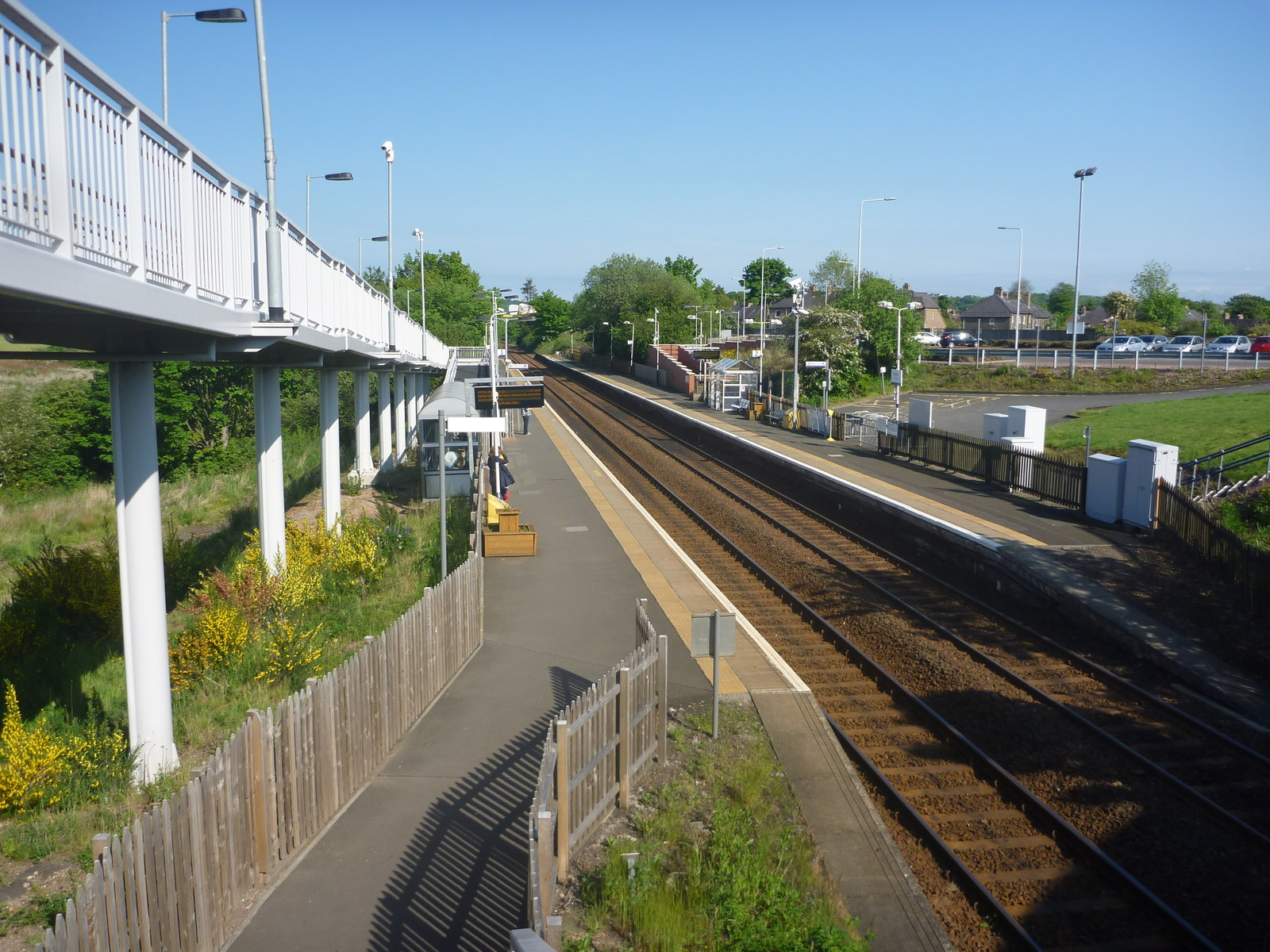
Rosyth railway station.

There is one Train Station in Rosyth in the extreme north of the town - Rosyth railway station. It is a part of the Fife Circle Line and mainly serves two train routes towards:

- Glenrothes with Thornton (Stopping in Dunfermline City, Dunfermline Queen Margaret, Cowdenbeath, Lochgelly, and Cardenden)
- Edinburgh Waverley (Stopping in Inverkeithing, North Queensferry, Dalmeny, Edinburgh Gateway, South Gyle, and Haymarket).
- Leven (Stopping in Dunfermine City, Dunfermline Queen Margaret, Cowdenbeath, Lochgelly, Cardenden, Glenrothes with Thornton, and Cameron Bridge
- Once a day near midnight (Except on Sundays when it is at 7:23pm), there is a train towards Perth (which stops in the same stops as the Glenrothes route as well as Markinch and Ladybank)

=== Bus connections ===
There are bus connections connecting Rosyth with various places in Scotland.

Stagecoach South Scotland connections:

- X51 to Dunfermline - X51 to Livingston
- X55 to Dunfermline - X55 to Edinburgh
- 7 / 7A to Dunfermline - 7 / 7A to Kirkcaldy and Leven
- 7B / 7C / 7D to Kelty - 7B / 7C to Dalgety Bay - 7D to North Queensferry
- 6A to Dunfermline / Crombie / Steelend / Ferrytoll
- 19 to Ballingry (sometimes Lochgelly or Cowdenbeath) - 19 to Rosyth / Rosyth Dockyard
- 88 / 88A to Inverkeithing - 88 / 88A to Kincardine

Ember Coaches:

There are Ember Coach busses running all day and all night to Dundee (stops in Kinross, Bridge of Earn and Perth) and Edinburgh including the terminal at Edinburgh Airport at night, during the day it stops at Ingliston Park and Ride and includes a free one stop tram to the airport terminal with the ticket. As of November 2024, a new service between Aberdeen and Edinburgh opened linking the town directly to Aberdeen with stops being the same as the Dundee route and additionally; Forfar, Brechin, Drumlithie, Newtonhill, and Portlethen.

== Education ==
There are 4 Primary Schools currently located inside Rosyth as well as a Fife College Campus inside the Dockyard area of Rosyth.

Primary Schools located inside Rosyth:

- Park Road Primary School
- King's Road Primary School
- Camdean Primary School
- St John's RC Primary School

Currently students from these schools go into Inverkeithing High School after Primary 7, but starting August 2026, students will start to go to the new Caledonia High School (Rosyth) which is currently under construction.

There is also a special education school located in the Dockyard called The Bridges Centre.

=== Caledonia High School ===
On 11 July 2024, construction for a future high school - Caledonia High School started in Caledonia Heights, Rosyth to replace the 50 year old Inverkeithing High School in the neighbouring town of Inverkeithing. It opened to students in August 2026 and is said to be able to handle 1,735 students which is more than Inverkeithing High School had enrolled in 2026. The school teaches students from Rosyth, Inverkeithing, Hillend, Dalgety Bay, North Queensferry, Aberdour, High Valleyfield, and also from Southern Dunfermline.

Residents of Rosyth are unable to take buses to school anymore causing children to be left to walk over 40 minutes in some cases as the high school is not central, leaving many parents disappointed.

== Sports ==
The town has a rugby union club, Rosyth Sharks, which play in the Caledonia Midlands Division Three league and a football club Rosyth FC that plays in the East of Scotland Football League.

== Notable people ==
- Robert Buchan, Scottish-Canadian mining engineer, businessman and philanthropist; Chancellor of Heriot-Watt University
- Gregory Burke, playwright, author of Black Watch.
- Stevie Crawford, professional footballer; former Dunfermline Athletic and Scotland striker
- John Hay Munro, author and evangelist
- Barbara Dickson, singer and actor
- Andy Penman, professional footballer; former Scotland

== See also ==
Morthouse – located in the Church of Scotland cemetery.
