= Edinburgh–Dundee line =

Railway line in Scotland

- The Forth Bridge between North Queensferry and South Queensferry

Overview
- Status: Operational
- Owner: Network Rail
- Locale: City of Edinburgh; Fife; Angus; Scotland
- Termini: Edinburgh; Dundee
- Stations: 18 (mainline); 2 (Perth branch)

Service
- Type: Heavy rail
- System: National Rail
- Operator(s): ScotRail; Caledonian Sleeper; CrossCountry; London North Eastern Railway

Technical
- Track gauge: 1,435 mm (4 ft 8 1/2 in) standard gauge
- Operating speed: 100 mph (160 km/h) maximum
Route map
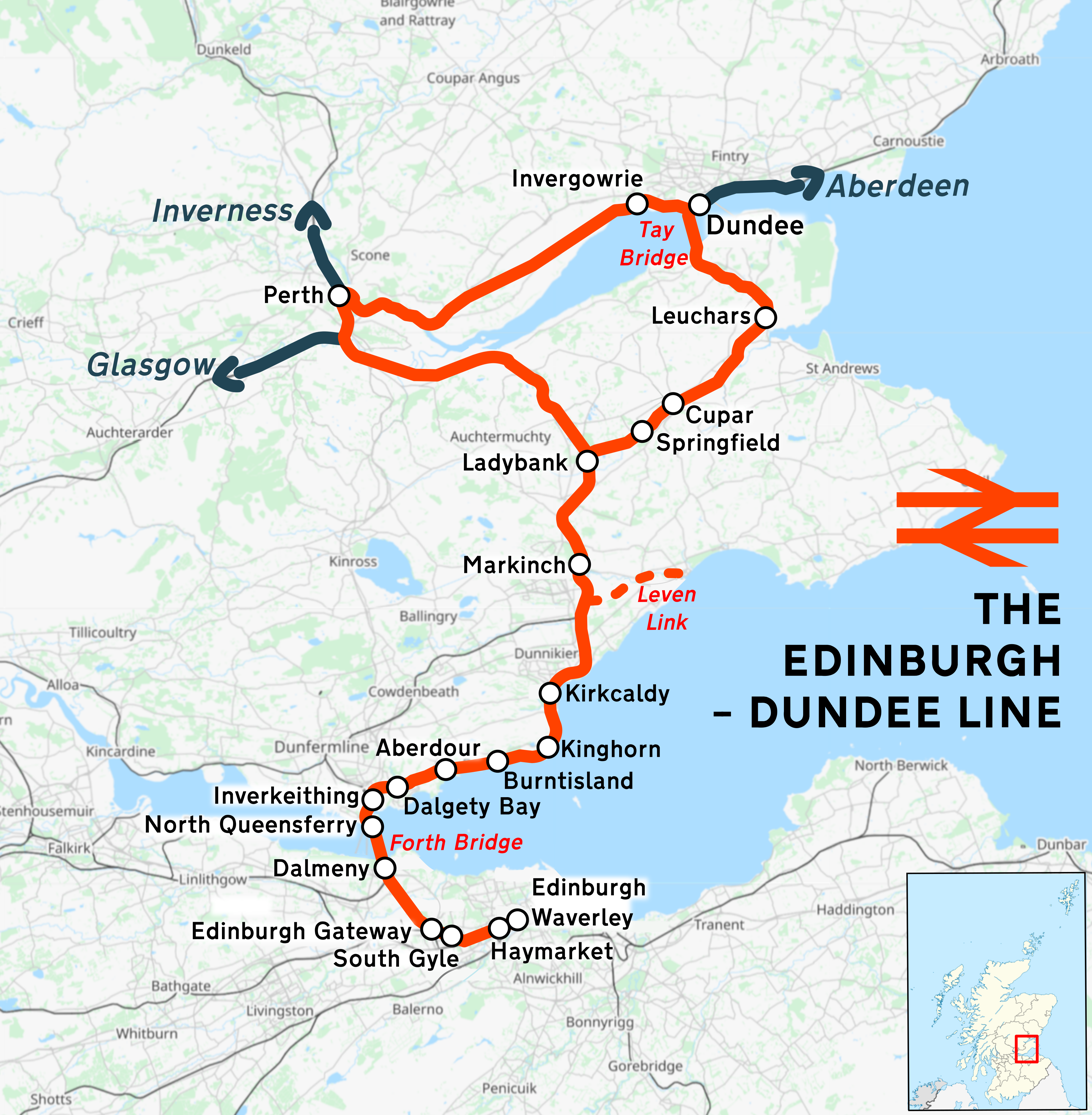
(Click to expand)

The Edinburgh–Dundee line is a railway line linking Edinburgh with Dundee via the Forth Bridge and the Tay Bridge. A branch runs to Perth. Passenger services are operated by ScotRail, Caledonian Sleeper, CrossCountry and London North Eastern Railway.

== Route ==
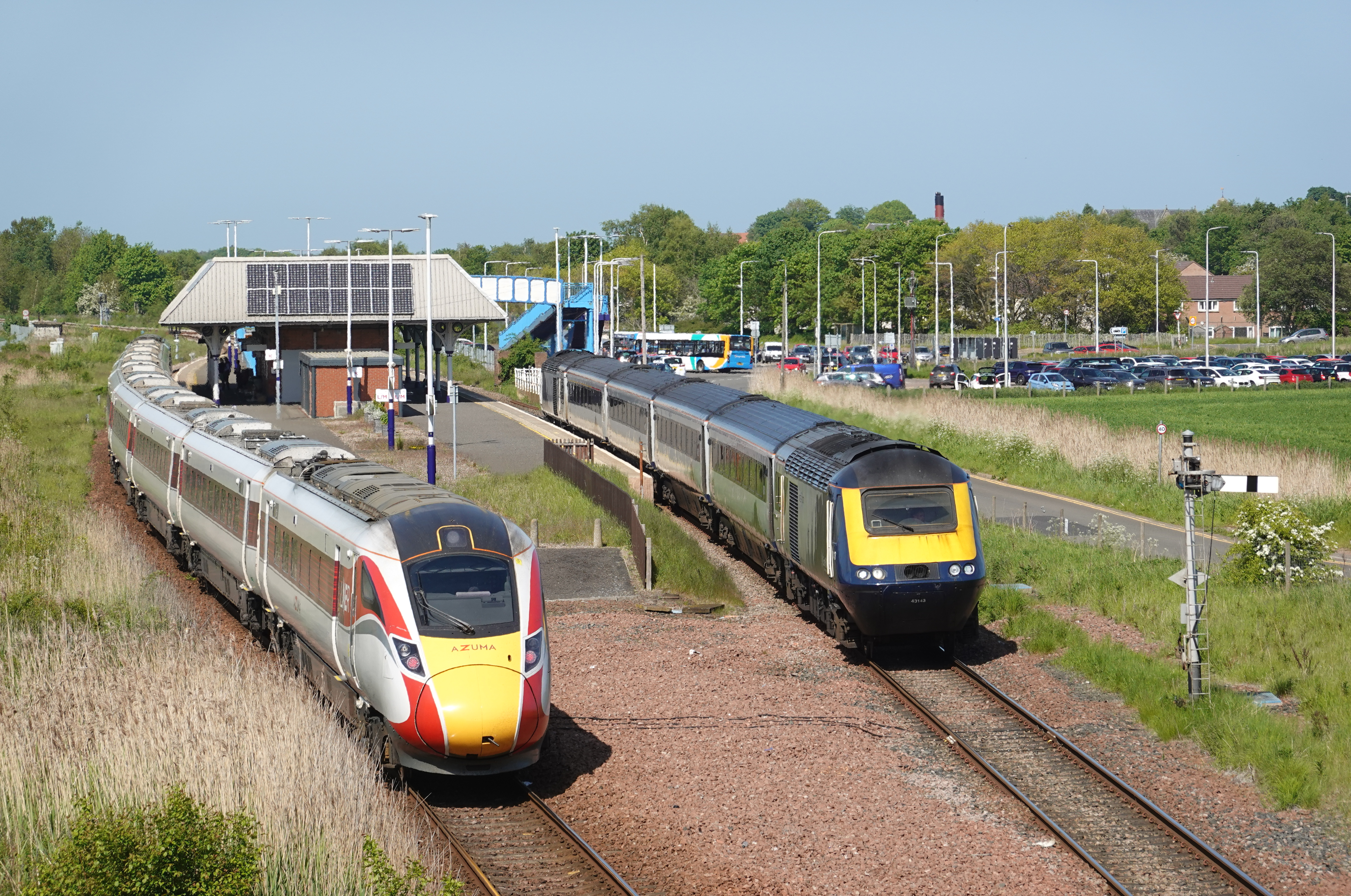
LNER Class 800 Azuma and ScotRail Class 43 HST passing each other at Leuchars

Part of the route is shared with other services:

- Fife Circle Line between Edinburgh Waverley and Markinch

The majority of the line is double track. Between the junction with the Glasgow–Edinburgh via Falkirk line and Edinburgh Waverley, the line is quadruple-tracked.

=== Historical ===
The route comprises the following historical railway lines:

- Edinburgh and Glasgow Railway between Edinburgh and Saughton Junction
- Forth Bridge Connecting Lines of the North British Railway between Saughton Junction and Dalmeny Junction
- Forth Bridge Railway between Dalmeny Junction and Inverkeithing South Junction
- Dunfermline and Queensferry Railway between Inverkeithing South Junction and Inverkeithing Central Junction
- Aberdour Line of the North British Railway between Inverkeithing Central Junction and Burntisland
- Edinburgh and Northern Railway between Burntisland and Leuchars North Junction
- Tay Bridge and associated lines of the North British Railway between Leuchars North Junction and Dundee

=== In detail ===
Place	Station	Ordnance Survey grid reference	Notes
Edinburgh	Edinburgh Waverley	NT257738	East Coast Main Line and Cross Country Route services join the Edinburgh–Aberdeen line at Waverley; See Edinburgh Waverley railway station for other lines Bus link and tram links to Edinburgh Airport
Edinburgh (Haymarket)	Haymarket	NT239731	See Haymarket station for other lines Bus link and tram links to Edinburgh Airport
Edinburgh (South Gyle)	South Gyle	NT189722	Local services only
Edinburgh (Gogar)	Edinburgh Gateway	NT176727	Tram link to Edinburgh Airport Highland Main Line and Fife Circle services only
South Queensferry (Dalmeny)	Dalmeny	NT138779	Local services only
Forth Bridge		NT135792	
North Queensferry	North Queensferry	NT131808	Local services only
Inverkeithing	Inverkeithing	NT131833	Fife Circle Line connection; Bus link to Edinburgh Airport
Dalgety Bay	Dalgety Bay	NT149840	Local services only
Aberdour	Aberdour	NT190854	Local services only
Burntisland	Burntisland	NT232856	Local services only
Kinghorn	Kinghorn	NT269868	Local services only
Kirkcaldy	Kirkcaldy	NT275916	Fife Circle Line connection
Markinch	Markinch	NO299015	Fife Circle Line connection, also serves Levenmouth and Glenrothes
Ladybank	Ladybank	NO306096	Connection for Perth
Perth	Perth	NO112230	Highland Line connection
Invergowrie	Invergowrie	N034299	Local services between Perth and Dundee
Springfield	Springfield	NO349119	limited service
Cupar	Cupar	NO376143	
Leuchars for St Andrews	Leuchars	NO449206	
Tay Bridge		NO391277	
Dundee	Dundee	NO402298	Glasgow–Aberdeen line connection.

== Electrification ==
Currently, the only electrified section is that in Edinburgh shared with the lines to Glasgow.

Work to electrify the section between Dalmeny railway station and the junction with the Glasgow lines began in June 2022 and is expected to be completed by December 2024.

== Services ==
There is an hourly service between Edinburgh and Aberdeen (17 trains in total) for most of the day. Most services are provided by ScotRail (8 of which extend to Inverurie, one continuing on from there to Inverness). 4 services are provided by LNER which provide services to/from Aberdeen of which 3 run to London King's Cross while 1 runs to Leeds. CrossCountry provides 1 train per day to Aberdeen from Plymouth while one runs from Aberdeen to Penzance and to Edinburgh. On Sundays, a limited service is provided by ScotRail who run 5 trains per day, LNER run 4 and CrossCountry run 1 service. On Monday-Saturday there is an hourly regional service from Edinburgh to Dundee, serving smaller Fife stations.
