= Dalgety Bay railway station =

Railway station in Fife, Scotland

Dalgety Bay Scottish Gaelic: Bàgh Dhealgadaidh
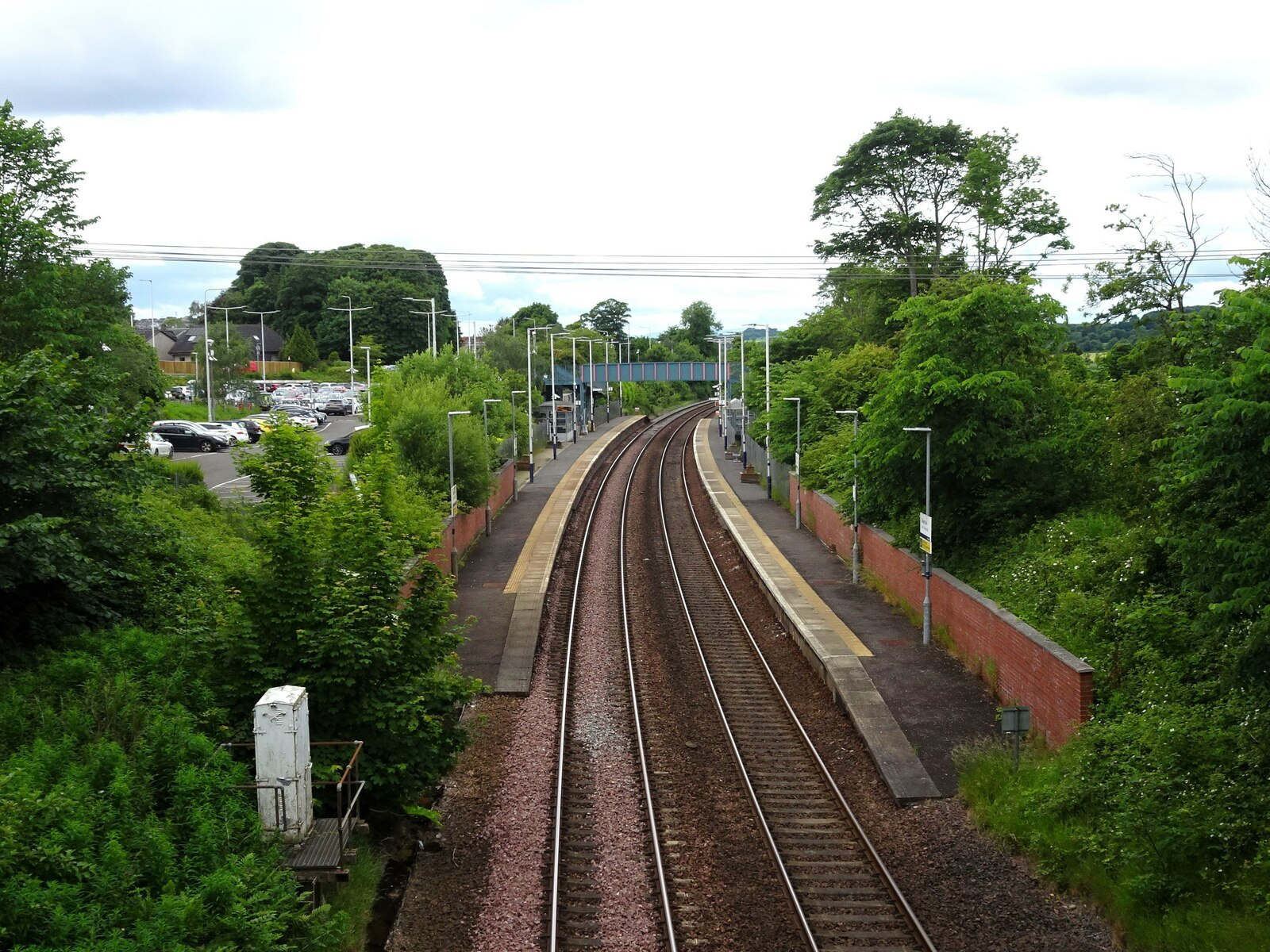

General information
- Location: Dalgety Bay, Fife; Scotland
- Coordinates: 56.0423°N 3.3672°W
- Grid reference: NT149841
- Managed by: ScotRail
- Platforms: 2

Other information
- Station code: DAG

Key dates
- 2 March 1942: Donibristle Halt opened close to Dalgety Bay
- 1959: Donibristle Halt closed
- 27 March 1998: Dalgety Bay opened

Passengers
- 2020/21: ▼26,088
- 2021/22: ▲0.105 million
- 2022/23: ▲0.143 million
- 2023/24: ▲0.197 million
- 2024/25: ▲0.230 million
Location
Notes
- Passenger statistics from the Office of Rail and Road

Dalgety Bay railway station serves the town of Dalgety Bay in Fife, Scotland. Lying on the Fife Circle and EdinburghｰDundee lines, it is managed by ScotRail. It is currently the nearest railway station to Fordell Firs Camp site, the Scottish national headquarters for The Scout Association in Scotland, part of Scouting in Scotland.

== History ==
The station is built close to the former station Donibristle Halt, opened in 1942 (closed 1959) as part of the Aberdour Line by the North British Railway, and named for the Earl of Moray's estate of Donibristle on which it stood. It is also close to the line of the former Fordell Railway, which operated from 1770 to 1946 and passed below the main line to the east of the station.

== Facilities ==
The station is unstaffed and has two platforms, connected by a footbridge which is accessible via ramps or steps. The station is equipped with shelters on both platforms, with a self-service ticket machine located in the shelter on Platform 1.

== Services ==
=== 2008 ===
Services are given in National Rail Timetable 242. There is a basic 30 minute service, with alternate trains serving Kirkcaldy and the Fife Circle route via Cowdenbeath to Edinburgh. Kirkcaldy services are periodically extended to Dundee.

=== 2016 ===
The same 30-minute base service remains, but daytime trains all now run beyond Kirkcaldy to Glenrothes with Thornton northbound. One of the two terminates there, whilst the other returns to Edinburgh via Cowdenbeath. In the evening trains run hourly and mostly run to Dundee or Perth, whilst on Sundays they run to Glenrothes and back to Edinburgh.

Preceding station	National Rail	Following station
Inverkeithing	ScotRail; Fife Circle Line / Edinburgh–Dundee line	Aberdour
	Historical railways	
Inverkeithing	Dunfermline and Queensferry Railway; North British Railway	Aberdour; Aberdour Line; North British Railway
Rosyth	Dunfermline and Queensferry Railway; North British Railway	Aberdour; Aberdour Line; North British Railway
