= Kinghorn railway station =

Railway station in Fife, Scotland

Kinghorn Scottish Gaelic: Ceann Gronn
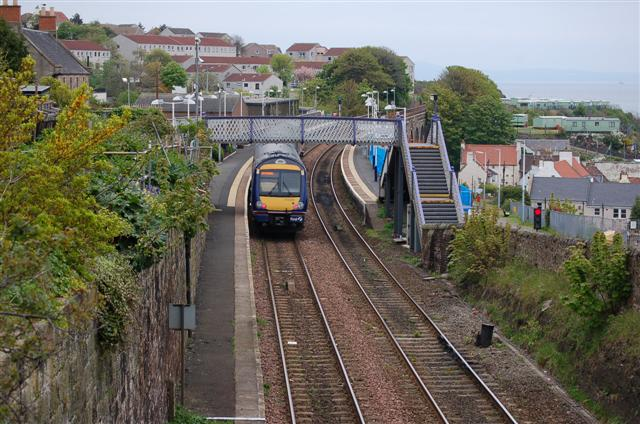

General information
- Location: Kinghorn, Fife; Scotland
- Coordinates: 56.0692°N 3.1743°W
- Grid reference: NT269868
- Managed by: ScotRail
- Platforms: 2

Other information
- Station code: KGH

History
- Original company: Edinburgh and Northern Railway
- Pre-grouping: North British Railway
- Post-grouping: LNER

Key dates
- 20 September 1847: Station opened

Passengers
- 2020/21: ▼9,342
- 2021/22: ▲50,136
- 2022/23: ▲69,616
- 2023/24: ▲88,298
- 2024/25: ▲97,662
Location
Notes
- Passenger statistics from the Office of Rail and Road

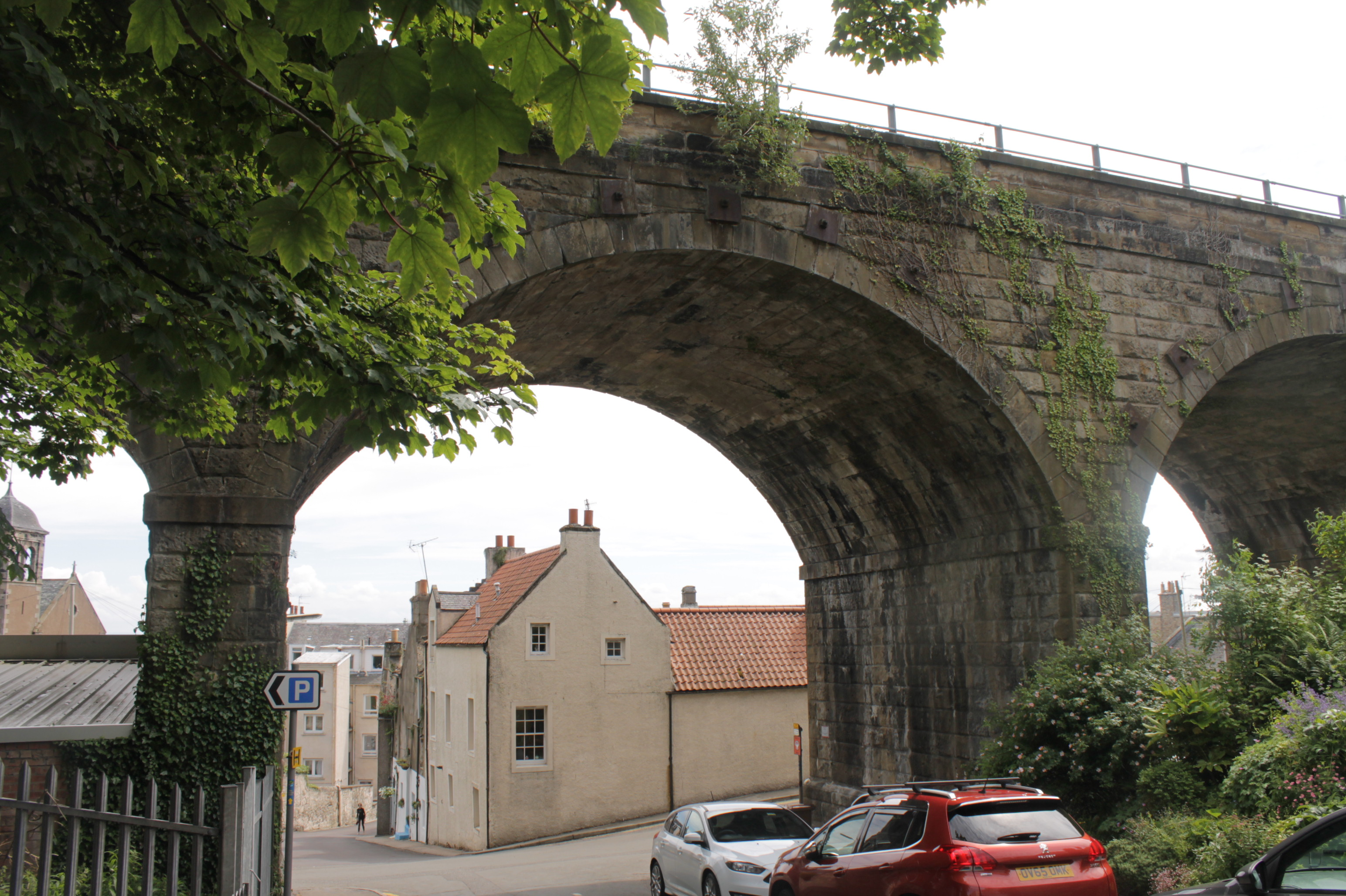
Kinghorn railway viaduct looking towards harbour

Kinghorn railway station is a railway station in the town of Kinghorn, Fife, Scotland. The station is managed by ScotRail and is on the Fife Circle Line, 22 3/4 miles (36.6 km) north east of Edinburgh Waverley.

== History ==
The station was opened on 20 September 1847 by the Edinburgh and Northern Railway when they opened the line from Burntisland to Cupar.

The 1856 Ordnance survey shows just a station here. By 1895 the station had expanded, there were two platforms either side of a double track connected by a footbridge, a goods yard to the north west able to accommodate most types of goods including live stock and was equipped with a ¾ ton crane.

Two camping coaches were positioned here by the Scottish Region in 1964.

The railway viaduct (solid other than four tall arches) splits the old town of Kinghorn in half.

== Services ==
Monday to Saturdays daytimes there is a half-hourly service southbound to Edinburgh and northbound to Glenrothes with Thornton. One of the latter then returns to Edinburgh via Cardenden whilst the other terminates at Glenrothes and returns via the coast.

In the evenings there is an hourly service southbound to Edinburgh and hourly northbound to Kirkcaldy and then Markinch and Dundee or Perth. Sundays see an hourly service each way via the Fire Circle.

| Preceding station | National Rail | Following station |
|---|---|---|
| Burntisland | ScotRail; Fife Circle Line | Kirkcaldy |
| | Historical railways | |
| Kirkcaldy; Line and station open | North British Railway; Edinburgh and Northern Railway | Burntisland; Line and station open |
