= Burntisland railway station =

Railway station in Fife, Scotland

Burntisland Scottish Gaelic: An t-Eilean Loisgte
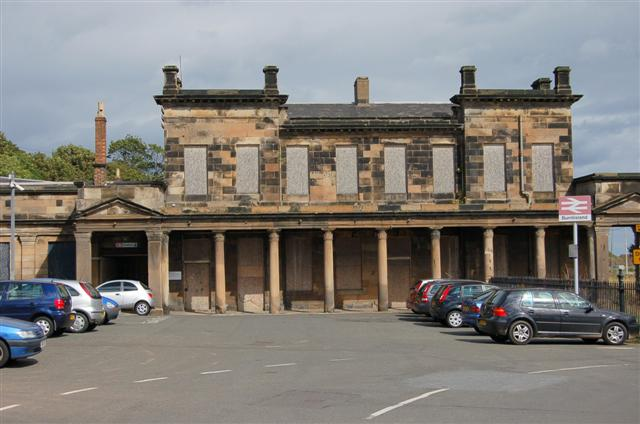
- Burntisland original terminus building

General information
- Location: Burntisland, Fife; Scotland
- Coordinates: 56.0573°N 3.2335°W
- Grid reference: NT232856
- Manager: ScotRail
- Platforms: 2

Other information
- Station code: BTS

Passengers
- 2020/21: ▼26,548
- 2021/22: ▲0.133 million
- 2022/23: ▲0.151 million
- 2023/24: ▲0.181 million
- 2024/25: ▲0.206 million
Location
Notes
- Passenger statistics from the Office of Rail and Road

Burntisland railway station is a railway station in the town of Burntisland, Fife, Scotland. The station is managed by ScotRail and is on the Fife Circle Line.

== History ==
The station was designed by Grainger & Miller engineers. Originally it was the southern terminus of the Edinburgh and Northern Railway, with tracks and trainshed stretching away behind the imposing terminus building. The railway opened its main line north across Fife to Lindores & Cupar (branch line) in September 1847. These were extended by the following summer to Hilton Junction, near Perth, and Tayport. From Burntisland, a ferry service ran across the River Forth to Granton in the northern suburbs of Edinburgh, from where trains could be taken to various destinations across central and south-west Scotland.

The current station, which bypasses the site of the original station, dates from 1890 when the Forth Rail Bridge and associated connecting lines were opened to provide a direct route across the Forth estuary to Edinburgh Waverley.

== Accidents and incidents ==
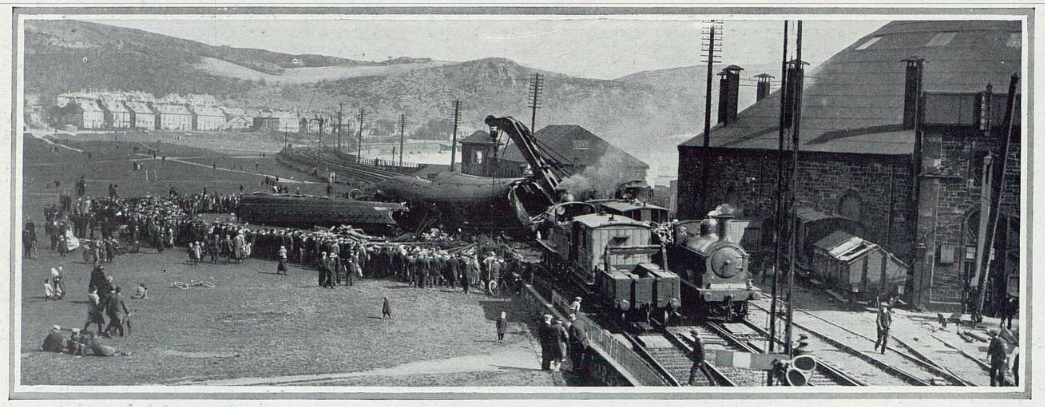
The accident to the Flying Scotsman in 1914

On 14 April 1914, an express passenger train hauled by NBR H class locomotive 872 Auld Reekie was in collision with a freight train that was being shunted. The cause of the accident was an error by the signalman. Two people were killed.

== Services ==
Three trains per hour call at the station off peak (Mon-Sat), running southbound to Inverkeithing and Edinburgh and northbound to Kirkcaldy & Glenrothes with Thornton. One of the latter then continues along the western side of the Fife Circle line back to Edinburgh via Cowdenbeath. Evenings see a half hourly service, with some through trains beyond Kirkcaldy to Dundee or Perth, whilst on Sundays the first northbound diagram of the day is a semi-fast service to Aberdeen, with an hourly service each way around the Circle thereafter.

Preceding station	National Rail	Following station
Aberdour	ScotRail; Fife Circle Line	Kinghorn
