= Aberdour railway station =

Railway station in Fife, Scotland

Aberdour Scottish Gaelic: Obar Dobhair
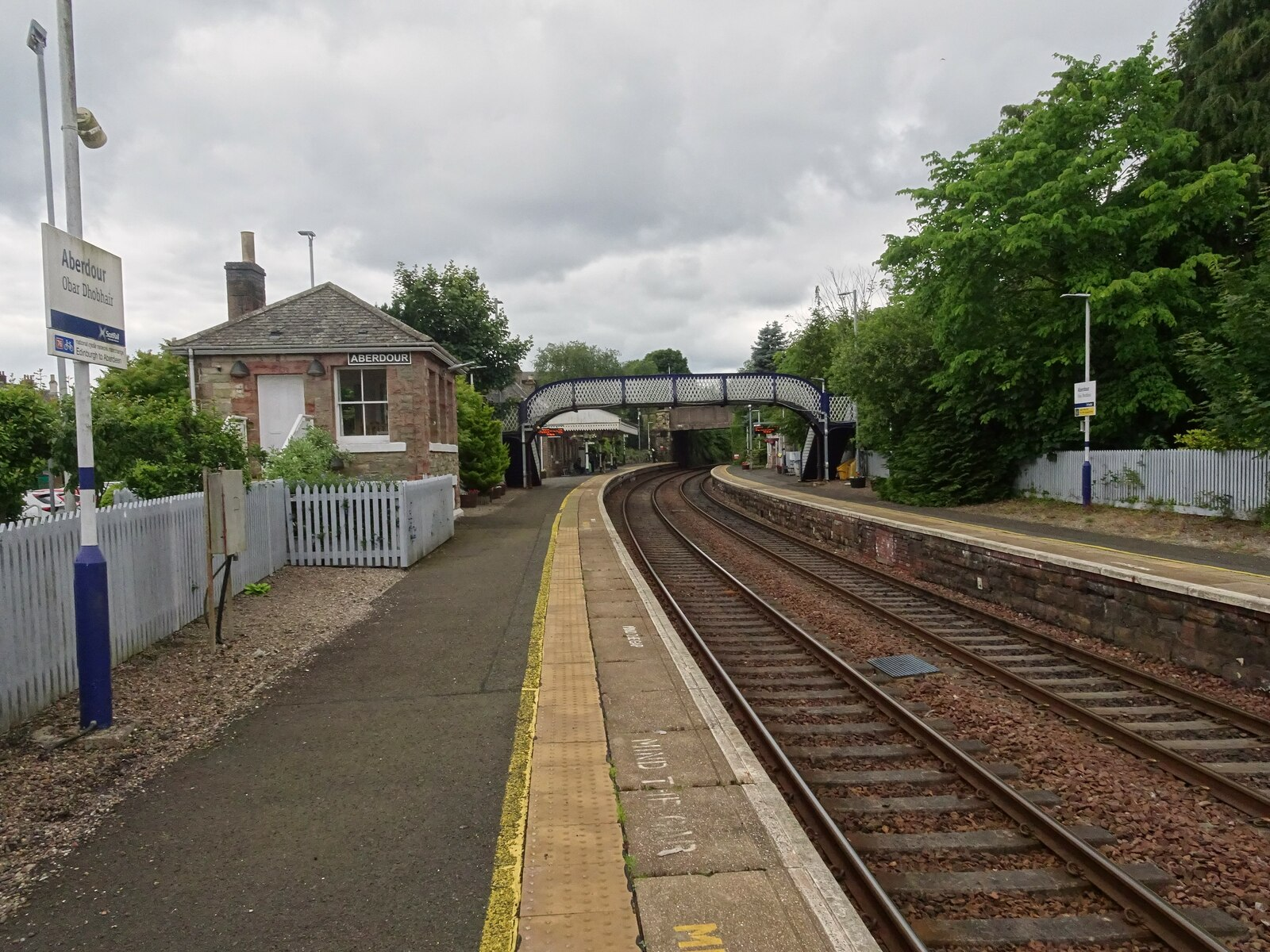
- Aberdour station

General information
- Location: Aberdour, Fife; Scotland
- Coordinates: 56.0549°N 3.3005°W
- Grid reference: NT190854
- Manager: ScotRail
- Platforms: 2

Other information
- Station code: AUR

Key dates
- 2 June 1890: Station opens

Passengers
- 2020/21: ▼14,726
- 2021/22: ▲62,990
- 2022/23: ▲78,952
- 2023/24: ▲0.105 million
- 2024/25: ▲0.117 million

Listed Building – Category B
- Designated: 12 July 1985
- Reference no.: LB3629
Location
Notes
- Passenger statistics from the Office of Rail and Road

Aberdour railway station is a railway station in the village of Aberdour, Fife, Scotland. The station is managed by ScotRail and is on the Fife Circle Line.

== History ==
Opened by the North British Railway in 1890 (as part of the approach routes linking the Edinburgh and Northern Railway to the new Forth Rail Bridge), it became part of the London and North Eastern Railway during the Grouping of 1923. The line then passed on to the Scottish Region of British Railways on nationalisation in 1948. When Sectorisation was introduced by British Rail, the station was served by the ScotRail sector until the Privatisation of British Railways. The station has won numerous awards for its gardens.

The station was the location of a camping coach in 1957.

In 2018, the station won an award at the National Rail Awards for being the best small station in the United Kingdom.

== Passenger volume ==
Passenger Volume at Aberdour
	2020-21	2021-22	2022-23	2023-24
Entries and exits	14,726	62,990	78,952	105,028

== Services ==
Aberdour is served by two trains per hour (weekday daytimes) which serve all stations between Edinburgh Waverley and Kirkcaldy. Both continue to Glenrothes with Thornton, where one terminates & returns to Edinburgh whilst the other continues around the Fife Circle Line returning to Edinburgh via Dunfermline. In the evening, the frequency drops to hourly, with most trains continuing to Dundee (though one runs to Perth instead). Sunday trains are also hourly, running round the Fife Circle.

Preceding station	National Rail	Following station
Dalgety Bay	ScotRail; Fife Circle Line	Burntisland
