= Rosyth railway station =

Railway station in Fife, Scotland

Rosyth Scottish Gaelic: Ros Fhìobh
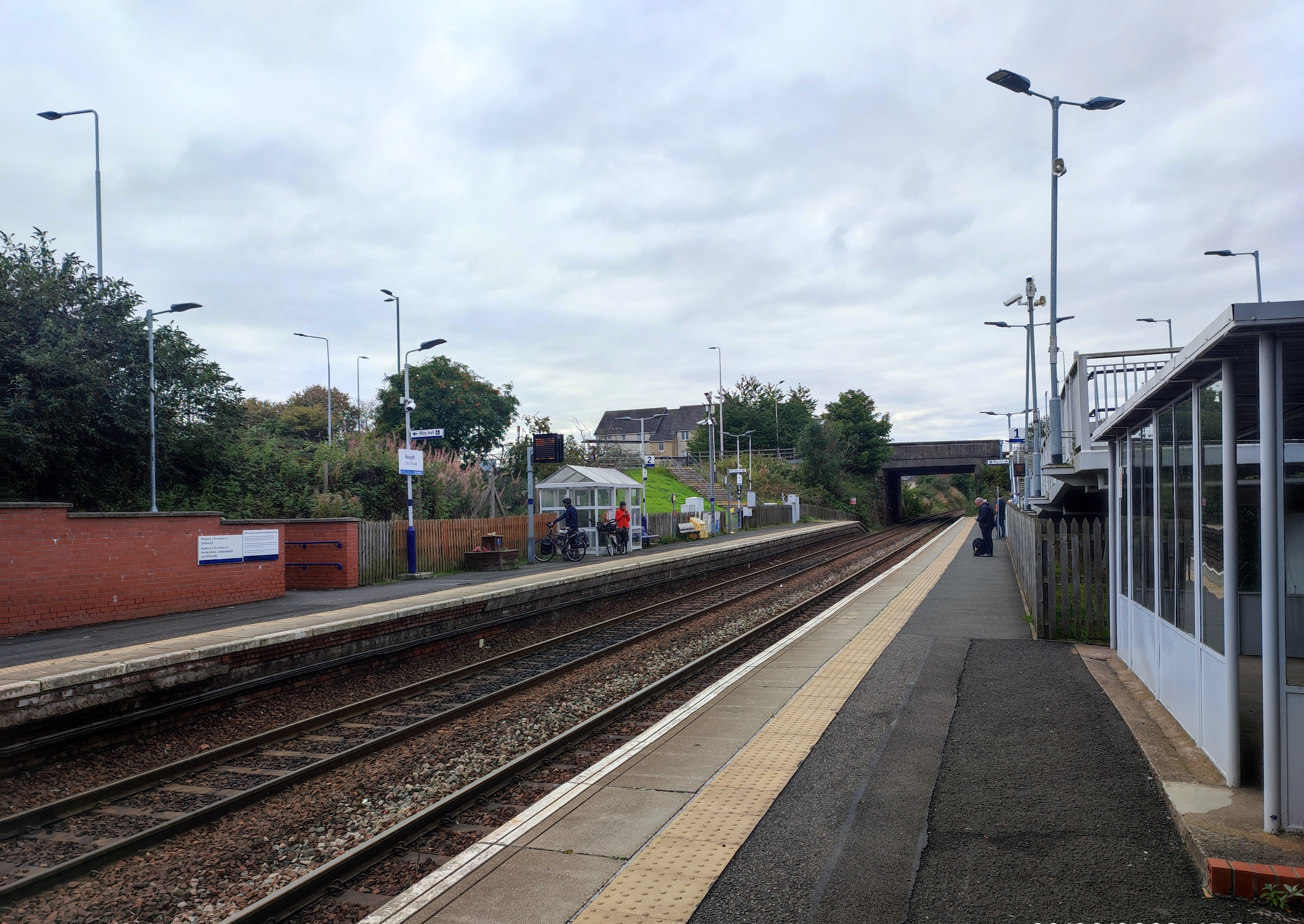

General information
- Location: Rosyth, Fife; Scotland
- Coordinates: 56.0455°N 3.4269°W
- Grid reference: NT112845
- Managed by: ScotRail
- Platforms: 2

Other information
- Station code: ROS

History
- Opened: 1 December 1917

Passengers
- 2020/21: ▼24,844
- 2021/22: ▲94,434
- 2022/23: ▲0.127 million
- 2023/24: ▲0.177 million
- 2024/25: ▲0.198 million
Location
Notes
- Passenger statistics from the Office of Rail and Road

Rosyth railway station serves the town of Rosyth in Fife, Scotland. The station is managed by ScotRail and lies on the Fife Circle Line, 14.7 miles (23.6 km) north of Edinburgh Waverley. It was opened in 1917 by the North British Railway (as Rosyth Halt) to serve the nearby naval dockyard.

== Services ==
=== 2011 ===
On Mondays to Saturdays during the daytime, there is generally a half-hourly service southbound to Edinburgh Waverley, and a half-hourly service northbound towards the centre of Dunfermline, continuing round the Fife Circle through Kirkcaldy, eventually coming back to Edinburgh Waverley. In the evenings the service is hourly in each direction and on Sundays two-hourly.

=== 2025 ===
The basic service remains unchanged on weekdays and Saturdays (half-hourly to Edinburgh and Cowdenbeath, with hourly extensions now to Leven), but there is now an hourly service each way on Sundays. Services to Leven began at the spring 2025 timetable change.

=== 2026 ===
The Sunday service is extended to Leven instead of terminating at Glenrothes with Thornton and continues to operate hourly.

Preceding station	National Rail	Following station
Inverkeithing	ScotRail; Fife Circle Line	Dunfermline City

== Upgrade ==
In 2013 construction began at Rosyth station to build new disabled access points, so that people with wheelchairs and buggies can make their way onto the platform. There are also plans for a new transport hub to be built at Rosyth, with 500 car park spaces, a bus station, and a taxi rank.
