= Lochgelly railway station =

Railway station in Lochgelly, Fife, Scotland

Lochgelly Scottish Gaelic: Loch Geallaidh
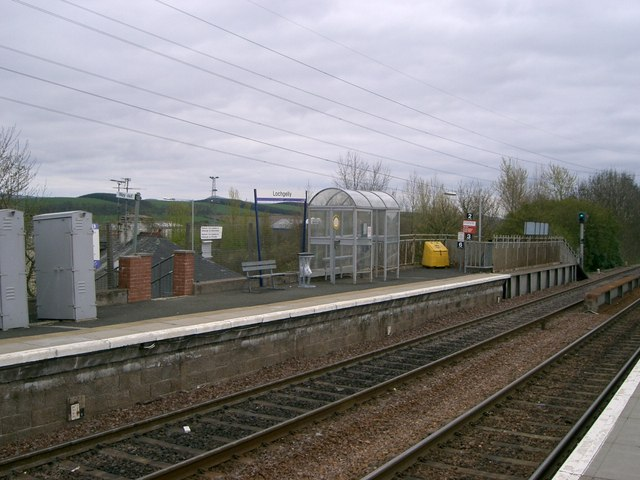

General information
- Location: Lochgelly, Fife; Scotland
- Coordinates: 56.1349°N 3.3135°W
- Grid reference: NT185943
- Manager: ScotRail
- Platforms: 2

Other information
- Station code: LCG

Passengers
- 2021/22: ▲36,380
- 2022/23: ▲41,176
- 2023/24: ▲51,462
- 2024/25: ▲57,418
- 2025/26: ▲62,490
Location
Notes
- Passenger statistics from the Office of Rail and Road

Lochgelly railway station is a railway station in Lochgelly, Scotland. The station is managed by ScotRail and is on the Fife Circle Line, 25 miles (40 km) north of Edinburgh Waverley.

Lochgelly station is on the end of the town towards Ballingry.

The station can be accessed via a ramp from the small car park up to the Edinburgh platform. To access the north bound platform, passengers must cross the road from the car park and climb a flight of stairs.

This station is unstaffed and has no ticket vending facilities. Passengers boarding here must buy their tickets from staff on the train.

There is a public phone in the waiting shelter on the Kirkcaldy platform. There are regular bus services to the town centre.

== Services ==
There is generally an hourly service in each direction along the Fife Circle Line westbound towards Dunfermline City or eastbound towards Leven. Trains were extended beyond Glenrothes with Thornton to Cameron Bridge and Leven with the introduction of the spring 2025 timetable. Some weekday peak trains start or finish at Glenrothes, whilst there is one evening train to Perth (and two from there in the early morning).

On Sundays, there is also an hourly service in each direction (eastbound to Leven or westbound to Edinburgh via Dunfermline City), plus the one evening service to Perth. The Sunday service was extended to Leven in the May 2026 timetable

Preceding station	National Rail	Following station
Cowdenbeath	ScotRail; Fife Circle Line	Cardenden
