= Cardenden =

Town in Fife, Scotland

Coordinates: 56.133°N 3.250°W

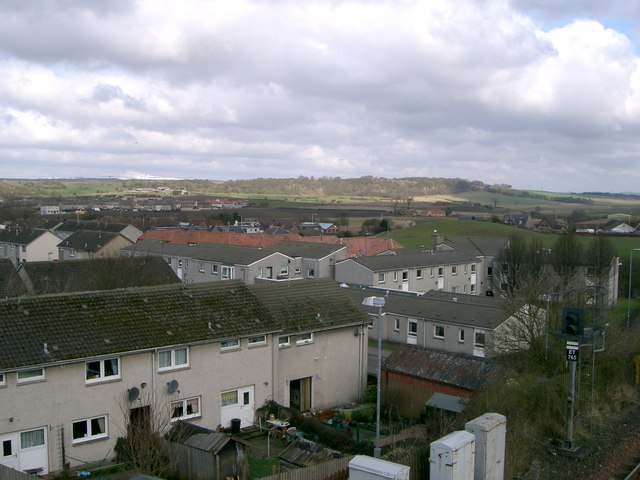
- Houses in Cardenden

- Location within Fife
- Population: 5,190 (2020)
- OS grid reference: NT2295
- Council area: Fife
- Lieutenancy area: Fife
- Country: Scotland
- Sovereign state: United Kingdom
- Post town: LOCHGELLY
- Postcode district: KY5
- Dialling code: 01592
- Police: Scotland
- Fire: Scottish
- Ambulance: Scottish
- UK Parliament: Glenrothes and Mid Fife
- Scottish Parliament: Cowdenbeath

Cardenden (card-un-DEN; /ˌkɑːrdənˈdɛn/) is a Scottish town located on the south bank of the River Ore in the parish of Auchterderran, Fife. It is approximately four miles (six kilometres) northwest of Kirkcaldy. Cardenden was named in 1848 by the Edinburgh and Northern Railway for its new railway station. A former mining town, Cardenden had a reported population of 448 in 1891 that had increased to 5,533 as of 2011.

Areas of Cardenden include Auchterderran, Bowhill, Dundonald, the Jamphlars, New Carden and Woodend.

== Last Scottish duel ==
It is reported that the last duel on Scottish soil took place in a field at Cardenbarns to the south of Cardenden. On 2 August 1826, a Kirkcaldy merchant named David Landale fought a duel with George Morgan, a Kirkcaldy banker and retired Lieutenant from the 77th Regiment of Foot. Morgan was killed by wounds received from a pistol ball. Landale was tried and subsequently cleared of his murder at Perth Sheriff Court.

The original pistols that David Landale used in the duel are housed in the Kirkcaldy Museum and Art Gallery. The duel was the subject of an episode of Timewatch on BBC television, broadcast on 9 February 2007 entitled "The Last Duel". The site is now the location of the Fife Community Off Road Motorcycle Club.

== Sport ==
Cardenden is home to the football club Dundonald Bluebell, who play in the East of Scotland League.

Also in the area is the Bowhill Leisure Centre, which has a swimming pool, sauna, steam room and gymnasium. The Auchterderran Golf Course was founded in 1904.

== Notable people ==
- Joe Corrie
- Tommy Hutchison
- Willie Johnston
- Willie Mathieson
- William McLaren
- John Thomson
- Ian Rankin

== See also ==
- Cardenden railway station
- List of famous duels
- List of places in Fife
