= ScotRail =

Train operating company in the United Kingdom

- Rèile na h-Alba

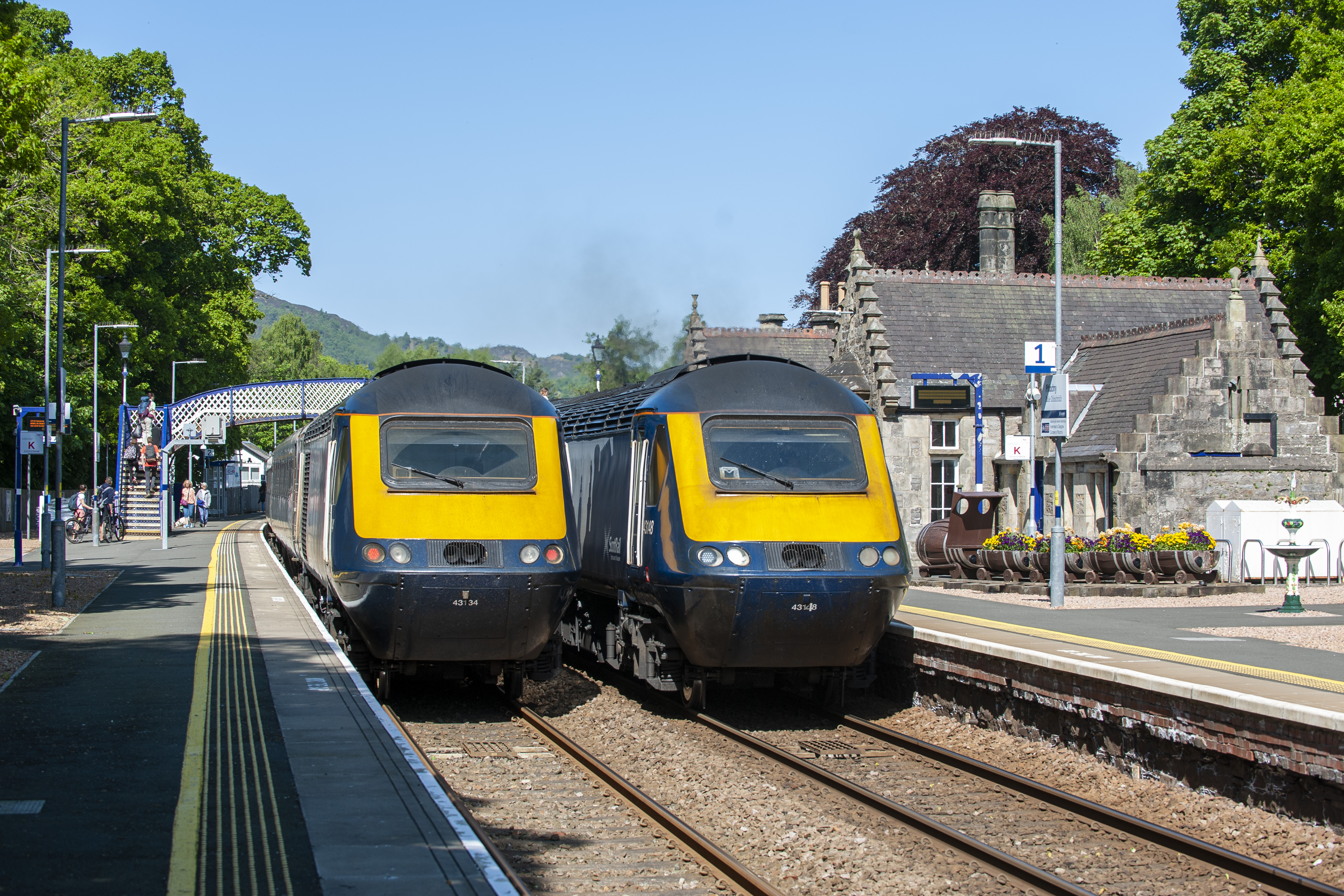
- Two ScotRail Class 43 (HST) Inter7City trains at Pitlochry

Overview
- Franchise: ScotRail
- Main region: Scotland
- Other region: North West England
- Fleet: Class 43 Inter7City; Class 153 Super Sprinter; Class 156 Super Sprinter; Class 158 Express Sprinter; Class 170 Turbostar; Class 318; Class 320; Class 334 Juniper; Class 380 Desiro; Class 385 AT200
- Parent company: Scottish Rail Holdings
- Headquarters: Glasgow
- Reporting mark: SR
- Dates of operation: 1 April 2022–present
- Predecessor: Abellio ScotRail

Other
- Website: www.scotrail.co.uk
Route map in 2014
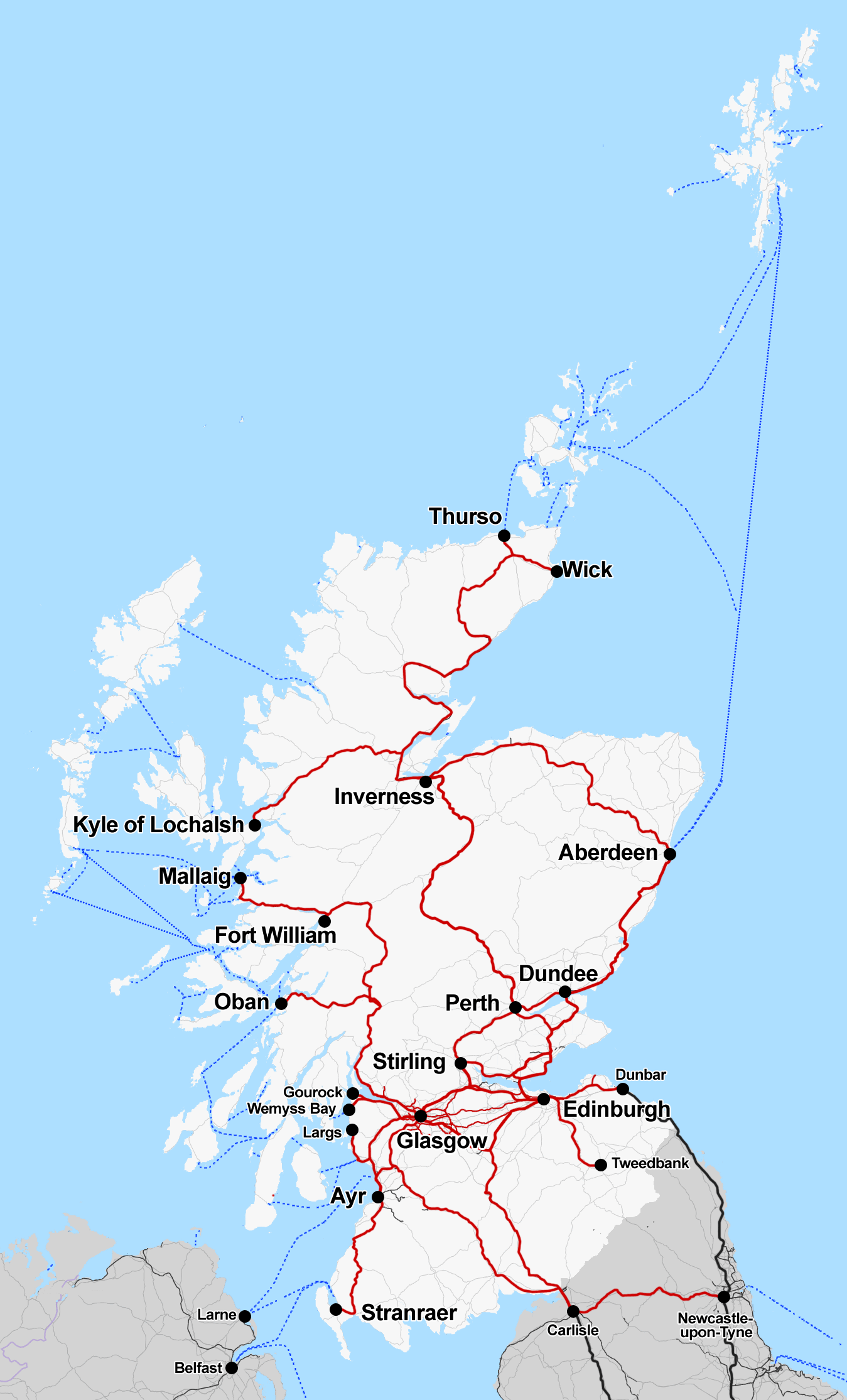

ScotRail Trains Limited, trading as ScotRail (Scottish Gaelic: Rèile na h-Alba), is a state-owned Scottish train operating company. It is a subsidiary of Scottish Rail Holdings (SRH), a Scottish Government-owned company. It has been operating the Scottish passenger railway network since 1 April 2022.

== History ==
From 2015 the ScotRail network was operated by the private-sector franchisee Abellio ScotRail. In December 2019, Transport Scotland announced Abellio had not met the performance criteria necessary to have its seven-year franchise extended for a further three years, and the franchise would conclude on 31 March 2022.

In March 2021, Transport Scotland announced that the franchise would not be re-tendered for another private-sector operator to run, but would be operated by an operator of last resort owned by the Scottish Government. The move was welcomed by the ASLEF, RMT and TSSA unions.

The then Minister for Transport, Jenny Gilruth, confirmed in February 2022 that ScotRail services would return to state ownership. She invited key stakeholders to take part in a discussion on the future of the service, saying "I can confirm that the transition of ScotRail into Scottish Government control will take place on 1 April 2022. Whilst that's good news, it's clear that much work still needs to be done... I want to kick-start a National Conversation about what our new beginning for ScotRail should look like - an affordable, sustainable, customer focused rail passenger service in Scotland in a post pandemic world."

The Scottish Conservatives Transport Spokesman, Graham Simpson, criticised the planned consultation, saying that it "should be about lower fares, restoring services and stopping cuts to ticket offices - measures that will encourage people to use public transport." The Scottish Liberal Democrats added that discussions should have started two years earlier, when nationalisation was decided.

On 4 April 2022, on-board catering started to be reintroduced on ScotRail services. It had been suspended during the COVID-19 pandemic.

In May 2022, ASLEF balloted its members for strike action, with drivers refusing to work overtime. In May 2022, many Sunday services were cancelled due to driver shortages. ScotRail stated that the COVID-19 pandemic had prevented them from training an estimated 130 drivers. On 1 June 2022, ASLEF announced that it had rejected an improved pay offer from ScotRail.

A temporary timetable was brought in on 23 May 2022. The number of daily services was cut by around one-third, from approximately 2,150 to 1,456. Many early morning and late night services were cancelled. In June 2022, ASLEF recommended its members accept a revised offer. Services between Wick and Inverness on the Far North Line were cut from four trains each way per day to two. In May 2022, Stagecoach Highlands announced the introduction of an additional weekday bus service between Inverness and Thurso, on a temporary basis, to compensate for the reduced rail service. The bus would depart Inverness at 11:50, with the return service leaving Thurso at 19:00.

=== Peak fares removal ===
Between October 2023 and September 2024, ScotRail implemented a trial on removing peak fares. It was initially due to run for six months but was extended twice. The trial increased passenger numbers by 6.8% but 10% was needed to be self-financing. From 1 September 2025, peak fares on ScotRail were permanently scrapped, saving commuters as much as 50%.

=== Minimum fare ===
In February 2026, ScotRail announced that, starting in July, a passenger who boards a train without a valid ticket would be charged a minimum fare of £10, the aim being to reduce fare evasion. As an exception, the minimum fare would not apply where there was no open ticket office or functioning ticket vending machine at the departure station. Passengers who can only pay with cash would be required to obtain a "‘promise to pay" from a vending machine and then purchase a ticket from on the train.

=== AI announcer ===
ScotRail train announcement
Fletcher Mathers recreation of the ScotRail train announcement, recorded in 2018

On 22 May 2025, ScotRail began using the artificial intelligence-generated voice "Iona" as the announcer on some services in the Ayrshire and Inverclyde area. It was claimed that the voice, made with the Hoya Corporations product ReadSpeak, used recording work done by the actress Gayanne Potter for them in 2021, which at the time she understood would just be used for accessibility and e-learning software. The AI voice replaced older pre-recorded messages recorded by Scottish actress Fletcher Mathers. Mathers said that to her the voice's intonation, which in some cases had been entered phonetically by staff, "doesn't sound quite right".

On 25 August 2025, ScotRail announced that it would be replacing the "Iona" voice, and in December they began using an AI-generated announcer based on Paisley-based ScotRail employee Vanessa Sloan. The voice was launched on Class 380 trains, with a wider rollout planned for 2026.

== Services ==
ScotRail Trains took over all of the services operated by Abellio. As of May 2025, off-peak services delivered by ScotRail Monday to Friday are as follows:

=== Central Belt ===
Argyle Line
Route	tph	Calling at
Dalmuir to Larkhall	2	Singer (westbound), Drumry (westbound), Drumchapel (westbound), Westerton (westbound), Anniesland (westbound), Clydebank (eastbound), Yoker (eastbound), Garscadden (eastbound), Scotstounhill (eastbound), Jordanhill (eastbound), Hyndland, Partick, Exhibition Centre, Anderston, Glasgow Central, Argyle Street, Bridgeton, Dalmarnock, Rutherglen, Cambuslang, Newton, Blantyre, Hamilton West, Hamilton Central, Chatelherault, Merryton
Dalmuir to Motherwell via Hamilton Central	1	Clydebank (westbound), Yoker (westbound), Garscadden (westbound), Scotstounhill (westbound), Jordanhill (westbound), Singer (eastbound), Drumry (eastbound), Drumchapel (eastbound), Westerton (eastbound), Anniesland (eastbound), Hyndland, Partick, Exhibition Centre, Anderston, Glasgow Central, Argyle Street, Bridgeton, Dalmarnock, Rutherglen, Cambuslang, Newton, Blantyre, Hamilton West, Hamilton Central, Airbles
Dalmuir to Cumbernauld via Hamilton Central	1	Clydebank (westbound), Yoker (westbound), Garscadden (westbound), Scotstounhill (westbound), Jordanhill (westbound), Singer (eastbound), Drumry (eastbound), Drumchapel (eastbound), Westerton (eastbound), Anniesland (eastbound), Hyndland, Partick, Exhibition Centre, Anderston, Glasgow Central, Argyle Street, Bridgeton, Dalmarnock, Rutherglen, Cambuslang, Newton, Blantyre, Hamilton West, Hamilton Central, Airbles, Motherwell, Whifflet, Coatbridge Central, Greenfaulds
Dalmuir to Whifflet	1	Clydebank, Yoker, Garscadden, Scotstounhill, Jordanhill, Hyndland, Partick, Exhibition Centre, Anderston, Glasgow Central, Argyle Street, Bridgeton, Dalmarnock, Rutherglen, Carmyle, Mount Vernon, Baillieston, Bargeddie, Kirkwood
Dalmuir to Motherwell via Whifflet	1	Clydebank, Yoker, Garscadden, Scotstounhill, Jordanhill, Hyndland, Partick, Exhibition Centre, Anderston, Glasgow Central, Argyle Street, Bridgeton, Dalmarnock, Rutherglen, Carmyle, Mount Vernon, Baillieston, Bargeddie, Kirkwood, Whifflet
Glasgow Central to Lanark	2	Cambuslang, Uddingston, Bellshill, Motherwell, Shieldmuir, Wishaw, Carluke
North Clyde Line
Route	tph	Calling at
Helensburgh Central to Edinburgh Waverley	2	Craigendoran, Cardross, Dalreoch, Dumbarton Central, Dumbarton East, Dalmuir, Hyndland, Partick, Charing Cross, Glasgow Queen Street, High Street, Bellgrove, Carntyne, Shettleston, Garrowhill, Easterhouse, Blairhill, Coatbridge Sunnyside, Coatdyke, Airdrie, Drumgelloch, Caldercruix, Blackridge, Armadale, Bathgate, Livingston North, Uphall, Edinburgh Park, Haymarket
Balloch to Airdrie	2	Alexandria, Renton, Dalreoch, Dumbarton Central, Dumbarton East, Bowling, Kilpatrick, Dalmuir, Singer, Drumry, Drumchapel, Westerton, Anniesland, Hyndland, Partick, Charing Cross, Glasgow Queen Street, High Street, Bellgrove, Carntyne, Shettleston, Garrowhill, Easterhouse, Blairhill, Coatbridge Sunnyside, Coatdyke
Milngavie to Springburn	2	Hillfoot, Bearsden, Westerton, Anniesland, Hyndland, Partick, Charing Cross, Glasgow Queen Street, High Street, Bellgrove, Duke Street, Alexandra Parade, Barnhill
Cumbernauld, Falkirk, and Maryhill Lines
Route	tph	Calling at
Glasgow Queen Street to Cumbernauld	1	Springburn, Robroyston, Stepps, Gartcosh, Greenfaulds
Glasgow Queen Street to Falkirk Grahamston	1	Springburn, Robroyston, Stepps, Gartcosh, Greenfaulds, Cumbernauld, Camelon
Glasgow Queen Street to Edinburgh Waverley	2	Croy, Falkirk High, Polmont, Linlithgow, Haymarket
Glasgow Queen Street to Anniesland	2	Ashfield, Possilpark & Parkhouse, Gilshochill, Summerston, Maryhill, Kelvindale
Cathcart Circle Lines
Route	tph	Calling at
Glasgow Central to Newton	1	Pollokshields East, Queens Park, Crosshill, Mount Florida, Kings Park, Croftfoot, Burnside, Kirkhill
Glasgow Central to Newton	1	Pollokshields West, Maxwell Park, Shawlands, Pollokshaws East, Langside, Kings Park, Croftfoot, Burnside, Kirkhill
Glasgow Central to Neilston	2	Pollokshields East, Queens Park, Crosshill, Mount Florida, Cathcart, Muirend, Williamwood, Whitecraigs, Patterton, Balgray,
Glasgow Central to Glasgow Central via Cathcart	1	Pollokshields East, Queens Park, Crosshill, Mount Florida, Cathcart...; Service returns to Glasgow Central via Shawlands, see below
Glasgow Central to Glasgow Central via Cathcart	1	Pollokshields West, Maxwell Park, Shawlands, Pollokshaws East, Langside, Cathcart...; Service returns to Glasgow Central via Crosshill, see above
Paisley Canal Line
Route	tph	Calling at
Glasgow Central to Paisley Canal	2	Dumbreck, Corkerhill, Mosspark, Crookston, Hawkhead
Shotts Line
Route	tph	Calling at
Glasgow Central to Edinburgh Waverley via Shotts	1	Uddingston, Bellshill, Holytown, Carfin, Cleland, Hartwood, Shotts, Fauldhouse, Breich, Addiewell, West Calder, Livingston South, Kirknewton, Curriehill, Wester Hailes, Kingsknowe, Slateford, Haymarket
Glasgow Central to Edinburgh Waverley via Shotts	1	Bellshill, Shotts, West Calder, Livingston South, Haymarket
Inverclyde Line
Route	tph	Calling at
Glasgow Central to Gourock	2	Paisley Gilmour Street, Bishopton, Port Glasgow, Bogston, Cartsdyke, Greenock Central, Greenock West, Fort Matilda
Glasgow Central to Wemyss Bay	2	Cardonald, Hillington East, Hillington West, Paisley Gilmour Street, Paisley St James, Bishopton, Langbank, Woodhall, Port Glasgow, Whinhill, Drumfrochar, Branchton, Inverkip
Ayrshire Coast Line
Route	tph	Calling at
Glasgow Central to Ayr	2	Paisley Gilmour Street, Johnstone, Kilwinning, Irvine, Barassie, Troon, Prestwick International Airport, Prestwick Town, Newton-on-Ayr
Glasgow Central to Ardrossan Harbour	1	Paisley Gilmour Street, Johnstone, Milliken Park, Howwood, Lochwinnoch, Glengarnock, Dalry, Kilwinning, Stevenston, Saltcoats, Ardrossan South Beach, Ardrossan Town
Glasgow Central to Largs	1	Paisley Gilmour Street, Johnstone, Milliken Park, Howwood, Lochwinnoch, Glengarnock, Dalry, Kilwinning, Stevenston, Saltcoats, Ardrossan South Beach, West Kilbride, Fairlie
Glasgow South Western Line
Route	tph	Calling at
Glasgow Central to East Kilbride	2	Crossmyloof, Pollokshaws West, Thornliebank, Giffnock, Clarkston, Busby, Thorntonhall (1 tph), Hairmyres
Glasgow Central to Barrhead	1	Crossmyloof, Pollokshaws West, Kennishead, Priesthill & Darnley, Nitshill
Glasgow Central to Kilmarnock	1	Crossmyloof, Pollokshaws West, Kennishead, Priesthill & Darnley, Nitshill, Barrhead, Dunlop, Stewarton, Kilmaurs
Glasgow Central to Kilmarnock	1/2	Barrhead, Dunlop, Stewarton, Kilmaurs; 1 train per day continues to Ayr (see below); 1 train per day continues to Girvan (see below)
Glasgow Central to Carlisle	1/2	Barrhead, Dunlop, Stewarton, Kilmaurs, Kilmarnock, Auchinleck, New Cumnock, Kirkconnel, Sanquhar, Dumfries, Annan, Gretna Green
Dumfries to Carlisle	1/2	Annan, Gretna Green
Kilmarnock to Ayr	7 tpd	Troon, Prestwick Town (5tpd); 2 trains per day begin at Glasgow Central (see above); 3 trains per day extend to Girvan (see below); 2 trains per day extend to Stranraer (see below)
Ayr to Girvan	1/2	Maybole
Ayr to Stranraer	1/4	Maybole, Girvan, Barrhill
Carstairs and North Berwick Lines
Route	tph	Calling at
Glasgow Central to Edinburgh Waverley via Carstairs	1/2	Motherwell, Wishaw, Carluke, Carstairs, Haymarket
Edinburgh Waverley to Dunbar	1/2	Musselburgh, Wallyford, East Linton
Edinburgh Waverley to North Berwick	1	Musselburgh, Wallyford, Prestonpans, Longniddry, Drem
Borders Railway
Route	tph	Calling at
Edinburgh Waverley to Tweedbank	2	Brunstane, Newcraighall, Shawfair, Eskbank, Newtongrange, Gorebridge, Stow, Galashiels

=== Scotland National ===
West Highland Line
Route	tpd	Calling at
Glasgow Queen Street to Oban	6	Dalmuir, Dumbarton Central, Helensburgh Upper, Garelochhead, Arrochar & Tarbet, Ardlui, Crianlarich, Tyndrum Lower, Dalmally, Loch Awe, Falls of Cruachan (5 tpd), Taynuilt, Connel Ferry; Falls of Cruachan is only served between March and October.; 3 trains per day run linked to a Mallaig portion between Glasgow and Crianlarich, see below; 1 southbound train per day stops at Singer, Maryhill and Possilpark & Parkhouse.
Glasgow Queen Street to Mallaig	3	Dalmuir, Dumbarton Central, Helensburgh Upper, Garelochhead, Arrochar & Tarbet, Ardlui, Crianlarich, Upper Tyndrum, Bridge of Orchy, Rannoch, Corrour, Tulloch, Roy Bridge, Spean Bridge, Fort William, Banavie, Corpach, Loch Eil Outward Bound, Locheilside, (Note: Request stop) Glenfinnan, Lochailort, Beasdale, Arisaig, Morar; Trains run linked to an Oban portion between Glasgow and Crianlarich, see above
Fort William to Mallaig	1	Banavie, Corpach, Loch Eil Outward Bound, Locheilside, Glenfinnan, Lochailort, Beasdale, Arisaig, Morar
Dalmally to Oban	1	Loch Awe, Taynuilt, Connel Ferry
Croy & Dunblane Lines
Route	tph	Calling at
Glasgow Queen Street to Alloa	2	Bishopbriggs, Lenzie, Croy, Larbert, Stirling
Edinburgh Waverley to Dunblane	2	Haymarket, Edinburgh Park, Linlithgow, Falkirk Grahamston, Camelon, Larbert, Stirling, Bridge of Allan
Fife Circle Line
Route	tph	Calling at
Edinburgh Waverley to Dundee	1	Haymarket, Edinburgh Gateway, Inverkeithing, Kirkcaldy, Markinch, Ladybank, Cupar, Leuchars
Edinburgh Waverley to Perth	1	Haymarket, South Gyle, Edinburgh Gateway, Inverkeithing, Dalgety Bay, Aberdour, Burntisland, Kinghorn, Kirkcaldy, Markinch, Ladybank
Edinburgh Waverley to Cowdenbeath	1	Haymarket, Edinburgh Gateway, Dalmeny, North Queensferry, Inverkeithing, Rosyth, Dunfermline City, Dunfermline Queen Margaret
Edinburgh Waverley to Leven	1	Haymarket, South Gyle, Edinburgh Gateway, Dalmeny, North Queensferry, Inverkeithing, Rosyth, Dunfermline City, Dunfermline Queen Margaret, Cowdenbeath, Lochgelly, Cardenden, Glenrothes with Thornton, Cameron Bridge
Edinburgh Waverley to Leven	1	Haymarket, South Gyle, Edinburgh Gateway, Dalmeny, North Queensferry, Inverkeithing, Dalgety Bay, Aberdour, Burntisland, Kinghorn, Kirkcaldy, Cameron Bridge
Glasgow - / Edinburgh - Aberdeen Lines
Route	tph	Calling at
Edinburgh Waverley to Aberdeen	1	Haymarket, Leuchars, Dundee, Arbroath, Montrose, Stonehaven; Some services are skipped where services are operated along this route by London North Eastern Railway instead
Glasgow Queen Street to Aberdeen	1	Stirling, Perth, Dundee, Arbroath, Montrose
Glasgow Queen Street to Dundee	1	Stirling, Bridge of Allan, Dunblane, Gleneagles, Perth, Invergowrie
Dundee to Arbroath	1	Broughty Ferry, Balmossie (limited), Monifieth, Barry Links (limited), Golf Street (limited), Carnoustie
Highland Main Line
Route	tpd	Calling at
Glasgow Queen Street to Inverness	5	Stirling, Perth, Dunkeld & Birnam, Pitlochry, Blair Atholl (2 tpd), Dalwhinnie (2 tpd), Newtonmore (1 tpd), Kingussie, Aviemore, Carrbridge (2 tpd)
Edinburgh Waverley to Inverness	5	Haymarket, Stirling, Perth, Dunkeld & Birnham, Pitlochry, Blair Atholl (3 tpd), Dalwhinnie (3 tpd), Newtonmore (3 tpd), Kingussie, Aviemore, Carrbridge (3 tpd)
Aberdeen–Inverness Line
Route	tph	Calling at
Montrose to Inverurie	1	Laurencekirk, Stonehaven, Portlethen, Aberdeen, Dyce, Kintore
Aberdeen to Inverurie	1/2	Dyce, Kintore
Aberdeen to Inverness	1/2	Dyce, Kintore, Inverurie, Insch, Huntly, Keith, Elgin, Forres, Nairn, Inverness Airport
Elgin to Inverness	1/2	Forres, Nairn, Inverness Airport
Far North & Kyle of Lochalsh Lines
Route	tpd	Calling at
Inverness to Dingwall	1	Beauly, Muir of Ord, Conon Bridge
Inverness to Invergordon	1	Beauly, Muir of Ord, Conon Bridge, Dingwall, Alness
Inverness to Tain	1	Beauly, Muir of Ord, Conon Bridge, Dingwall, Alness, Invergordon, Fearn
Inverness to Ardgay	1	Beauly, Muir of Ord, Conon Bridge, Dingwall, Alness, Invergordon, Fearn, Tain
Inverness to Wick	4	Beauly (3 tpd), Muir of Ord, Conon Bridge (3 tpd), Dingwall, Alness, Invergordon, Fearn, Tain, Ardgay, Culrain, Invershin, Lairg, Rogart, Golspie, Dunrobin Castle (3 tpd), Brora, Helmsdale, Kildonan, Kinbrace, Forsinard, Altnabreac, Scotscalder, Georgemas Junction (trains reverse), Thurso (trains reverse), Georgemas Junction; Dunrobin Castle is only served between March and October.
Inverness to Kyle of Lochalsh	4	Beauly, Muir of Ord, Conon Bridge, Dingwall, Garve, Lochluichart, Achanalt, Achnasheen, Achnashellach, Strathcarron, Attadale, Stromeferry, Duncraig, Plockton, Duirinish

== Rolling stock ==
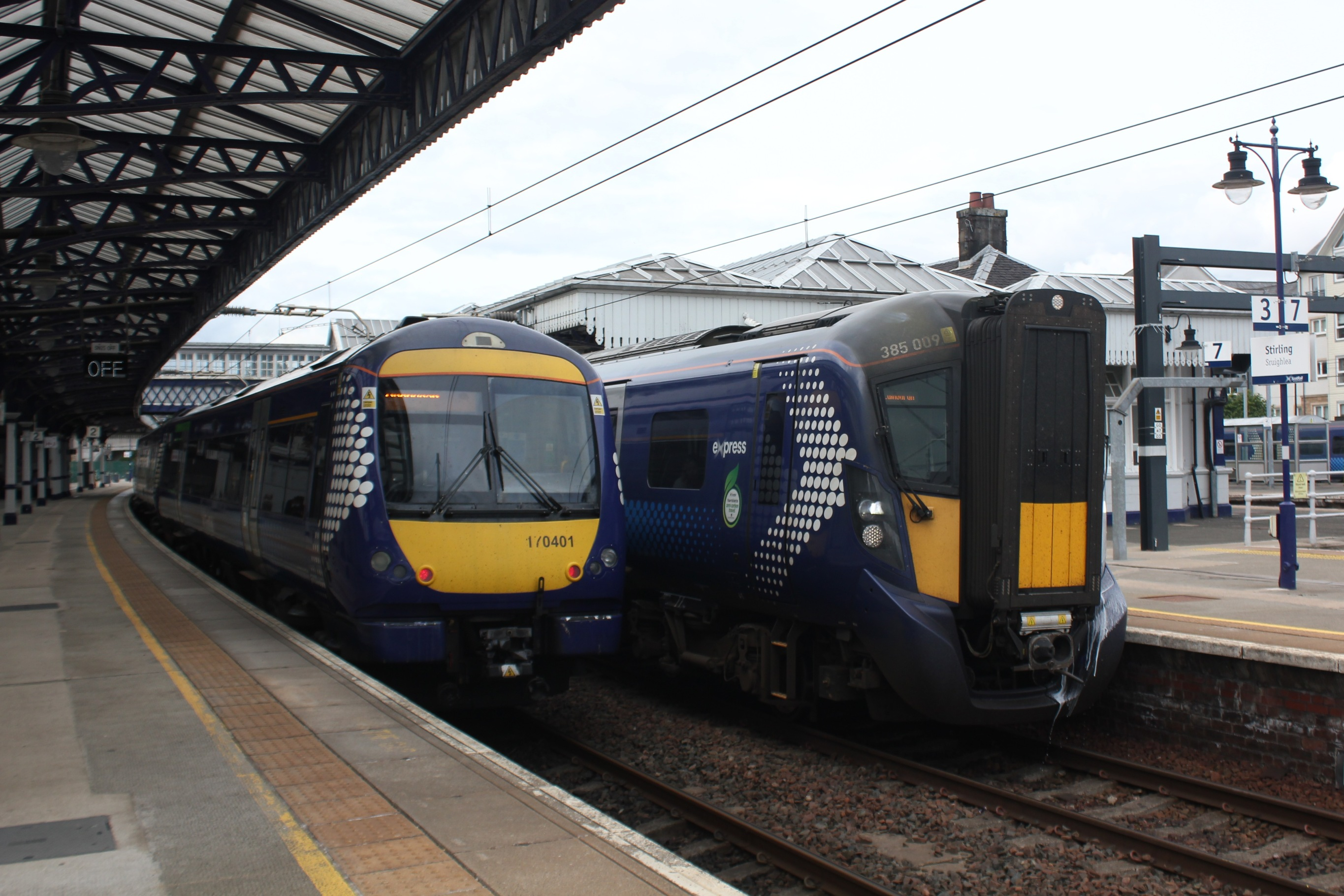
A Class 170 DMU and a Class 385 EMU at Stirling

ScotRail operates a number of different electric and diesel train types in its fleet.

In 2021, ScotRail's predecessor introduced five newly refurbished Class 153 carriages, which are attached to two-car Class 156 units. These new carriages, named "Highland Explorer" feature a 50:50 split between seating and bicycle racks. The new carriage, which carries a £10 supplement to the regular ticket price, includes complimentary refreshments, cycling-themed interior decorations and external vinyl wrap, and maps for cyclists planning to explore Western Scotland by bicycle.

ScotRail rolling stock
Family	Class	Image	Type	Top speed		Number	Carriages	Routes operated	Built	Notes
Family	Class	Image	Type	mph	km/h	Number	Carriages	Routes operated	Built	Notes
Inter7City
High Speed Train	43		Diesel locomotive	125	200	52	4/5	Aberdeen-Inverness Line; Glasgow/Edinburgh to Aberdeen; Glasgow/Edinburgh to Inverness	1975–1982	Operates under the brand Inter7City.; Fleet consists of 9 four-coach and 17 five-coach trains.; 1 four coach train damaged in the Stonehaven derailment.
High Speed Train	Mark 3		Passenger carriage	125	200	120	4/5	Aberdeen-Inverness Line; Glasgow/Edinburgh to Aberdeen; Glasgow/Edinburgh to Inverness	1975–1982	Operates under the brand Inter7City.; Fleet consists of 9 four-coach and 17 five-coach trains.; 1 four coach train damaged in the Stonehaven derailment.
Diesel multiple units
Sprinter	153 Super Sprinter		DMU	75	120	5	1	West Highland Line (Attached to 156s)	1987–1988	
Sprinter	156 Super Sprinter		DMU	75	120	42	2	Glasgow South Western Line; Maryhill Line; Shotts Line; West Highland Line	1987–1989	
Sprinter	158 Express Sprinter		DMU	90	145	40	2	Aberdeen-Inverness Line; Borders Railway; Far North Line; Fife Circle Line; Glasgow/Edinburgh to Inverness; Kyle of Lochalsh line Maryhill Line; Levenmouth rail link	1989–1992	
Bombardier Turbostar	170		DMU	100	160	34	3	Aberdeen-Inverness Line; Borders Railway; Edinburgh to Aberdeen Line; Fife Circle Line; Glasgow/Edinburgh to Inverness; Maryhill Line; Levenmouth rail link	1999–2001; 2003–05	
Electric multiple units
BR Second Generation (Mark 3)	318		EMU	90	145	21	3	North Clyde Line; Whifflet Line; Cumbernauld Line; Inverclyde Line; Paisley Canal Line; Argyle Line; Cathcart Circle Lines; Glasgow to Lanark via Motherwell	1985–1986	
BR Second Generation (Mark 3)	320/3		EMU	90	145	22	3	North Clyde Line; Whifflet Line; Cumbernauld Line; Inverclyde Line; Paisley Canal Line; Argyle Line; Cathcart Circle Lines; Glasgow to Lanark via Motherwell	1990	
BR Second Generation (Mark 3)	320/4		EMU	100	160	12	3	North Clyde Line; Whifflet Line; Cumbernauld Line; Inverclyde Line; Paisley Canal Line; Argyle Line; Cathcart Circle Lines; Glasgow to Lanark via Motherwell	1989–1990	Converted from Class 321/4
Alstom Coradia Juniper	334		EMU	90	145	40	3	North Clyde Line; Argyle Line	1999–2002	
Siemens Desiro	380/0		EMU	100	160	22	3	Ayrshire Coast Line; Paisley Canal Line; Inverclyde Line; Cathcart Circle Lines; North Berwick Line	2009–2011	
Siemens Desiro	380/1		EMU	100	160	16	4	Ayrshire Coast Line; Paisley Canal Line; Inverclyde Line; Cathcart Circle Lines; North Berwick Line	2009–2011	
Siemens Desiro	380/1		EMU	100	160	Abellio ScotRail Class 380/0 Abellio ScotRail Class 380/1				
Hitachi AT200	385/0		EMU	100	160	46	3	Glasgow to Edinburgh via Falkirk Line; Glasgow/Edinburgh to North Berwick/Dunbar; Glasgow/Edinburgh to Dunblane and Alloa; Glasgow-Cathcart Circle/Neilston/Newton; Cumbernauld Line; Glasgow to Edinburgh via Motherwell and Carstairs; Glasgow to Lanark via Motherwell; Glasgow to Edinburgh via Shotts; Inverclyde Line; Argyle Line	2015–2019	Operates under the brand eXpress.
Hitachi AT200	385/1		EMU	100	160	24	4	Glasgow to Edinburgh via Falkirk Line; Glasgow/Edinburgh to North Berwick/Dunbar; Glasgow/Edinburgh to Dunblane and Alloa; Glasgow-Cathcart Circle/Neilston/Newton; Cumbernauld Line; Glasgow to Edinburgh via Motherwell and Carstairs; Glasgow to Lanark via Motherwell; Glasgow to Edinburgh via Shotts; Inverclyde Line; Argyle Line	2015–2019	Operates under the brand eXpress.
Hitachi AT200	385/1		EMU	100	160	Abellio ScotRail Class 385/0 Abellio ScotRail Class 385/1				Operates under the brand eXpress.

=== Future ===
In 2025, ScotRail began a procurement process for a new suburban train fleet. This was in anticipation of the need to replace two thirds of ScotRail trains by 2040. The requirement was for a minimum of 69 trains with an option for a further 37 trains, these being a mixture of electrical multiple units (EMUs) and battery electrical multiple units (BEMUs). It was expected that the first trains would enter service in the early 2030s. A separate procurement process for the financing of the new fleet was begun in February 2026. In August 2026, it was announced that five manufacturers had been shortlisted for the new fleet, and would proceed to the Invitation to Negotiate stage of the process.

On 19 March 2026, ScotRail announced it would lease 22 five-car Class 222 units to replace the current Inter7City fleet. They will undergo an £80m overhaul and refurbishment programme undertaken by Alstom, with the first train scheduled to enter service in late 2027.

Family	Class	Image	Type	Top speed		Number	Carriage	Into Service	Built
Family	Class	Image	Type	mph	km/h	Number	Carriage	Into Service	Built
Bombardier Voyager	222 Meridian		DEMU	125	200	22	5	2027	2003–2005

== Electrification ==
Transport Scotland has a plan to implement the Scottish Government's policy to "decarbonise domestic passenger rail services", part of which involves replacing all diesel trains by 2035. The £55 million first phase, to electrify 104 km (65 mi) of Fife Circle track, between Haymarket and Dalmeny, for use by battery electric multiple units, was begun by Scottish Powerlines in June 2022 and was due to be completed by December 2024. However, as of April 2026, the new completion date was March 2027. Further phases will electrify the lines between Kinghorn, Thornton, Ladybank and Lochgelly.

== Stations ==
As of March 2022, ScotRail operates 355 stations in Scotland. Not included are Prestwick International Airport station, owned and operated by the airport, as well as both Edinburgh Waverley and Glasgow Central, which are managed by Network Rail. (Note: In precise terms only the high-level portion of Glasgow Central is managed by Network Rail, with ScotRail operating the low-level portion, but the distinction is not commonly noted.) ScotRail operates Lockerbie and Reston even though no ScotRail services currently call at either station.

== Depots ==
ScotRail's fleet is maintained at Edinburgh Haymarket, Glasgow Eastfield, Glasgow Shields Road, Corkerhill Glasgow, Yoker, Ayr Townhead, Bathgate, and Inverness, as well as a newly built EMU stabling depot at Millerhill in Midlothian and a rebuilt depot at Cadder Yard.

== Awards ==
In 2026 ScotRail was nominated for the Passenger Operator of the Year award in the National Rail Awards.

Preceded by Abellio ScotRail	Operator of ScotRail franchise 2022–present	Incumbent
