= Fife Circle Line =

Railway line in Eastern Scotland

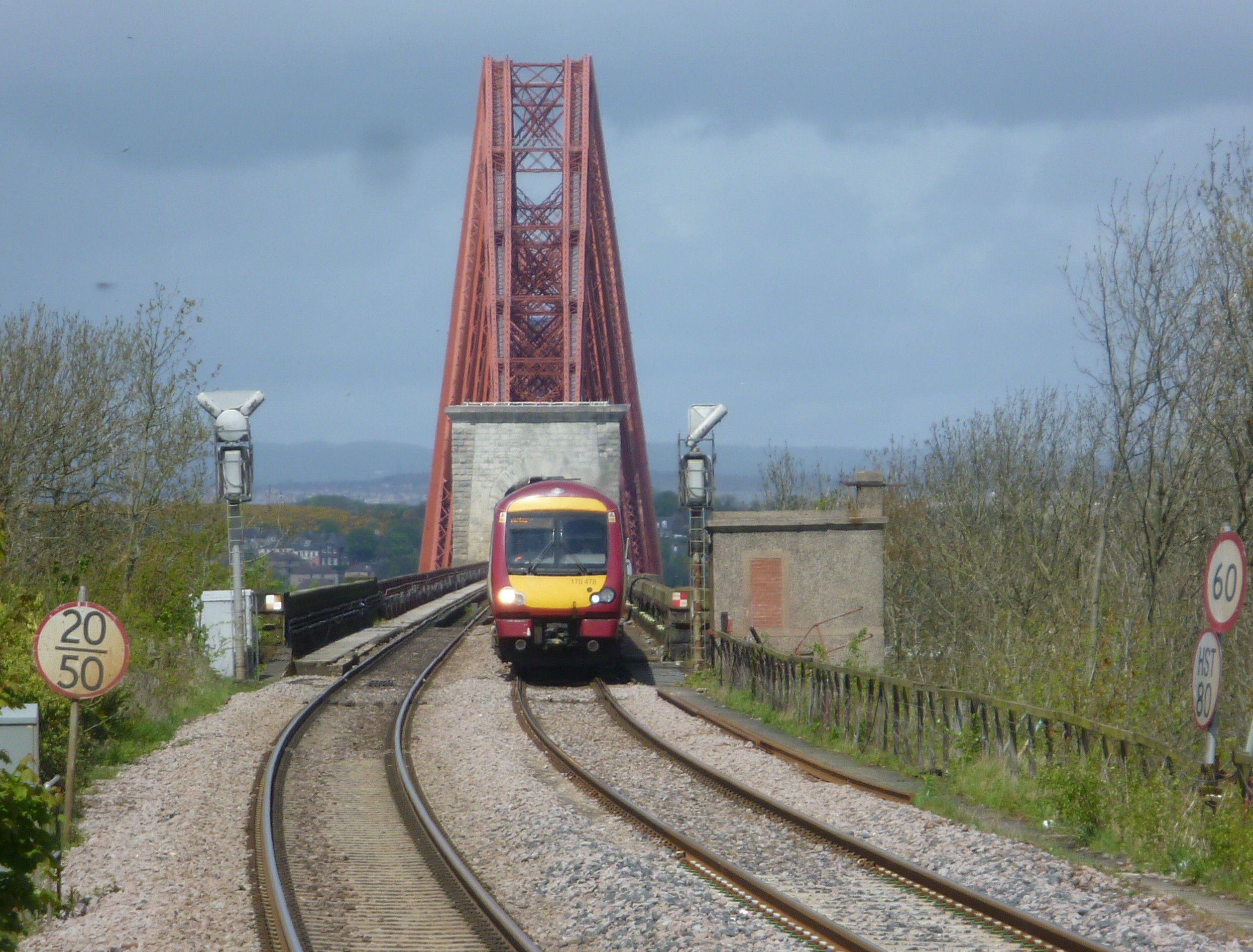
- Class 170 approaching Dalmeny from the Forth Bridge

Overview
- Native name: Cearcall Fhìobha
- Owner: Network Rail
- Locale: Edinburgh; Fife; Scotland

Service
- System: National Rail
- Operator: ScotRail
- Rolling stock: Class 158; Class 170

Technical
- Track gauge: 4 ft 8 1/2 in (1,435 mm) standard gauge
Route map
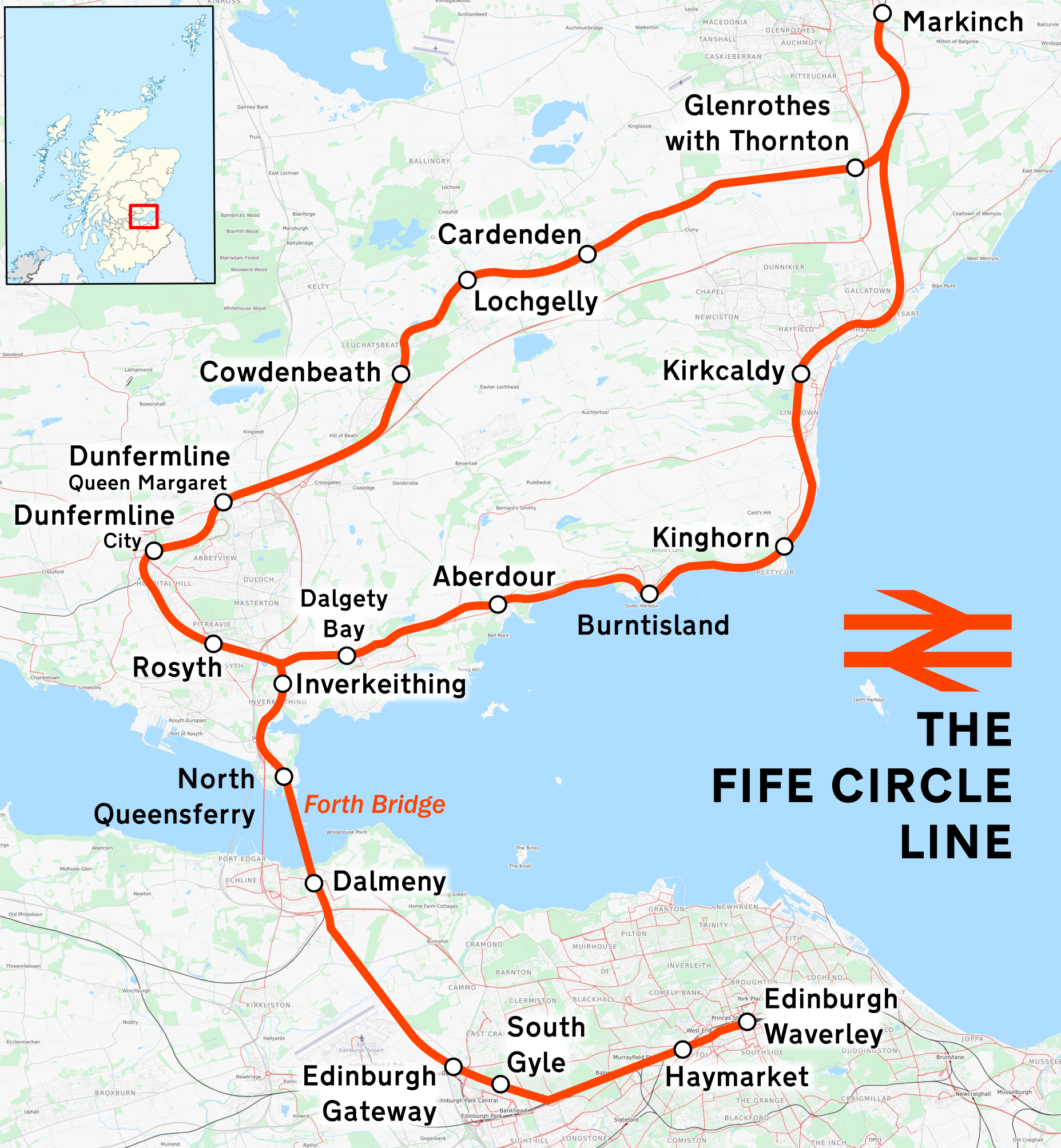

The Fife Circle Line (Scottish Gaelic: Cearcall Fhìobha) is the local rail service north from Edinburgh. It links towns of south Fife and the coastal towns along the Firth of Forth before heading to Edinburgh. Operationally, the service is not strictly a circle route, but, rather, a point to point service that reverses at the Edinburgh end, and has a large bi-directional balloon loop at the Fife end.

== Service ==
The service includes the Edinburgh-Kirkcaldy stretch of the East Coast Main Line, which includes the world-famous Forth Bridge. On the Fife side, while this main line hugs the coast, the circle is formed by a line from Inverkeithing that loops back round to Kirkcaldy by an inland route via Cowdenbeath through the old Fife coalfield. Narrowly speaking, just this line could be called the Fife Circle.

The current service is actually a combination of two previously separate local routes - Edinburgh to Kirkcaldy and Edinburgh to Cowdenbeath & Cardenden. During the 1970s and 80s British Rail only ran a regular daytime service on the Dunfermline line as far as Cowdenbeath; Lochgelly & Cardenden were only served during the weekday business peaks (as can be seen from Table 242 of the UK All Line timetable of that era), whilst the remainder of the route to Thornton Junction was freight-only (having been closed to passengers in 1969). All local stopping trains on the coast line meanwhile terminated at Kirkcaldy.

On 15 May 1989, BR decided to link the two services together by reopening the eastern end of the old Edinburgh and Northern Railway Dunfermline branch to passenger traffic, and run an 'out & back' service from Edinburgh from the start of the summer timetable, which also saw a new Sunday service being reintroduced over parts of Cardenden section, the first time since 1976. East Coast manager, Carol Johnston, said:

"The new Fife Circular opens up the new rail network in Fife and will provide many new journey oppositions for the first time."

Three years later in May 1992, a new station was opened at Glenrothes with Thornton at the northern end of the route, to serve the town of Glenrothes and restore a rail service to Thornton after an absence of 23 years. This is listed in the timetables as the northern terminal of the Fife Circle and is the point at which certain trains terminate - the rest continue back to Edinburgh along the opposite side of the 'circle'. In March 1998, Dalgety Bay opened, and in 2000, a new station was opened in the expanding eastern suburbs of Dunfermline and given the name of Dunfermline Queen Margaret, after the nearby Queen Margaret hospital. Another new station was built on the edge of Edinburgh, called Edinburgh Gateway, and was opened in December 2016 to provide connections by tram to the nearby Edinburgh Airport.

Some services regularly ran through to/from Newcraighall until 2015, but with the opening of the Borders Railway that September this routing ceased (except for a small number of weekday peak trains).

There is a goods line connection from Dunfermline to Stirling via Longannet Power Station that rail campaigners would like to reopen to passengers, as has already been done between Stirling and Alloa. The current line via Longannet and Kincardine was last used by passenger trains in 1930, though a Stirling - Alloa - Dunfermline (Upper) service ran via the Stirling and Dunfermline Railway (now closed east of Alloa) until October 1968. Coal trains that formerly crossed the Forth Bridge en route to Longannet Power Station were rerouted by that line so that the bridge's maximum signalling capacity for trains can be used to increase the local passenger service; Longannet Power Station closed in 2017 and all coal train movements ceased. The line between Alloa and Dunfermline is not currently signalled to passenger-carrying standards, however steam hauled charter services make occasional use of the line while operating on the 'Forth Circle'. The Fife Circle is a priority for present investment in new rolling stock.

After COVID in May 2022, the Fife Circle was split in preparation for the new Levenmouth rail link. Further changes took place on 2 June 2024 when the new branch opened. In May 2025 the current service pattern began after consultation.

== Service patterns ==
All services are run by ScotRail

- 1tph Edinburgh to Cowdenbeath via Dunfermline City
- 1tph Edinburgh to Leven via Cowdenbeath and Glenrothes with Thornton
- 1tph Edinburgh to Leven via Aberdour and Kirkcaldy
- 1tph Edinburgh to Perth via Aberdour and Kirkcaldy
- 1tph Edinburgh to Dundee via Kirkcaldy

=== Edinburgh to Fife ===
- Edinburgh Waverley is major station of the Scottish capital, under the castle rock and opening onto Princes Street and its gardens.
- Haymarket serves the city centre's West End and Tollcross districts.
- South Gyle is located in the South Gyle residential suburb. It also serves the South Gyle industrial estate, the Gyle Shopping Centre, and is about a kilometre from the suburb of Corstorphine.
- Edinburgh Gateway is located next to the Gogar roundabout and features an interchange with Edinburgh Trams that can be used to travel to Edinburgh Airport.
- Dalmeny is the station at the south end of the Forth Bridge. It is at the edge of South Queensferry.
- North Queensferry is the village at the north end of the Forth Bridge.
- Inverkeithing is ancient burgh and port with a history of shipbreaking.

Here the main line and loop line divide.

=== Loop line ===
- Rosyth serves the town, although it is not near the port. It also serves the south of Dunfermline.
- Dunfermline City serves the centre of Dunfermline.
- Dunfermline Queen Margaret serves Dunfermline's eastern suburbs and is near Queen Margaret hospital.
- Cowdenbeath, serves the town and the nearby village of Kelty.
- Lochgelly serves the town and the Benarty coalfield villages.
- Cardenden serves all areas of the former mining town.
- Glenrothes with Thornton, serves the village of Thornton, and the new town of Glenrothes.

=== Main line ===
- Dalgety Bay
- Aberdour
- Burntisland
- Kinghorn
- Kirkcaldy

== Future services ==
It has been proposed to start a Burntisland - Leith ferry crossing in order to spread some of the Fife-Edinburgh traffic. A previous attempt at promoting this ferry service as a commuter route in 1991 failed after 18 months. Leith itself, now Edinburgh's government district, is not served by rail but does have transport links to Waverley station via the Edinburgh tram network.

== Electrification ==
The £55 million first phase, to electrify 65 miles (104 km) of Fife Circle track, between Haymarket and Dalmeny, for use by battery electric multiple units, was begun by Scottish Powerlines in June 2022 and was due to be completed by December 2024, although as of April 2026, the new completion date was March 2027. Further phases will electrify the lines between Kinghorn, Thornton, Ladybank and Lochgelly. This will allow the Fife Circle services to be operated by battery electric multiple units whilst minimising capital expenditure on infrastructure, in particular avoiding the major expense of electrifying the Forth Bridge. Complete electrification would be possible at some future date. The partial electrification was due to be completed by December 2025 but there has been some slippage in these target dates.
