= Cowdenbeath railway station =

Railway station in Fife, Scotland

Cowdenbeath
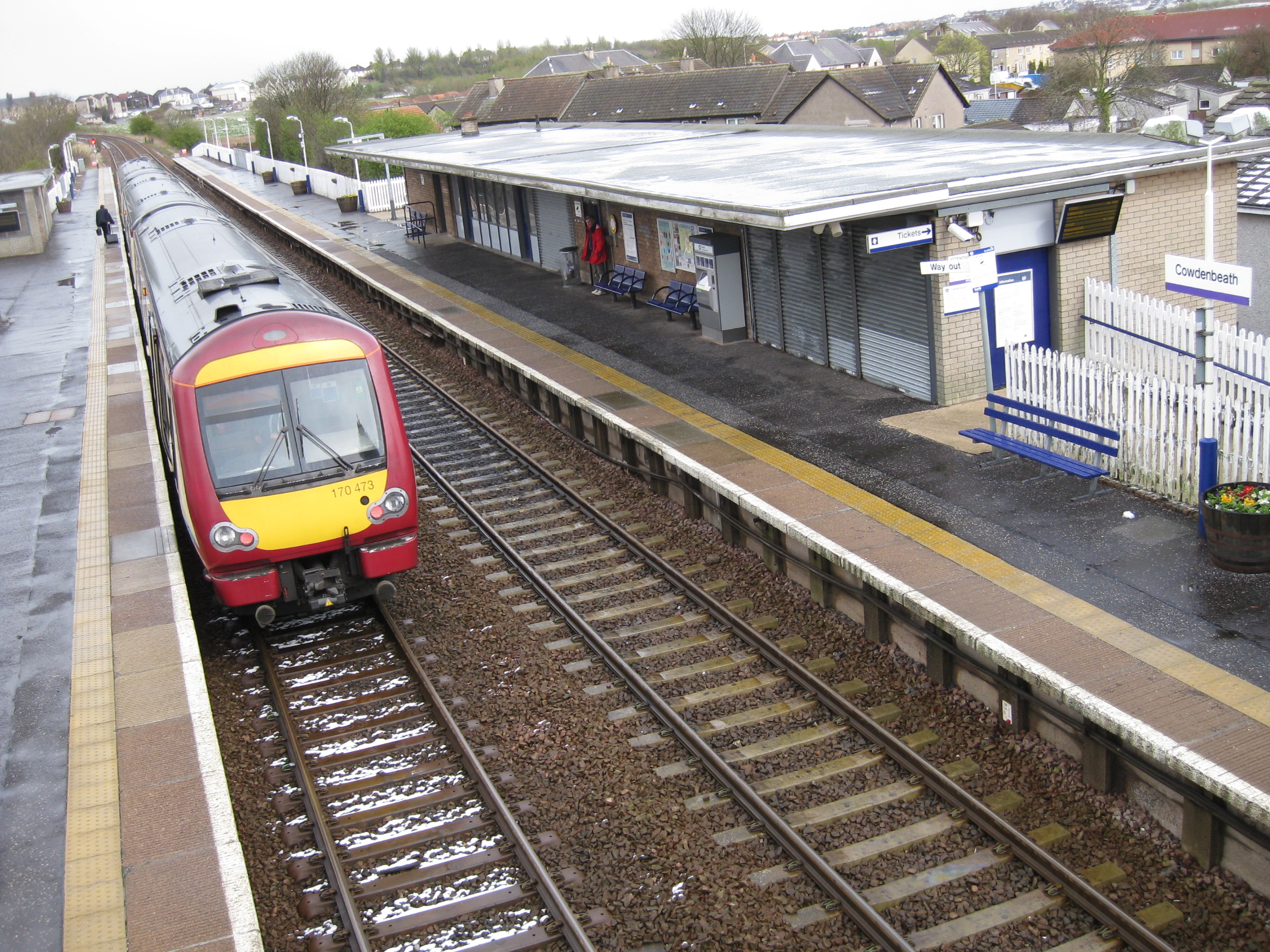
- Cowdenbeath railway station in 2012

General information
- Location: Cowdenbeath, Fife; Scotland
- Coordinates: 56.1120°N 3.3431°W
- Grid reference: NT165918
- Managed by: ScotRail
- Platforms: 2

Other information
- Station code: COW

History
- Opened: 2 June 1890

Passengers
- 2020/21: ▼17,956
- 2021/22: ▲82,690
- 2022/23: ▲94,078
- 2023/24: ▲0.119 million
- 2024/25: ▲0.122 million
Location
Notes
- Passenger statistics from the Office of Rail and Road

Cowdenbeath railway station is a railway station in the town of Cowdenbeath, Fife, Scotland. The station is managed by ScotRail and is on the Fife Circle Line, 22 1/2 miles (36.2 km) north of Edinburgh Waverley.

The station can be accessed via two steep ramps from either the east side of the High Street, or Station Road, and there is a footbridge connecting the platforms.

The ticket office is situated within the waiting room. Additional ticket facilities are provided by an automatic ticket machine outside the waiting room. There is a toilet but to access it, a key must be obtained from the ticket office. There were public toilet facilities in the High Street but these were closed in May 2008; now the nearest facilities are at Cowdenbeath Leisure Centre, a short walk from the station.

The nearest bus stops, public phones and taxi rank are in the High Street.

== History ==
The Edinburgh and Northern Railway was the first company to serve Cowdenbeath from 1848, with the Kinross-shire Railway line to Kinross opening 12 years later in 1860 (this later became part of the most direct rail route between Edinburgh and Perth). This though followed a more southerly course through the town than the present alignment, which was built & commissioned by the North British Railway in June 1890 as part of the programme of works associated with the new Forth Rail Bridge. The station here was opened on this date, with the original depot becoming Cowdenbeath Old. A connecting chord was subsequently built to link the 'New' station to the 1848 E&NR route, and from March 1919, all passenger services were routed this way. The 1848 station and line serving it was then closed to passengers, although it remained open for through goods traffic until 1966 and to serve a colliery at the western end until 1978.

The opening of the Dunfermline and Queensferry Railway in 1877 and the Glenfarg Line linking Kinross with Bridge of Earn meant that the new station was served from the outset by main line expresses between Edinburgh and Perth (some of which continued on to Inverness via the Highland Main Line) as well as local trains toward Stirling (via Alloa) & Thornton Junction along the old E&NR route via Cardenden from 1919. All the routes in the area became part of the London and North Eastern Railway at the 1923 Grouping and the Scottish Region of British Railways upon nationalisation of the railway network in January 1948.

The station was not listed for closure in the 1963 Beeching Report, but it lost many of its services in the years that followed - trains to the coast were withdrawn beyond Cardenden in October 1969, whilst the Kinross and Perth line was closed to all traffic just a few months later (on 5 January 1970) leaving only the route to Dunfermline and Edinburgh in operation. Cowdenbeath thereafter became the terminus for most trains, with only a limited number of peak period services continuing through to Cardenden. This remained the situation until the line beyond there to Thornton Junction was reopened and the Fife Circle Line service introduced in 1989. The circular service beyond Glenrothes with Thornton down the coast no longer operates - the hourly service now runs to and from Leven via Thornton Junction since the May 2025 timetable change.

== Services ==
Monday to Saturday daytimes, there is generally a half-hourly service southbound to Edinburgh and an hourly service northbound towards Glenrothes with Thornton and Leven over the newly reopened Levenmouth rail link. Roughly half of all services from Edinburgh terminate here, then return on the Edinburgh-bound track after reversing at the points located 13 chains (860 ft; 260 m) south of the station. A limited service to/from Perth serves the station also (two early morning trains southbound and one in the evening northbound).

In the evenings and on Sundays, there is an hourly service in each direction (eastbound to Leven, westbound to Edinburgh via Dunfermline). One northbound evening service runs to Perth, whilst one starts from there in the morning.

Preceding station	National Rail	Following station
Dunfermline Queen Margaret	ScotRail; Fife Circle Line	Lochgelly
Terminus	Kinross-shire Railway	Kelty; Line and station closed
