= Cardenden railway station =

Railway station in Fife, Scotland

Cardenden
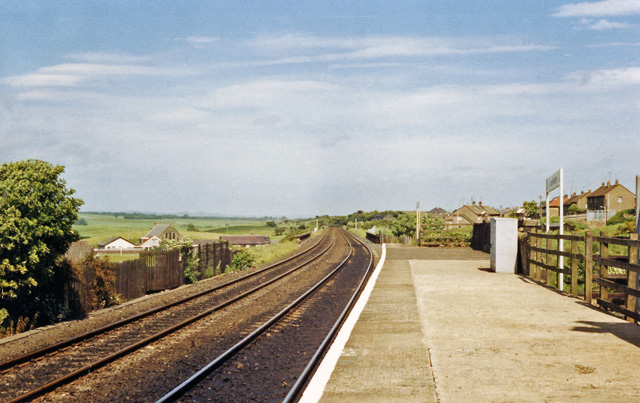
- Cardenden railway station in 1988

General information
- Location: Cardenden, Fife; Scotland
- Coordinates: 56.1411°N 3.2609°W
- Grid reference: NT217949
- Manager: ScotRail
- Platforms: 2

Other information
- Station code: CDD

History
- Opened: 1848

Passengers
- 2021/22: ▲25,118
- 2022/23: ▲31,650
- 2023/24: ▲37,974
- 2024/25: ▲43,222
- 2025/26: ▲48,188
Location
Notes
- Passenger statistics from the Office of Rail and Road

Cardenden railway station is a railway station in Cardenden, Fife, Scotland. The station is managed by ScotRail and is on the Fife Circle Line, 27 miles (43 km) north of Edinburgh Waverley. It opened to traffic in 1848, on the Dunfermline Branch of the Edinburgh and Northern Railway.

The station is situated on Station Road, between the Bowhill and Dundonald areas. It can be accessed from the street by ramps or stairs. A footbridge connects the platforms.

During 2026, a new footbridge is being installed, 30 metres to the west. This will be taller than the existing one, and will also have lifts on both platforms. The new bridge is required, as part of the Fife electrification. The stepped access to the new bridge will be ready in December 2026, when the old bridge from 1851 will be removed, and the lifts will be operational in Spring 2027.

The station is unstaffed and there are no ticket vending facilities. Passengers boarding here must buy their tickets from staff on the train.

There is a small car park. There are bus stops on Station Road.

The station has recently been upgraded with new platforms and a signage system giving accurate train times.

A CCTV system covers the station and is operated by ScotRail.

Cardenden was the terminus for train services until the line to Thornton re-opened in May 1989 allowing the "Fife Circle Line" to operate. During the 1970s and early 1980s, the station was only served during the morning & early evening peak (trains outside these times starting/terminating at Cowdenbeath).

== Services ==
There is generally an hourly service in each direction along the Fife Circle Line westbound towards Dunfermline City or eastbound towards Leven. Additional services run at weekday peak times, with one in each direction (via Cowdenbeath) starting & finishing here. There are no longer any services to Edinburgh via Kirkcaldy.

On Sundays, there is an hourly service in each direction, with a single evening service through to Markinch and Perth.

Preceding station	National Rail	Following station
Lochgelly	ScotRail; Fife Circle Line	Glenrothes with Thornton
