= Glenrothes with Thornton railway station =

Railway station in Fife, Scotland

Glenrothes with Thornton Scottish Gaelic: Gleann Rathais le Thornton
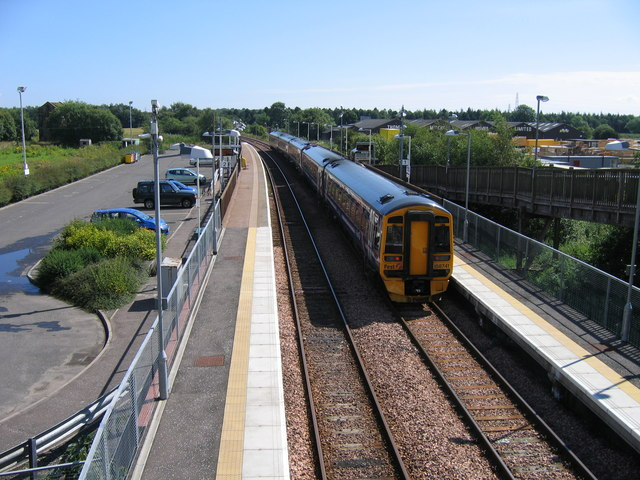

General information
- Location: Thornton, Fife; Scotland
- Coordinates: 56.1623°N 3.1426°W
- Grid reference: NT291972
- Manager: ScotRail
- Platforms: 2

Other information
- Station code: GLT

History
- Opened: 11 May 1992

Passengers
- 2021/22: ▲43,680
- 2022/23: ▼42,604
- 2023/24: ▲50,680
- 2024/25: ▲50,756
- 2025/26: ▲52,812
Location
Notes
- Passenger statistics from the Office of Rail and Road

Glenrothes with Thornton railway station (Usually referred to as Glenrothes) is located in Thornton in Fife, Scotland. It serves the communities of Thornton and Glenrothes. The station is managed by ScotRail and is on the Fife Circle Line, 31 1/4 miles (50.3 km) north of Edinburgh Waverley. Despite the name, Markinch station is closer to Glenrothes and receives a more frequent service of 2tph. The station will be renamed Thornton on 13 December 2026.

== History ==
The station is situated on the Dunfermline branch of the Edinburgh and Northern Railway, just west of its divergence from the E&NR main line via a triangular junction. It is a completely new structure, having been built by British Rail with the support of Fife Regional Council to serve the two communities that it is named after. Glenrothes (as a post-war new town) has never had its own station (though Markinch station is nearby) whilst Thornton had lost its station (Thornton Junction) on the main line in October 1969 in the aftermath of the Beeching Axe (services on the line westwards to Cardenden and on the Leven branch had ended at the same time).

The successful inauguration of the Fife Circle Line service in 1989 had seen the Cardenden to Thornton Jn section reopened to passengers, and this provided the catalyst for the construction of the station. It was completed in the spring of 1992 and it was opened to traffic on 11 May that year, at the summer timetable change.

Though it has the appearance of a standard two-platform station on a double-track line, it is actually sited east of Thornton West Junction, where the double line from Cardenden splits into two parallel single lines that diverge after passing through the station to join the main line. One of these runs southwards to Thornton South Junction and is used by all trains to and from Edinburgh via the coast, whilst the other curves to the north and is used by trains heading for Markinch and thence to Perth or Dundee. As a consequence of this, both platforms are bi-directional (a similar layout exists at Bare Lane in Lancashire), but the southern one (platform 1) was much busier than the northern one (2) due to the service pattern in use on the Fife Circle. The May 2025 timetable change saw the service from the west extended to/from Leven on weekdays and Saturdays, and this has resulted in a complete change of usage, with nearly all services using platform 2 (as trains now use the west to north curve to reach their new northern terminus). Platform 1 now only sees occasional use by terminating services from the west and peak-hour trains from/towards Kirkcaldy.

Since 2019, Thornton Community Council have been campaigning to drop "Glenrothes with" from the station name, thus naming it simply "Thornton". They argue that the station is 3.4 miles (5.5 km) from Glenrothes, and passengers unfamiliar with the area who are travelling to Glenrothes often mistakenly alight there, and are then faced with a 20-minute bus ride or a walk of over an hour. In 2025, Fife Council voted to support the campaign. In September 2026, a formal consultation was launched by Scotrail to determine support or otherwise for the change. In November 2026, ScotRail announced that the station will be renamed Thornton on 13 December.

== Services ==
As of May 2026, on Mondays to Saturdays (outwith the morning peak period), there is an hourly service to Leven and Edinburgh via Cowdenbeath. There is a limited service to Edinburgh via Kirkcaldy of 1 train per day, plus some extra services via Dunfermline City.

On Sundays, there is an hourly service to Leven and to Edinburgh via Cowdenbeath.

There is a very limited service to/from Perth. On Mondays to Saturdays, there is one train per day to Perth, while there are two trains from Perth which call here, heading to Edinburgh. On Sundays, there is also one train per day northbound, with one train from Perth to Edinburgh.

Preceding station	National Rail	Following station
Cardenden	ScotRail; Fife Circle Line	Kirkcaldy
Cardenden	ScotRail; Levenmouth rail link	Cameron Bridge
