= Cameron Bridge =

Village in Fife, Scotland

Coordinates: 56°11′22.5″N 3°03′22.1″W

Cameron Bridge is a village in the conurbation of Levenmouth in Fife, Scotland. It is near to the village of Windygates and 2 miles (3 km) west of the town of Leven. A distillery was established in the 19th century by the Haig family, which is now part of Diageo. The distillery produces Scotch whisky.

== History and locality ==
It is a settlement at a bridge over the River Leven, which replaced a ford there. When Leven was flooded it was the first upstream crossing. In 1870, an earlier bridge was replaced with a new one. The River Ore joins the Leven a little upstream of the village.

== Transport ==
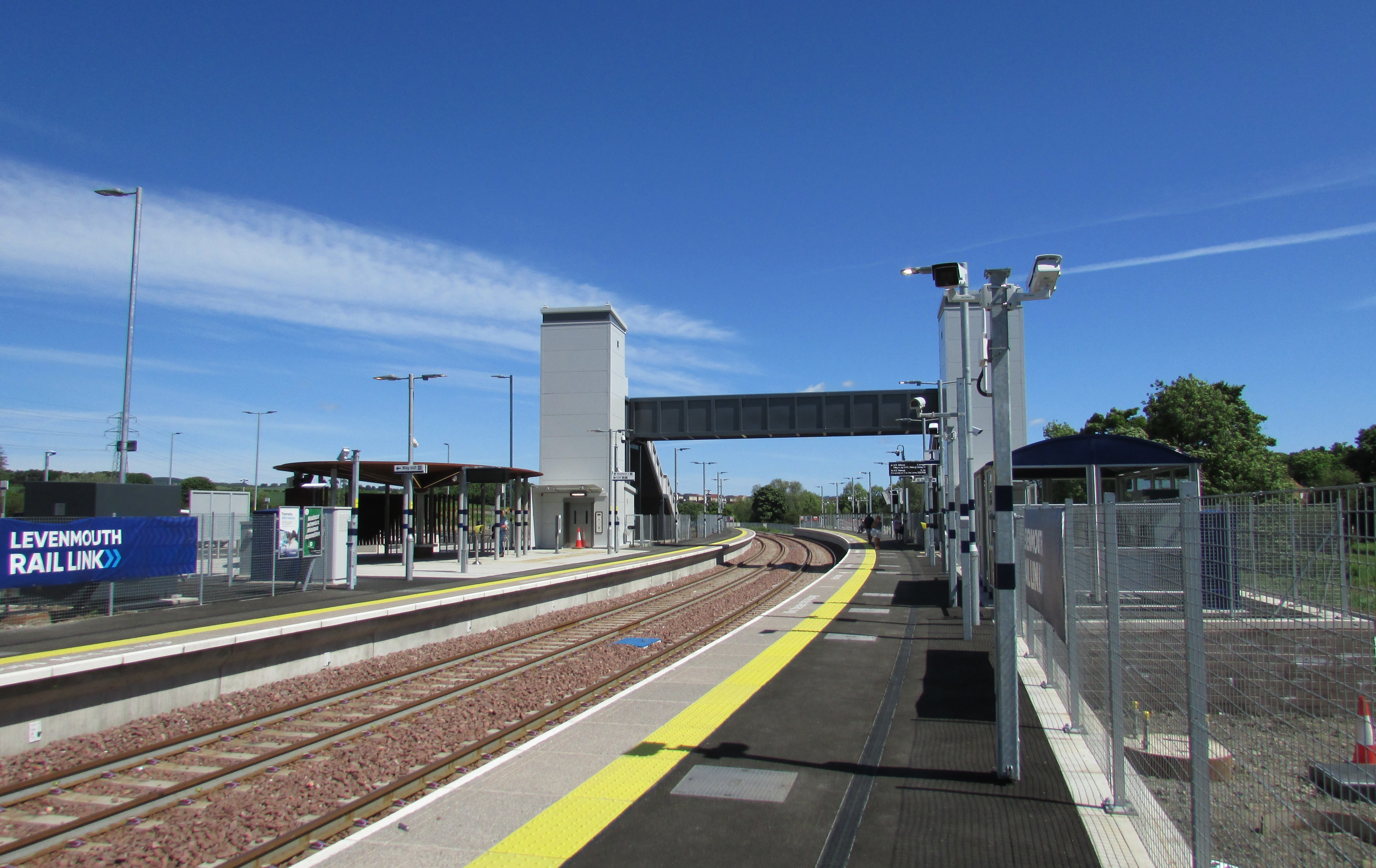
The new station at Cameron Bridge after reopening, 2024

Cameron Bridge railway station opened in June 2024 as part of the Levenmouth rail link. There was previously a station at Cameron Bridge around 400 m (440 yd) west of the current station, which shut in 1969.

== The Cameronbridge Grain Distillery ==
Cameronbridge Grain Distillery is currently the largest of the remaining grain distilleries in Scotland and is owned by Diageo.
