= Cameron Bridge railway station =

Railway station in Scotland

Cameron Bridge
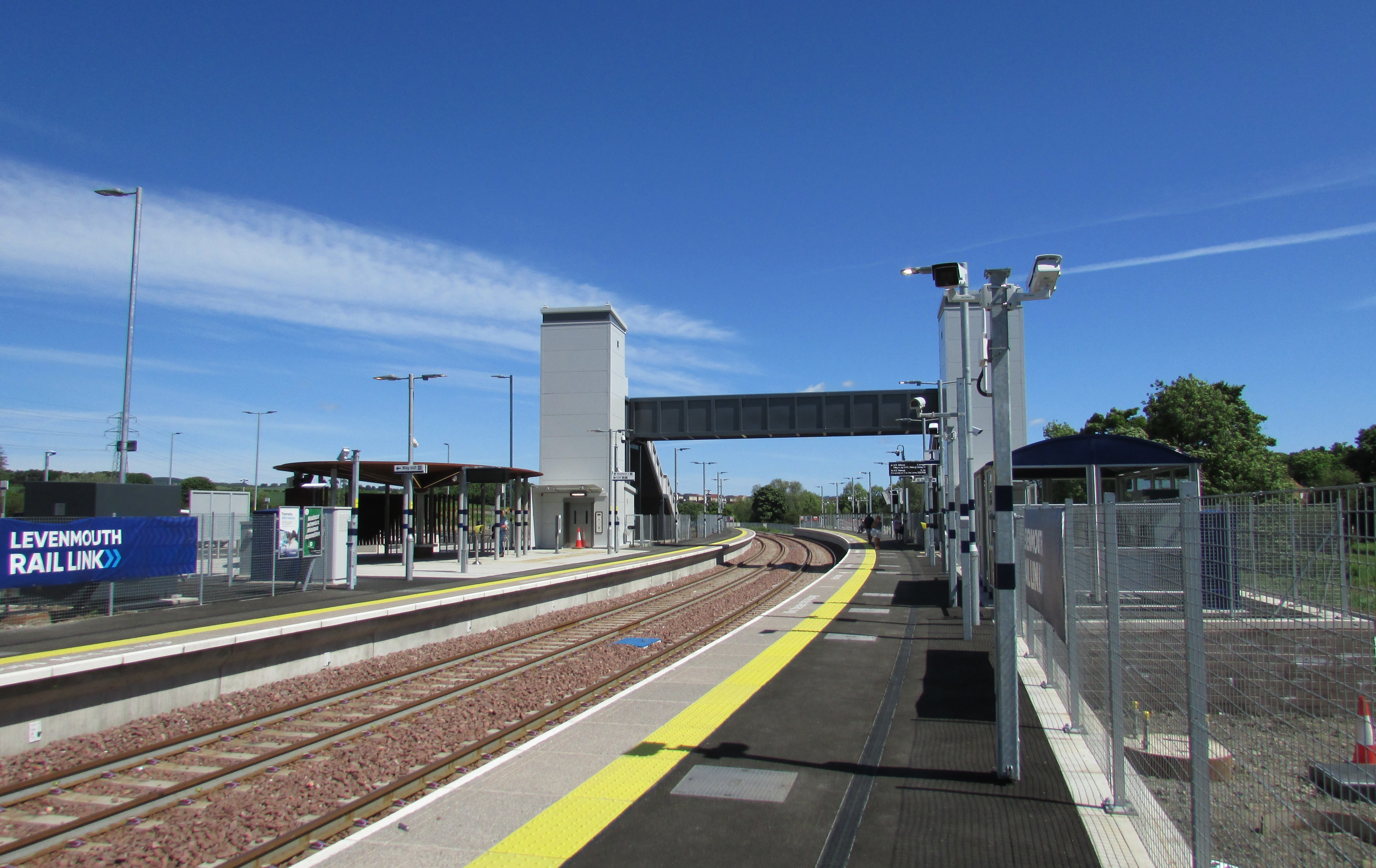
- Cameron Bridge station platforms in June 2024

General information
- Location: Cameron Bridge, Fife; Scotland
- Coordinates: 56.189693°N 3.046855°W
- Grid reference: NO3517800215 (new); NO347001 (old - razed)
- Platforms: 2 (reopened)
- Train operators: ScotRail

Construction
- Accessible: yes

Other information
- Status: Open
- Station code: CBX

History
- Original company: Leven Railway
- Pre-grouping: North British Railway
- Post-grouping: LNER

Key dates
- 10 August 1854: Opened
- 6 October 1969: Closed to passengers
- 1990s: Closed completely
- 2 June 2024: Resited and reopened

Passengers
- 2024/25: 45,796
- 2025/26: ▲76,654
Location
Notes
- Passenger statistics from the Office of Rail and Road

Cameron Bridge railway station serves the village of Cameron Bridge, Fife, Scotland. The station is on the Levenmouth rail link branch of the Fife Circle Line. It also serves Windygates, Buckhaven and Methil.

The present station was opened on 2 June 2024 as part of the Levenmouth rail link, a £116 million project funded by the Scottish Government. The new station is situated to the east of where the original station stood, on the other side of the main A915 road, and has two platforms.

== History ==
=== Original station ===
The station was opened on 10 August 1854 by the Leven Railway. It was situated near Cameronbridge Distillery, for which there were many sidings, and to the east of a level crossing on the road to Kirkcaldy and Cupar. The Muiredge Branch to the south also served a few collieries and Muiredge Goods. The station closed to passengers on 6 October 1969 but the distillery sidings operated until the 1990s. The remains of the station were demolished in 2022 as part of works to reopen the line.

=== New station ===
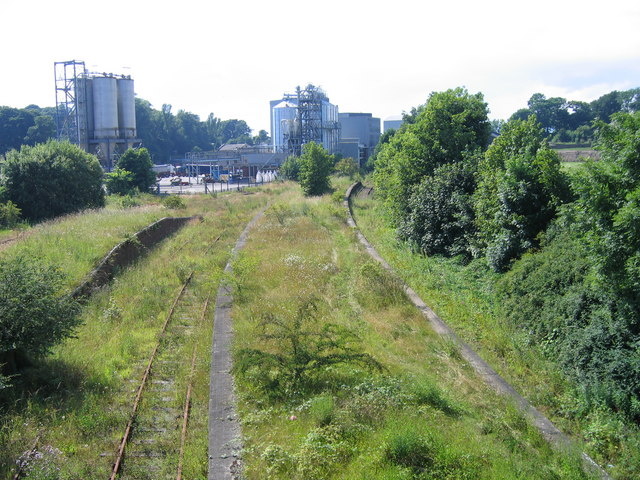
The site of the original station and distillery in July 2007

In December 2020, the site for the new station was confirmed. It was not possible to site a new station in the same location as the original due to the need to position it a minimum safe distance from Cameronbridge Distillery, under COMAH regulations. Instead, a greenfield site around 400 m (440 yd) to the east was chosen.

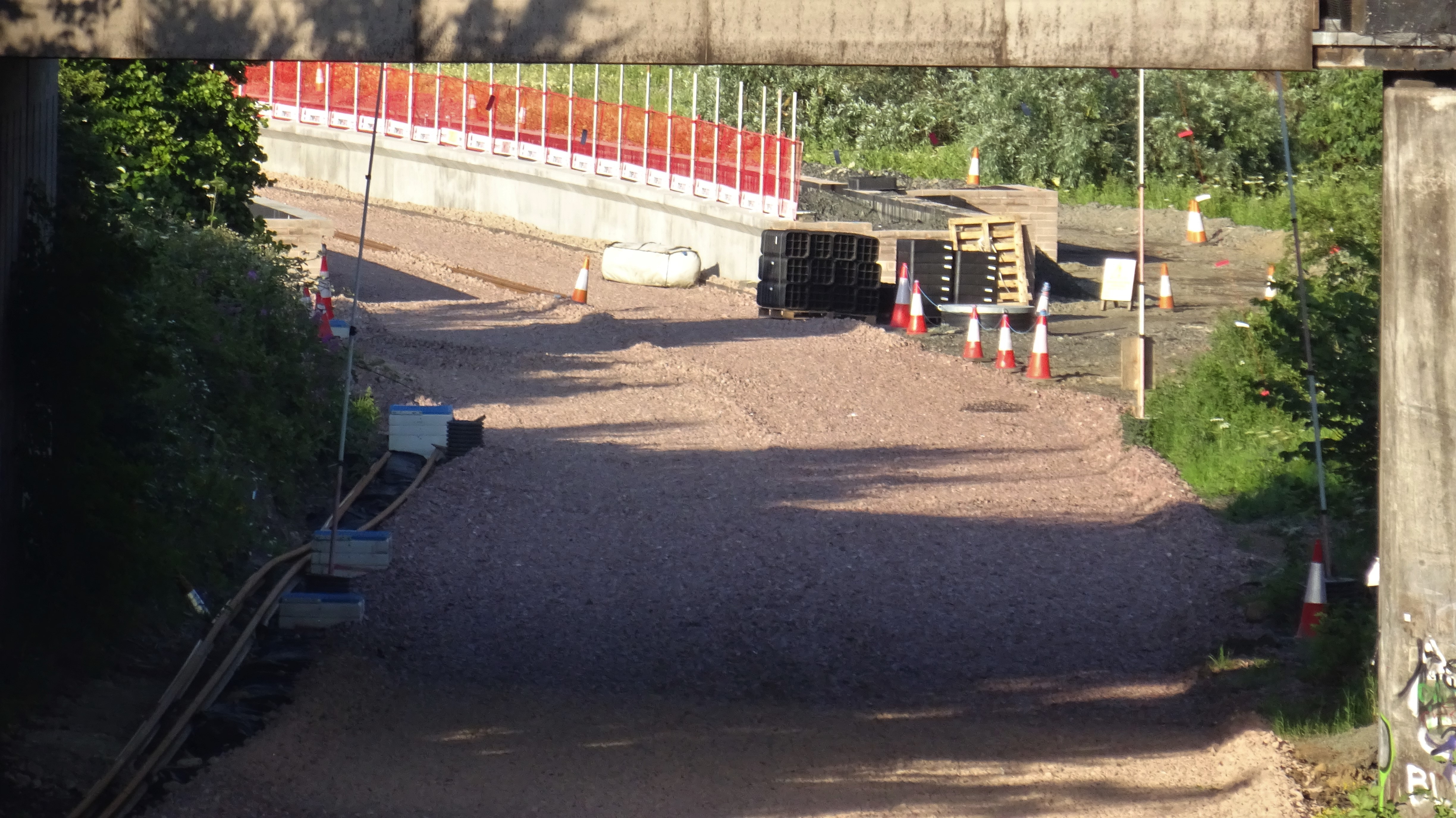
New Cameron Bridge station under construction in June 2023

Construction started in January 2023 and finished in January 2024. Driver training then commenced and in March, it was announced the station was expected to reopen on 2 June.

The station has two 196 m (643 ft) platforms connected by lifts and a footbridge. Facilities at the station include 16 cycle spaces and a 125 space car park, with space for an extra 300 spaces in future if needed as the station serves as a railhead for the local area.

A 140 m (460 ft) footbridge over the River Leven is also to connect the station to Methilhill area of Methil in a separate active travel project. However, this has now been delayed as the contractor for the bridge went into administration in April 2024 and whilst an interim solution is being sought, the bridge is not expected to be open until autumn 2024.

Moffat & Williamson have been awarded the daytime contract by Fife Council to provide the bus link. Stagecoach East Scotland have diverted services to call at the station during the evening and on Sundays.

== Services ==
Cameron Bridge has 2tph to Leven then 2tph to Edinburgh Waverley, with one operating via Kirkcaldy and the other operating via Dunfermline City. Sunday services operate at the same frequency however start around 3 hours later than the Monday-Saturday service.

Preceding station	National Rail	Following station
Kirkcaldy	ScotRail Levenmouth rail link	Leven
Glenrothes with Thornton	ScotRail Levenmouth rail link	Leven
Historical railways
Thornton Junction Line open, station closed	Fife Coast Railway	Leven Line and station reopened
