= Bawbee Bridge =

Bridge in Fife, Scotland

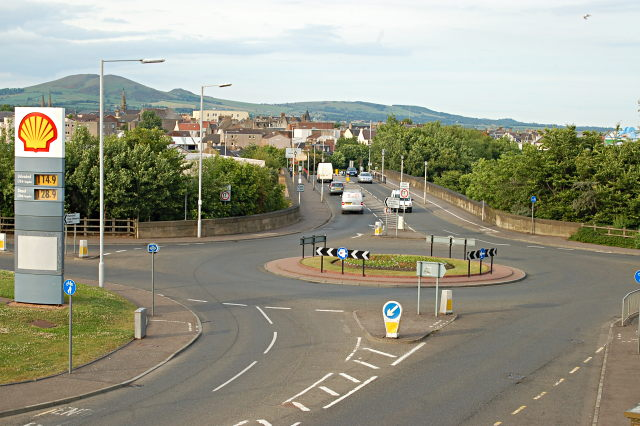
- Bawbee Bridge in 2008
- Coordinates: 56°11′33.13″N 3°0′10.83″W
- Carries: A955
- Crosses: River Leven, Levenmouth rail link
- Locale: Fife

Location
- Interactive map of Bawbee Bridge

Bawbee Bridge is a bridge connecting Leven and Methil in Levenmouth, Fife, Scotland.

== History ==
A new bridge, built at a cost of £200,000, was opened in 1958. It comprises two spans: one over the River Leven, the other over a railway line.

In 2022, it was confirmed that the span over the railway would be rebuilt at an expected cost of £8 million as part of the Levenmouth rail link project. The structure had deteriorated due to chlorine contamination and corrosion and had an 18-tonne weight restriction in place.

In 2022, the bridge was reduced to one lane of traffic to allow Openreach to divert cables. In March 2023, construction of a temporary bridge began. When completed in May, traffic will be diverted over it to allow Bawbee Bridge to be replaced.

The new Leven railway station is situated underneath the bridge.

== See also ==
- List of bridges in Scotland
