= Levenmouth =

Conurbation in Fife, Scotland

Coordinates: 56°12′N 3°0′W

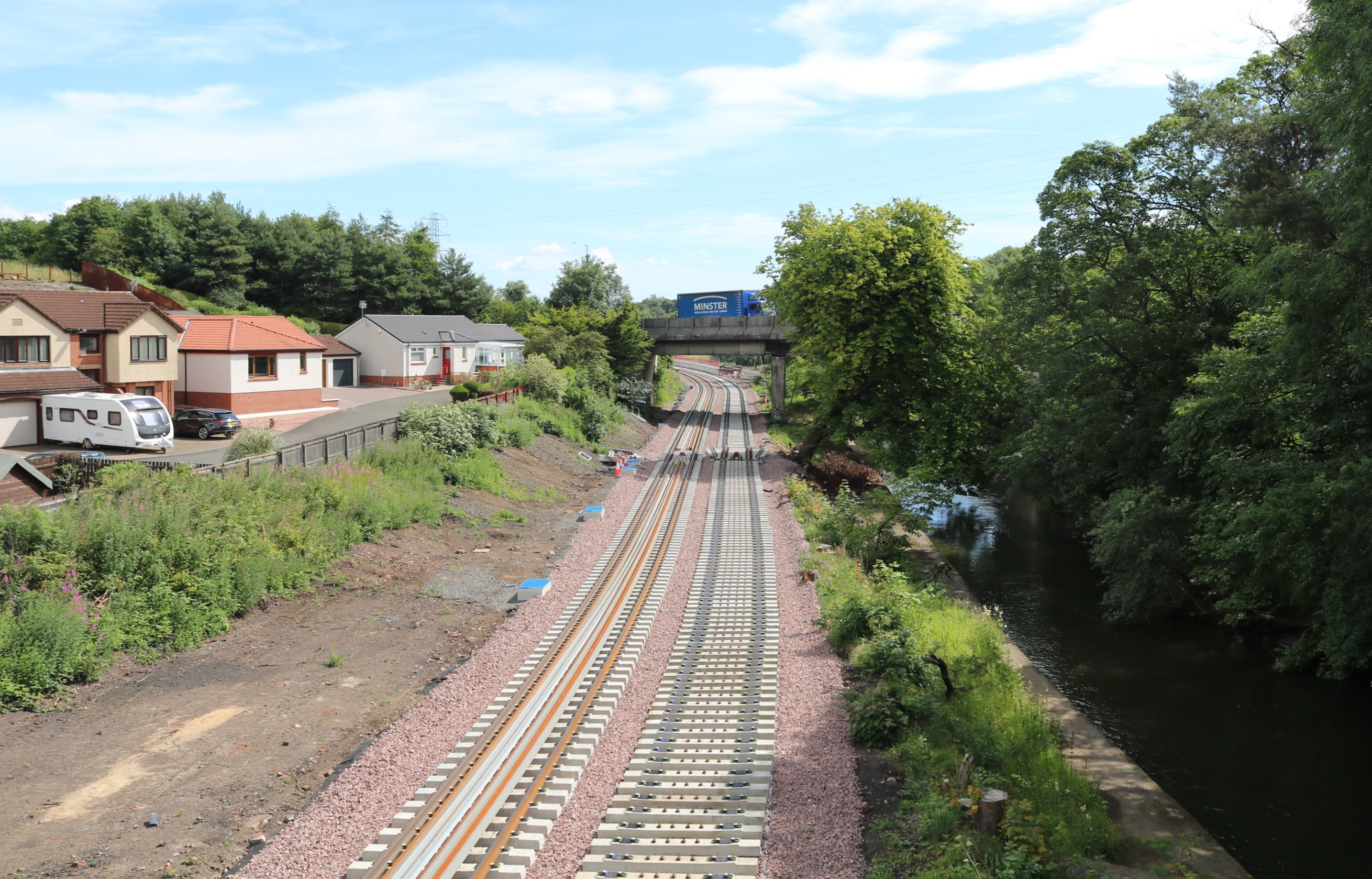
Levenmouth rail link in 2023

Levenmouth is a conurbation comprising a network of settlements on the north side of the Firth of Forth, in Fife on the east coast of Scotland. It consists of three principal coastal towns; Leven, Buckhaven, and Methil, and a number of villages and hamlets inland. The industrial towns of Buckhaven and Methil lie on the west bank of the River Leven, and the resort town of Leven is on the east bank. The "Bawbee Bridge" links the two sides of the river. Historically, Buckhaven and Methil were joined together as one burgh, while Leven was separate. The area had an estimated population of 37,238 in 2006.

Levenmouth's economy has traditionally been focused on heavy and traditional industries and has struggled economically since the closure of its coal mines. The main employers are Fife Scottish Omnibuses Ltd. Bi-Fab, Diageo, Donaldson Timber, Pfaudler Balfour and Silberline.

== History ==
=== Toponymy ===
The area is named after the mouth of the River Leven. The word 'Leven' comes from the Pictish word for 'flood' and was originally given to Loch Leven, the 'flood lake' at the head of the river.

=== Early history ===
The first mention of the town of 'Leven' was made in two separate records in the mid-15th century, with urgent need for repair work at the monastery at 'levynnis-mouth' and George Durie – an estate owner – became the keeper of the harbour at 'levynnismouth'.

=== 19th century ===
Until 1821, the only bridge across the river was the Cameron Brig on the main Kirkcaldy - Cupar road. In that year a pedestrian suspension bridge was built at Leven, which was replaced by a three-arched stone bridge in 1840. The toll to cross this bridge was a Scottish halfpenny, or bawbee. Even though the stone bridge was replaced by a single-span bridge in 1957, it is still known locally as the 'Bawbee Brig'.

In 1854 the Leven Railway opened, linking the town with Thornton Junction on the Edinburgh - Aberdeen main line. This helped it to become a tourist resort popular with visitors from the west of Scotland, and particularly Glasgow. Later in the 19th century the Leven Railway became part of a loop line of the North British Railway linking Thornton Junction and Leuchars Junction via St Andrews. The railway between Leven and St Andrews closed in 1964/65. The railway between Leven and Thornton Junction closed to freight in 1966 and passengers in 1969. On 8 August 2019, the Scottish Government announced that the line between Thornton Junction and Leven would reopen within five years.

With the growth of coal mining and activity at Methil docks, the two towns of Buckhaven and Methil expanded until they were merged into a single burgh in 1891.

== Administration ==
In 1975, the burghs were replaced by a two-tier system of Regional Councils and smaller District Councils. At this time Levenmouth fell under the control of Kirkcaldy District Council as part of the region of Fife. Further reforms in 1996 saw Fife Council become one of 32 unitary authorities.

Under the 1996 scheme Levenmouth is administered by an Area Committee of Fife Council. The boundaries were adjusted in 2007 to reflect the wards created for the introduction of proportional representation in local elections. Ward 22 extends the boundary east along Largo Bay, and the boundary of Ward 23 includes West Wemyss at its western end. In 2006, the population of Ward 22 (Leven, Kennoway and Largo) was 18,425 and that of Ward 23 (Buckhaven, Methil and Wemyss Villages) was 18,813, making a total of 37,238 people in the expanded committee area.

As of 2007 the Levenmouth Area Committee covers the following settlements :

- Buckhaven
- Methil
- Leven
- Kennoway
- Windygates
- East Wemyss
- Coaltown of Wemyss
- West Wemyss
- Lundin Links
- Upper Largo
- Lower Largo
- Drumeldrie
- Bonnybank
- Balcurvie

== Leisure and tourism ==
Leven boasts two golf courses, Scoonie and Leven Links - the latter being used as a qualifying course for The Open when the tournament is being played at the Old Course at St Andrews. There are also several other courses in the surrounding area notably Lundin Links, Elie and Crail.

Bayview Stadium is home to First Division East Fife Football Club. There is also work being undertaking on the former Kirkland railway marshalling yard which the Kingdom of Fife Railway Preservation Society is working towards creating a heritage centre for Fife's railway heritage with the additional proposal of running a heritage railway on the current mothballed Leven Railway.

== Economy ==
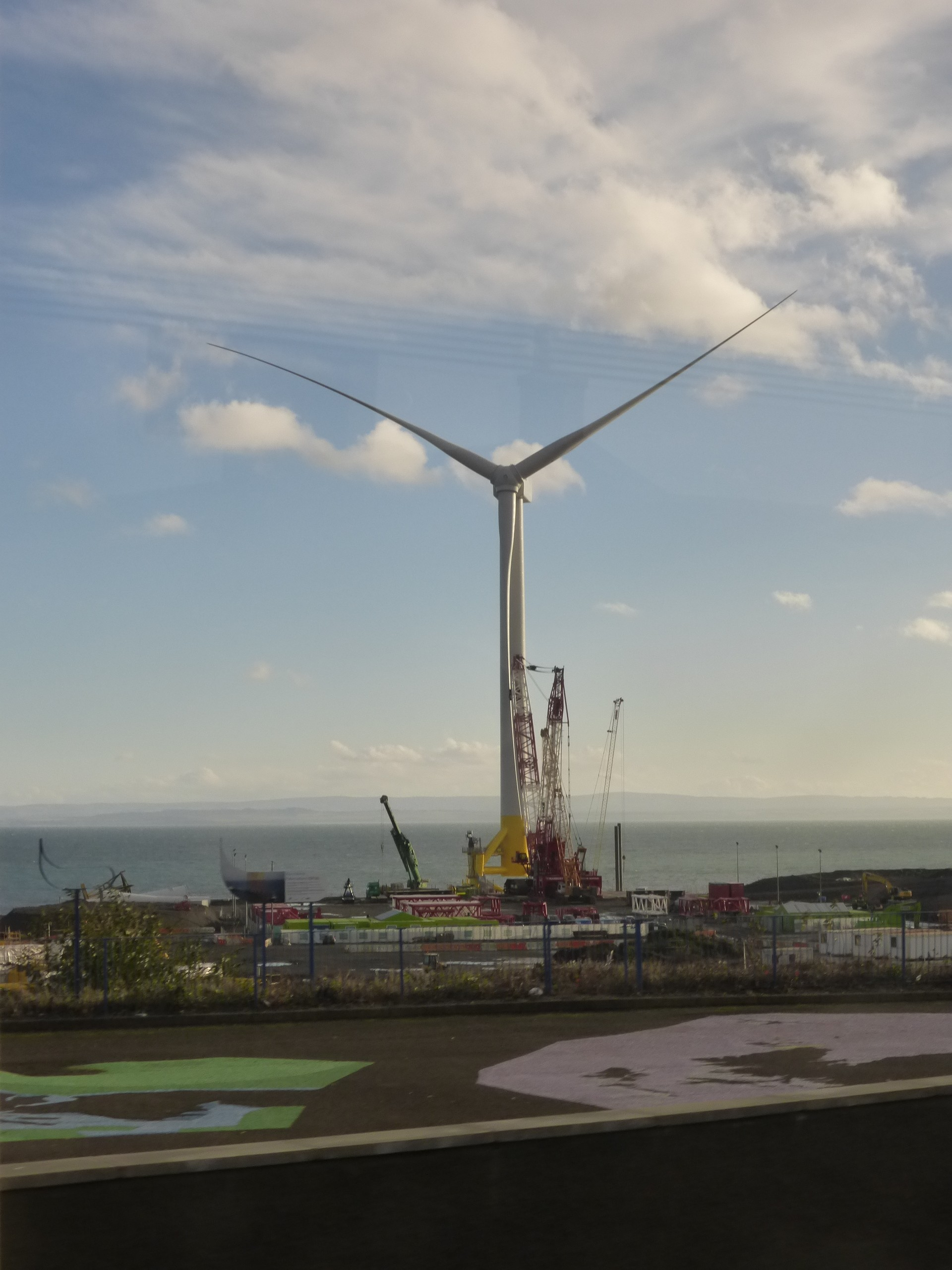
Wind turbine under construction at Methil

For years, Levenmouth has suffered from poor connections to the rail and main road network of Central Scotland, particularly since the closure of the last railway link in 1969, which came at the same time as the collapse of coal mining. The knock-on effect virtually sealed the fate of Methil Docks as a major port on the East of Scotland and the decline in tourism.

However, following a community campaign, the Scottish Government announced the reopening of the Leven rail link.

Leven is linked to Kirkcaldy by the A915 Standing Stone Road and Methil to Kirkcaldy through Dysart and East/West Wemyss, but the main A92 road through Fife bypasses the area.

The major employer now is the drinks manufacturer Diageo which has its main bottling plant in Leven, and one of the largest distilleries in the world at nearby Windygates. The Fife Energy Park opened in 2008, producing wind turbines at the former oil-rig building yard in Methil which was itself built on the former Wellesley Colliery.
