= Leven railway station =

Railway station in Scotland

Leven
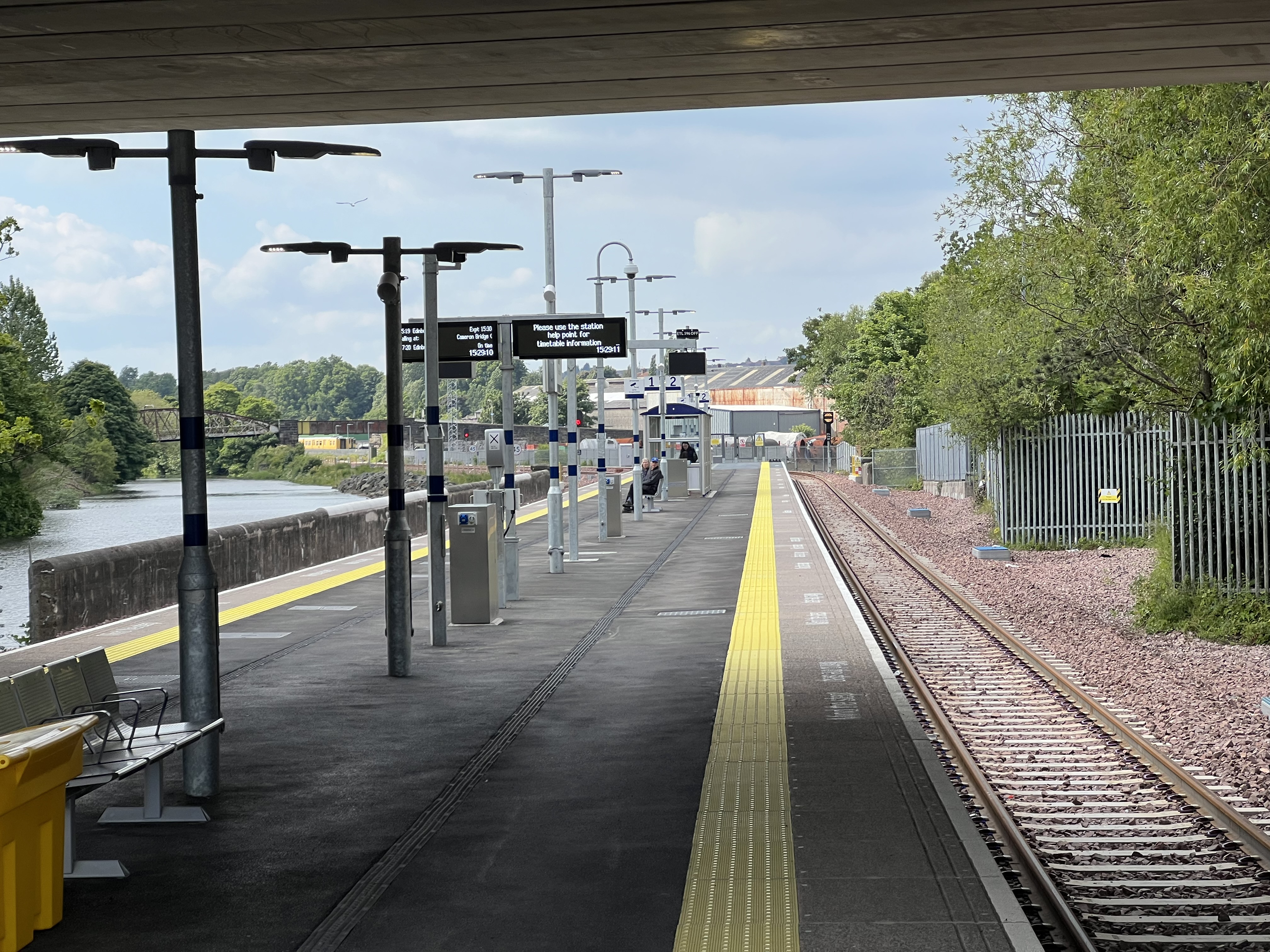
- The station's island platform in June 2024.

General information
- Location: Leven, Fife; Scotland
- Coordinates: 56.1923°N 3.002°W
- Grid reference: NO3794800442
- Platforms: 2

Construction
- Accessible: yes

Other information
- Status: Open
- Station code: LEV

History
- Original company: Leven Railway
- Pre-grouping: North British Railway
- Post-grouping: LNER

Key dates
- 10 August 1854: Opened
- 6 October 1969: Closed
- 2 June 2024: Resited and reopened

Passengers
- 2024/25: 185,424
Location
Notes
- Passenger statistics from the Office of Rail and Road

Leven railway station is the eastern terminus of the Levenmouth rail link, which connects the town of Leven, Fife with the Fife Circle Line at Thornton Junction, north of Kirkcaldy. The station is managed and served by ScotRail.

== History ==
=== Old alignment and station ===
Historically, there was a station at Leven on the Fife Coast Railway of the North British Railway, albeit in a different location. Leven was a through station, with services running as far as Anstruther. The line closed to passengers in 1969 and to goods traffic in 1999.

=== Reopening ===
Although campaign work to open the line to Leven had been ongoing since the line's closure in 1969, there was a significant increase in support in 2008, when £2m was promised in funding for its reopening.

After three STAG reports, The Scottish Government announced on 8 August 2019 that the line would be re-opened for passenger and potential freight services. In December 2020 four options were proposed for the new station site. In June 2021 the station site, near the town's swimming pool, was announced.

The station was opened on 29 May 2024, with scheduled passenger services starting on 2 June 2024.

== Site and facilities ==
The station is situated underneath Bawbee Bridge and has a 205-metre (224 yd) long island platform. The section of Bawbee Bridge which spans the railway was found to be in poor condition and needed to be replaced: construction of the platforms could only start once this was completed.

The station has step-free access with a ramp down from the end of the buffers. The car park has 133 spaces including 12 for electric cars. Cycle storage and a Scotrail welfare facility are provided near the waiting shelters.

== Services ==
Leven receives two trains per hour, with one operating via Kirkcaldy taking around 65 minutes and the other operating via Dunfermline City taking around 85 minutes.

Preceding station	National Rail	Following station
Cameron Bridge	ScotRail Levenmouth rail link	Terminus
	Disused railways	
Cameron Bridge	North British Railway Fife Coast Railway	Lundin Links
