= Lundin Links railway station =

Disused railway station in Lundin Links, Fife

Lundin Links
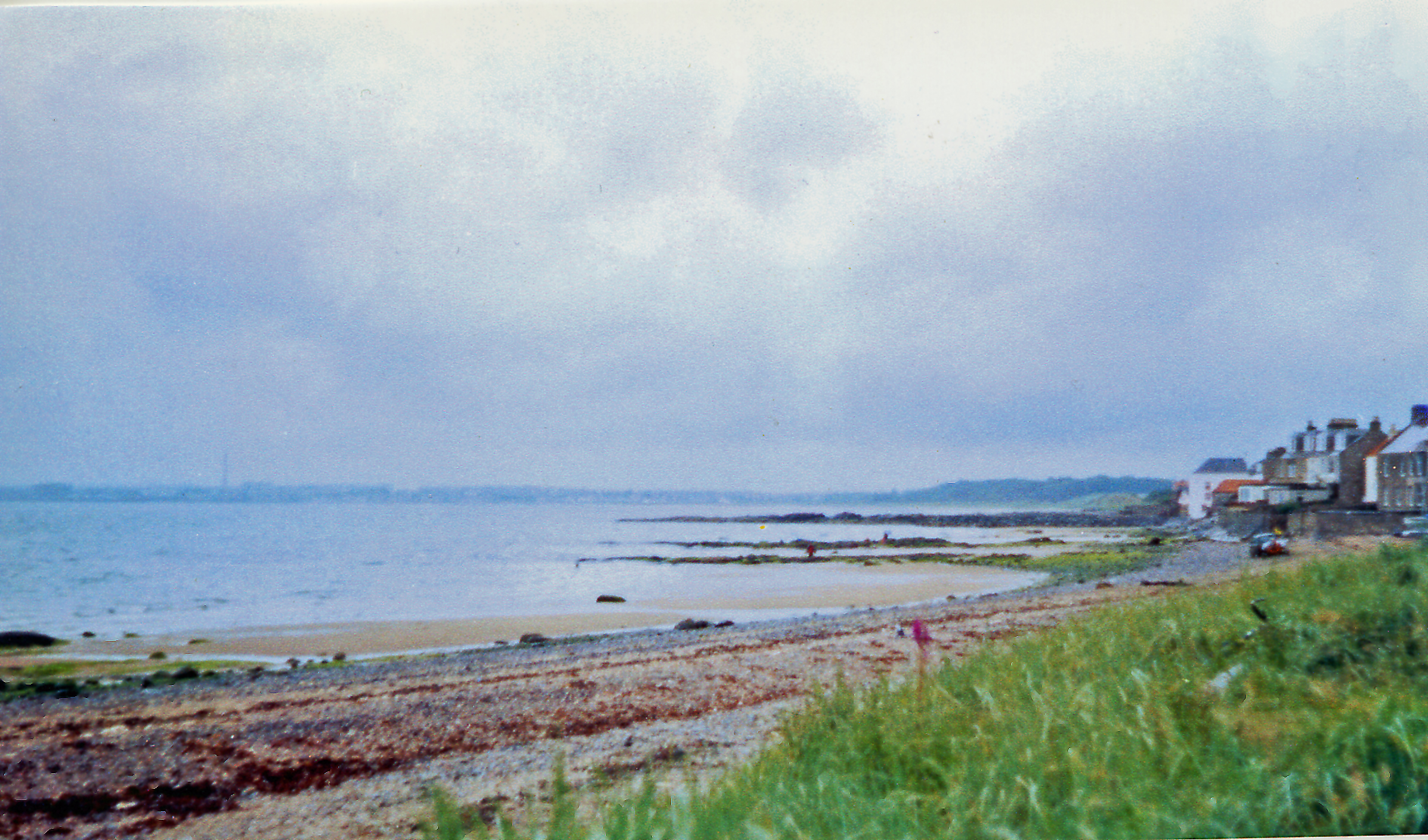
- The site of the station in 2002

General information
- Location: Lundin Links, Fife; Scotland
- Coordinates: 56.2104°N 2.9624°W
- Grid reference: NO404024
- Platforms: 1

Other information
- Status: Disused

History
- Original company: East of Fife Railway
- Pre-grouping: North British Railway
- Post-grouping: LNER

Key dates
- 11 August 1857: Opened
- 6 September 1965: Closed
Location

Lundin Links railway station served the village of Lundin Links, Fife, Scotland from 1857 to 1965 on the Fife Coast Railway.

== History ==
The station opened on 11 August 1857 by the East of Fife Railway.

The station had one platform to the north of the running line, there were two sidings behind the platform forming a small goods yard able to accommodate a limited range of goods including live stock, they were unable to deal with vehicles needing to be loaded on trains, the yard was equipped with a 1½ ton crane.

A camping coach was positioned here by the Scottish Region from 1953 to 1963, and there were two coaches here from 1956 to 1961.

The station closed to passengers on 6 September 1965. The line closed to goods traffic on 18 July 1966.

Preceding station	Disused railways	Following station
Leven; Line and station closed	Fife Coast Railway	Largo; Line and station closed
