= Largo railway station =

Disused railway station in Lower Largo, Fife

Largo

General information
- Location: Lower Largo, Fife; Scotland
- Coordinates: 56.2128°N 2.9398°W
- Grid reference: NO418026
- Platforms: 2

Other information
- Status: Disused

History
- Original company: Leven and East of Fife Railway
- Pre-grouping: North British Railway
- Post-grouping: LNER; British Rail (Scottish Region)

Key dates
- 11 August 1857: Opened
- 6 September 1965: Closed
Location

Largo railway station served the village of Lower Largo, Fife, Scotland from 1857 to 1965 on the East of Fife Railway.

== History ==
The station opened on 11 August 1857 by the Leven and East of Fife Railway. To the north was a good yard and to the east of the eastbound platform was the signal box. It was replaced in 1894 and was situated at the east end of the westbound platform. The station closed on 6 September 1965, with the signal box closing in the same year.

Preceding station	Disused railways	Following station
Kilconquhar; Line and station closed	East of Fife Railway	Lundin Links; Line and station closed
