= Kirkcaldy railway station =

Railway station in Fife, Scotland

Kirkcaldy Scottish Gaelic: Cair Chaladain
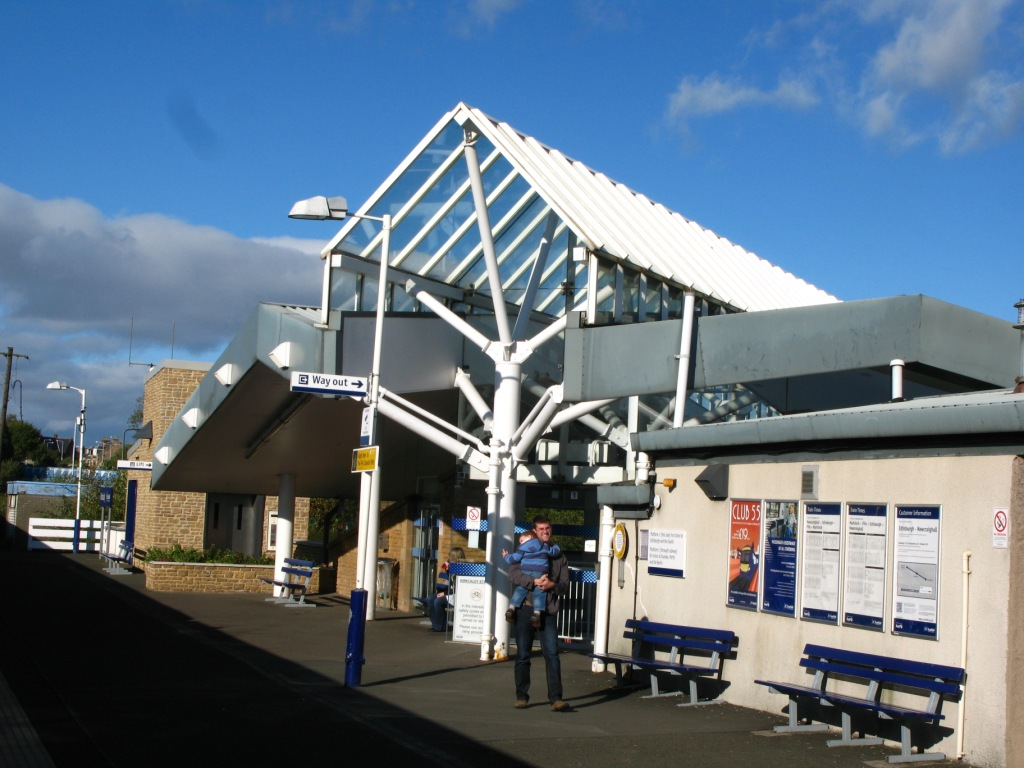
- The southbound platform in September 2011

General information
- Location: Kirkcaldy, Fife; Scotland
- Coordinates: 56.1119°N 3.1671°W
- Grid reference: NT275916
- Managed by: ScotRail
- Platforms: 2

Other information
- Station code: KDY

Key dates
- 20 June 1847: Opened
- 1964: Re-built
- 1991: South platform re-built

Passengers
- 2020/21: ▼0.139 million
- Interchange: ▼2,787
- 2021/22: ▲0.579 million
- Interchange: ▲11,887
- 2022/23: ▲0.642 million
- Interchange: ▼2,124
- 2023/24: ▲0.782 million
- Interchange: ▲5,380
- 2024/25: ▲0.856 million
- Interchange: ▲19,552
Location
Notes
- Passenger statistics from the Office of Rail and Road

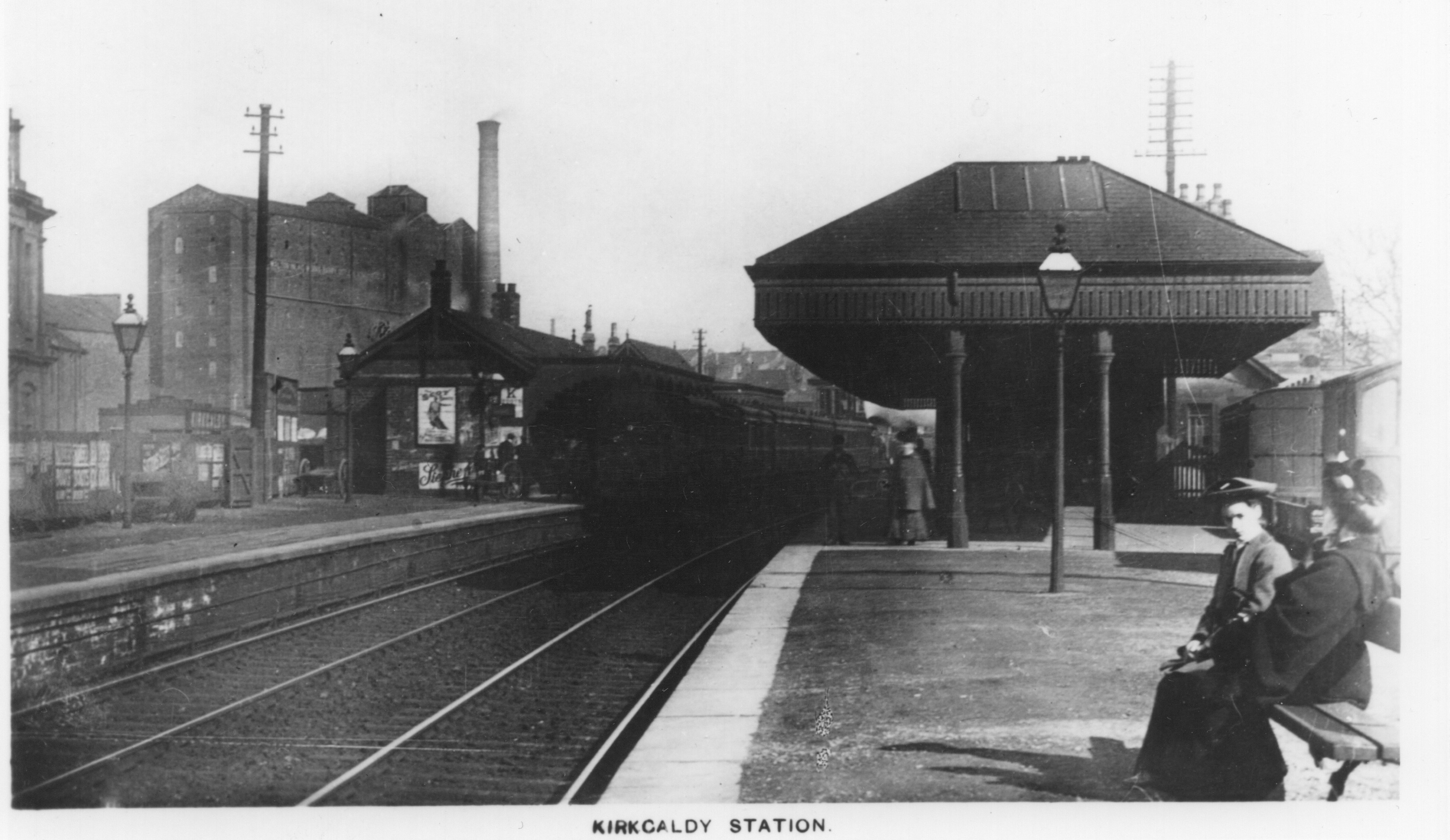
The station, circa 1910, facing north. In the background is the Barry, Ostlere and Shepherd Caledonia Linoleum Works.

Kirkcaldy railway station is a railway station in the town of Kirkcaldy, Fife, Scotland. The station is managed by ScotRail and is on the Fife Circle Line and principal East Coast Main Line, 26 miles (42 km) north east of Edinburgh Waverley. British Transport Police maintain a small office on Platform 1.

The station is located on Station Road, with an entrance on Whyte Melville Road. There are car parks on either side with an extension on the Whyte Melville Road side for Edinburgh commuter traffic. The station building is situated on the Edinburgh platform. In the building is a ticket office (at street level), toilets, public phone, photo booth and shop.

Platforms are adjoined by a connecting subway and a flight of stairs. Two lifts have recently been installed for north and south platform access.

There are waiting rooms on both platforms and CCTV is in operation. Train running information is provided via CIS displays, automatic announcements and customer help points.

There are three main railway station bus stops located on Bennochy Road (off Station Road) with access to the car park. A further two bus stops are located on Whyte Melville Road, one of which is adjacent to the entrance and the other opposite University of Dundee Nursing Kirkcaldy Campus.

== History ==
A proposal to bring two railway lines to the town had been suggested as far back as 1836, but neither plan succeeded. This led for pressure to support a new line from Burntisland to Newport-on-Tay and Tayport via Kinghorn, Kirkcaldy, Markinch and Cupar in 1840. However, it was three years before Parliament even acknowledged this essential plan. A unanimous decision was passed in favour by both the House of Lords and Commons. Kirkcaldy railway station, along with now defunct stations in Sinclairtown and Dysart, finally opened on 20 June 1847 as part of the Edinburgh and Northern Railway, which terminated at Cupar. Train services were later taken over by the North British Railway, which was absorbed by the London and North Eastern Railway in 1923. The nationalised British Railways took over in 1948.

Originally, only the south platform was covered, until a re-fit of the station was undertaken towards the end of the 19th century. In the late 19th and early 20th centuries, the station was surrounded by various linoleum works, which had sidings allowing the product to be shipped via the main line.

The station buildings survived intact until they were re-built in 1964, probably as part of the controversial town centre redevelopment plan. A fire in the late 1980s led to the destruction of the south platform. A new south platform had to be built again from scratch, and this was officially re-opened again to the public in 1991.

== Services ==
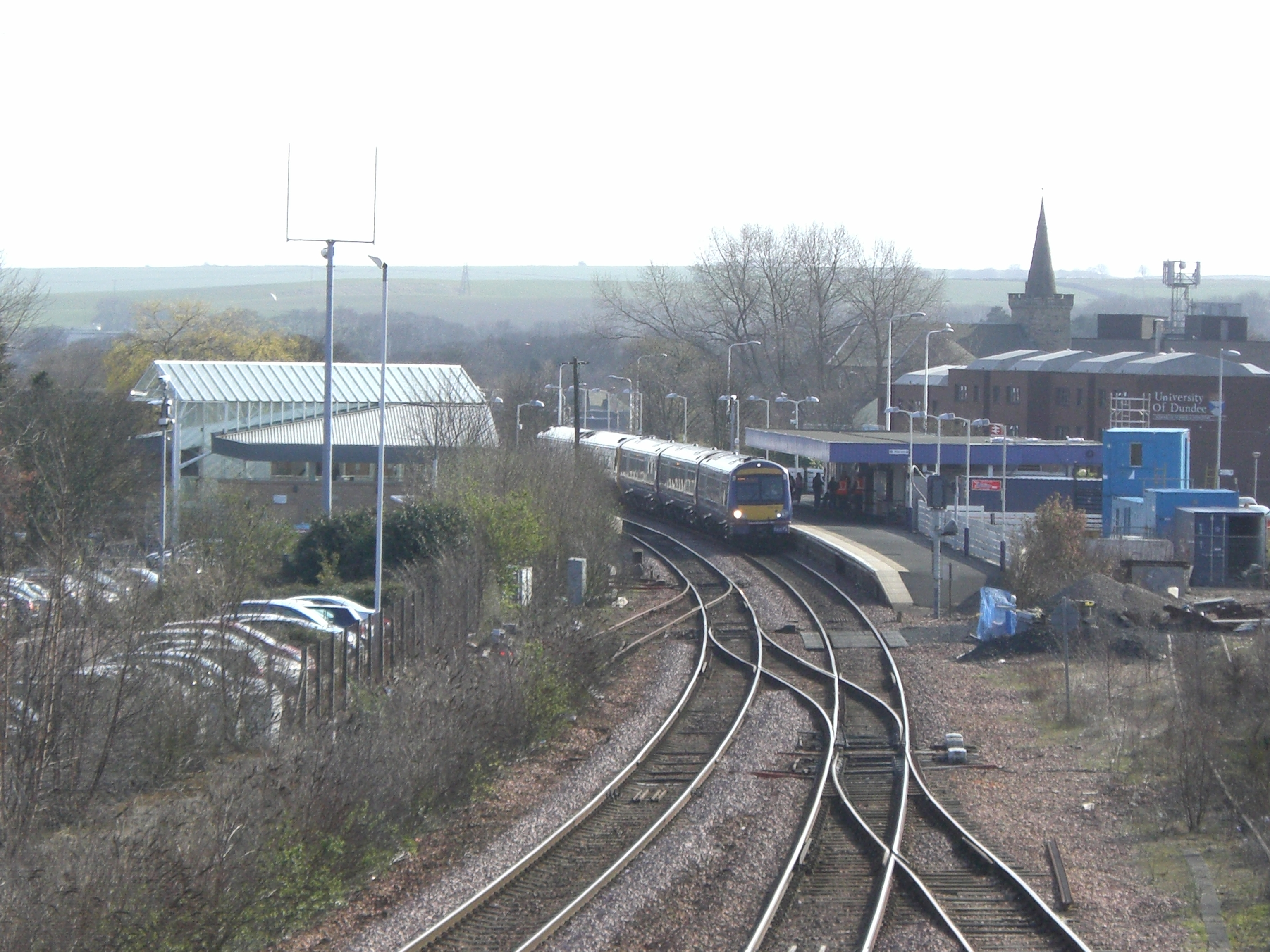
A northbound service calls at Kirkcaldy

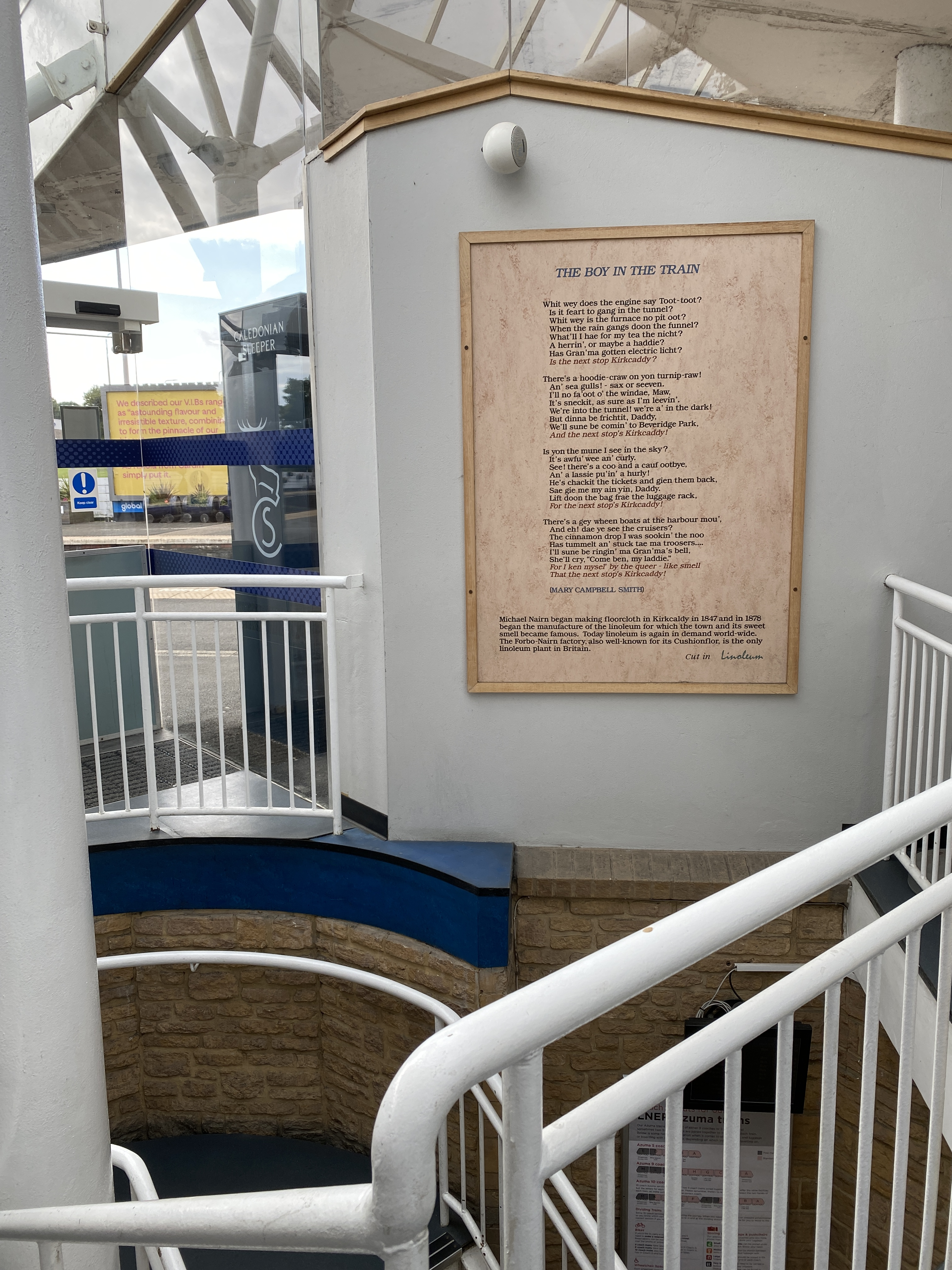
The "Boy in the Train" by Mary Campbell Smith (1869-1960) is a well known poem about Kirkcaldy, featuring arrival at Kirkcaldy Railway Station and the smell of the linoleum factories nearby. It is now mounted above the stairs to platform 1 in Kirkcaldy Railway Station.

=== Southbound ===
- 2 trains per hour to Edinburgh Waverley (semi-fast).
- 1 train per day to Edinburgh Waverley calling at all stations.
- 3 trains per day to London King's Cross and stations via the East Coast Main Line, plus a fourth that runs as far as Leeds.
- 1 train per day (except Saturdays) to London Euston (Caledonian Sleeper).
- 1 train per hour to Edinburgh Waverley (limited stop) Evenings only.
- 1 train per day to Penzance.

There is also a limited service to North Queensferry and Dalmeny.

On Sundays, there are two semi-fast trains per hour to Edinburgh and one all-stations local service.

=== Northbound ===
- 1 train per hour to Leven
- 1 train per hour to Perth
- 1 train per hour to Dundee
- 1 train per day to Glenrothes with Thornton (peak time)
- 9 services per day to Aberdeen. ScotRail Edinburgh to Aberdeen services do not usually stop at Kirkcaldy (except during the a.m peak and in the late evening). 4 London North Eastern Railway services call during the daytime. The Caledonian Sleeper also calls, but only to set down. CrossCountry's one train per day to Aberdeen also calls here.

On Sundays, there are hourly services to Dundee and northbound along the Fife Circle, plus two-hourly services to Aberdeen.

Preceding station	National Rail	Following station
Kinghorn	ScotRail; Levenmouth rail link	Cameron Bridge
Kinghorn	ScotRail; Edinburgh–Dundee line	Markinch
Kinghorn	ScotRail; Fife Circle Line	Markinch
Glenrothes with Thornton	ScotRail; Fife Circle Line	Markinch
Inverkeithing	CrossCountry; Cross Country Route	Markinch
Inverkeithing	Caledonian Sleeper; Highland Caledonian Sleeper	Leuchars
Inverkeithing	London North Eastern Railway; Northern Lights (London – Aberdeen)	Leuchars
	Historical railways	
Sinclairtown; Line open, station closed	North British Railway; Edinburgh and Northern Railway	Kinghorn; Line and station open
