= Bonnybank =

Coordinates: 56.2196°N 3.0395°W

- Village
- Interactive map of Bonnybank
- Country: Scotland
- Local Authority: Fife
- Ward: Leven, Kennoway and Largo
- UK Constituency: Glenrothes
- Scottish Constituency: Mid Fife and Glenrothes

Population (2011)
  - Total: 90
- Time zone: Greenwich Mean Time
- Postal code: KY8 5SX

Bonnybank is a small village in the Levenmouth area of Fife, approximately 2 miles north of Leven and situated on the main road (the A916) between Kennoway and Cupar. The population make-up is vastly white (99%), with an even split between males and females.
