= Lundin Links =

Coordinates: 56.21135°N 2.96084°W

- Location within Fife
- OS grid reference: NO405025
- Council area: Fife
- Lieutenancy area: Fife
- Country: Scotland
- Sovereign state: United Kingdom
- Post town: LEVEN
- Postcode district: KY8
- Police: Scotland
- Fire: Scottish
- Ambulance: Scottish
- UK Parliament: North East Fife
- Scottish Parliament: Mid Fife and Glenrothes

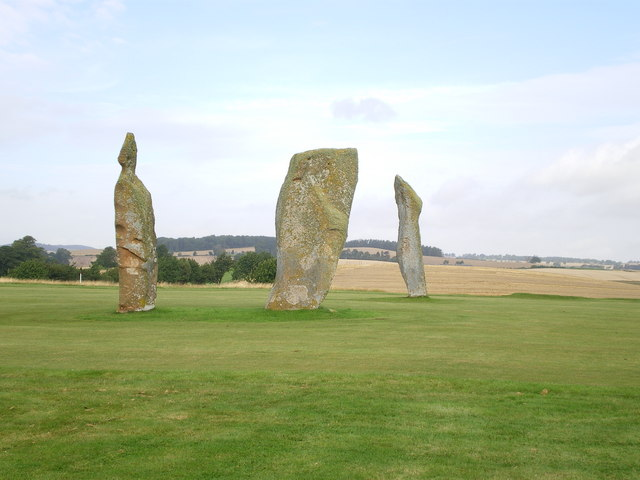
Standing stones on the ladies' course

Lundin Links is a small village in the parish of Largo on the south coast of Fife in eastern central Scotland.

The village was largely built in the 19th century to accommodate tourists visiting the village of Lower Largo. Lundin Links is contiguous with Lower Largo. The name reflects the Lundin family, former landowners in the area. Lundin House was demolished in 1876 but its Tower remains.

The former Lundin Links railway station, originally on the East of Fife Railway, operated from 1857 to 1965.

The village has two golf courses. The 18-hole course, Lundin Golf Club, was used as a pre-qualifying course when The Open Championship is held at St. Andrews. Lundin Ladies' Golf Club (a 9-hole course) is the oldest women's golf course in the world.

On the second fairway of the ladies' course there is a cluster of three standing stones dating from the 2nd millennium BC that form a megalithic four-poster (one of the stones was lost around 1792).

A Pictish-era graveyard has been exposed by coastal erosion and is the subject of archæological investigation.

== Notable residents ==
- Dame Anne Bryans (1909–2004)
- Angus Black (1925–2018) rugby player
- Thom Yorke was raised in Lundin Links
- The Baronets of Lundin & Montrave
- Ruth Davidson (now Baroness Davidson of Lundin Links)
- Nick Wade (Australian Football League Boundary Umpire)
