= Buckhaven and Methil =

Buckhaven and Methil was a burgh of Scotland, centred on the towns of Buckhaven and Methil. It formed in 1891 and was abolished in 1975.

Buckhaven and Methil exist today as two towns although both are within the Levenmouth area according to a description given by Fife Council.

== See also ==
- Levenmouth
