= Balcurvie =

Town in Fife, United Kingdom

Coordinates: 56.197°N 3.057°W

Balcurvie is a Scottish rural hamlet located within the Windygates district of Levenmouth in Fife.

People from Balcurvie include agriculturalist Sir Robert Blyth Greig FRSE (1874–1947).
