= Levenmouth rail link =

Rail line in Scotland

Levenmouth Rail Link
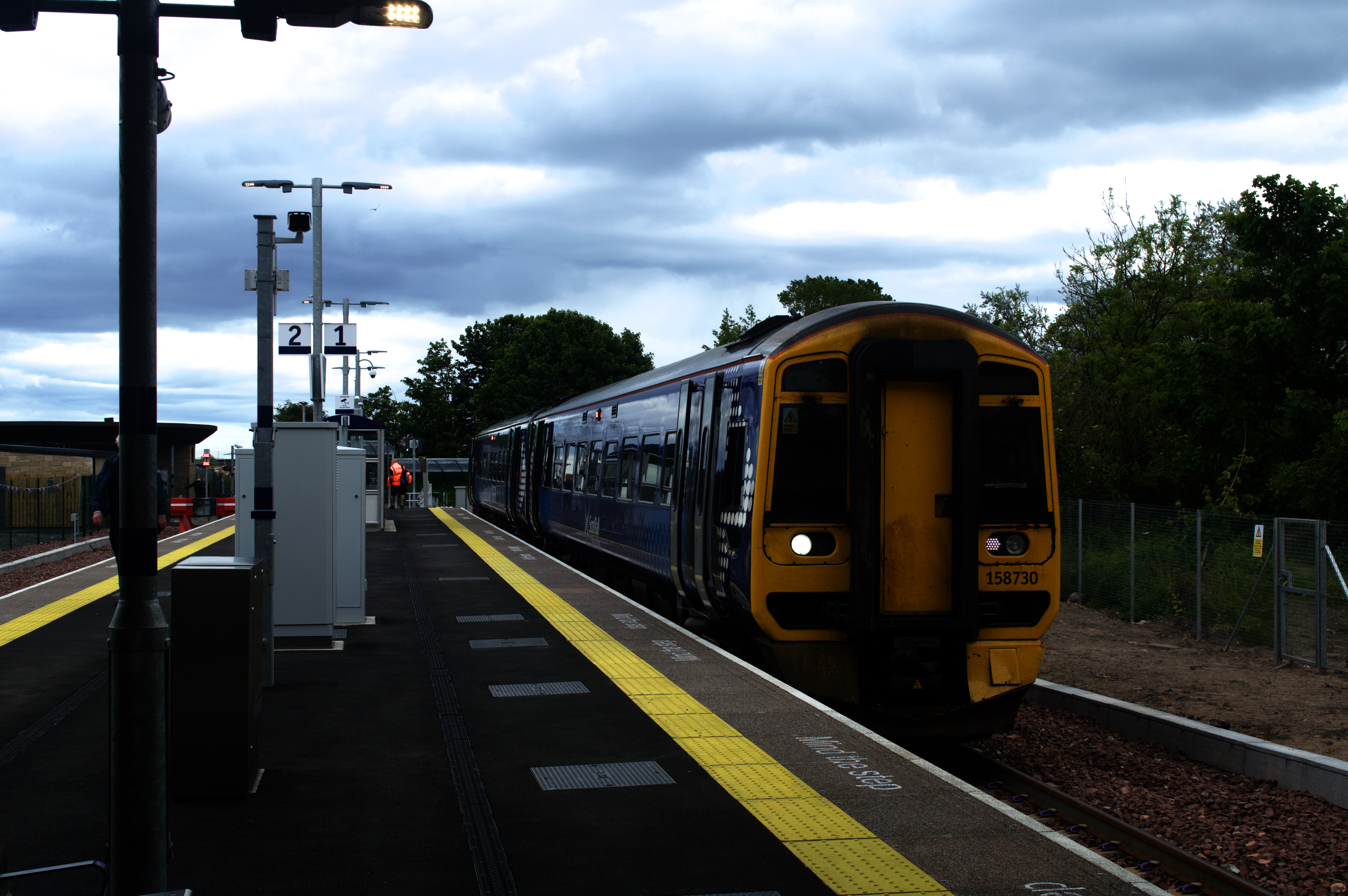
- A Class 158 at Leven

Overview
- Status: Operational
- Owner: Network Rail
- Locale: Levenmouth, Fife, Scotland
- Termini: Leven; Edinburgh
- Stations: 2

Service
- Type: Heavy rail
- System: National Rail
- Operator: ScotRail
- Rolling stock: Class 158; Class 170

History
- Opened: 3 July 1854
- Closed: 1969 (passenger service); 2001 (freight); 2012–2015 – first mile used for freight
- Reopened: 2 June 2024

Technical
- Number of tracks: Double (except for Thornton Junction)
- Track gauge: 4 ft 8 1/2 in (1,435 mm) standard gauge
Route map
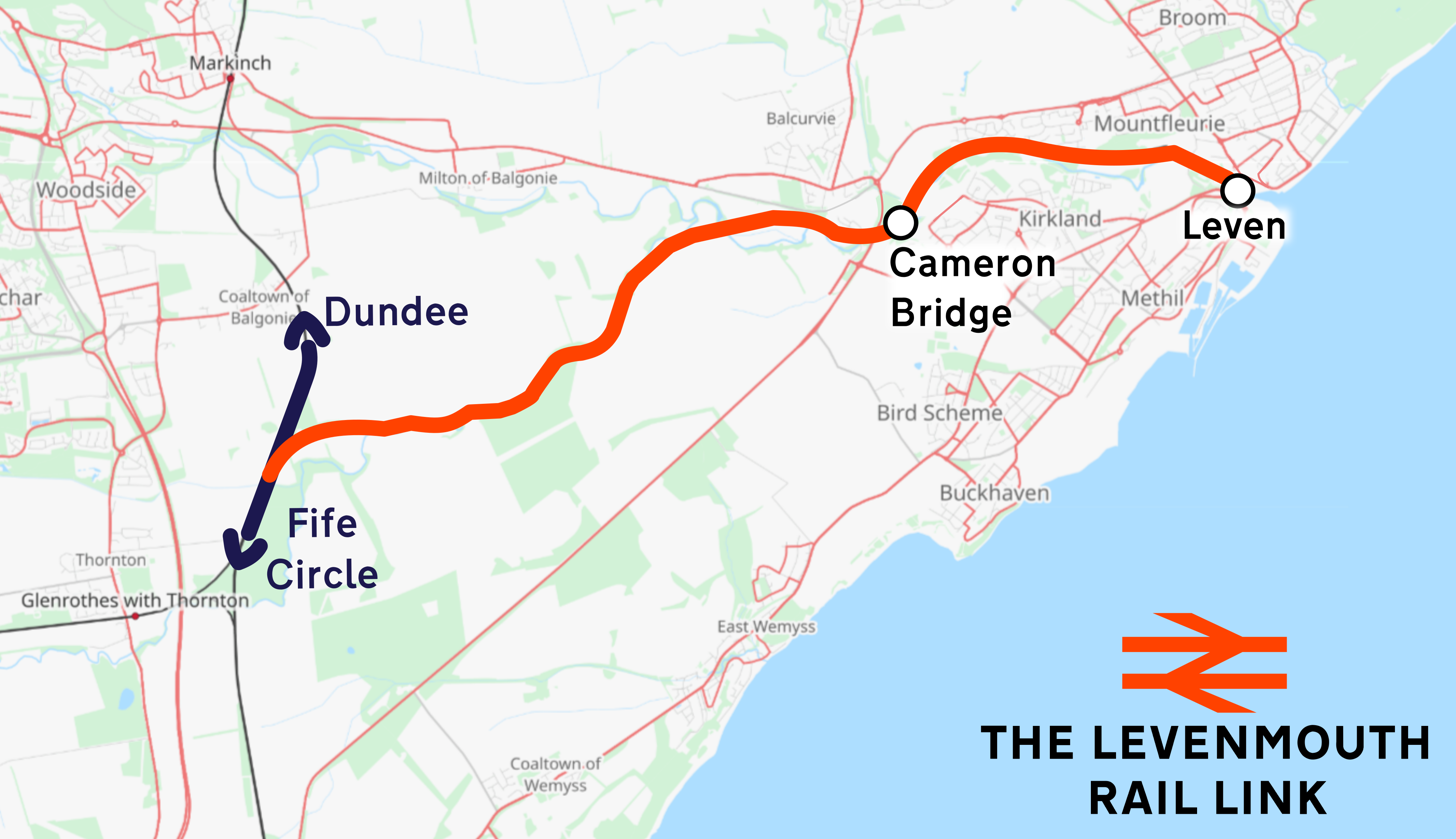
(Click to expand)

The Levenmouth rail link (also called the Leven rail link) is a reopened five-mile (eight-kilometre) branch line railway in Fife, Scotland. The link connects the town of Leven and other settlements in the Levenmouth conurbation with Thornton, and joins the Fife Circle Line at Thornton North Junction. The line was promoted by Fife Council and the South East Scotland Transport Partnership (SESTRAN). The plan was approved by the Scottish Government on 8 August 2019. The line was formally opened by the First Minister of Scotland, John Swinney, on 29 May 2024. Scheduled passenger services began on 2 June 2024.

== History ==
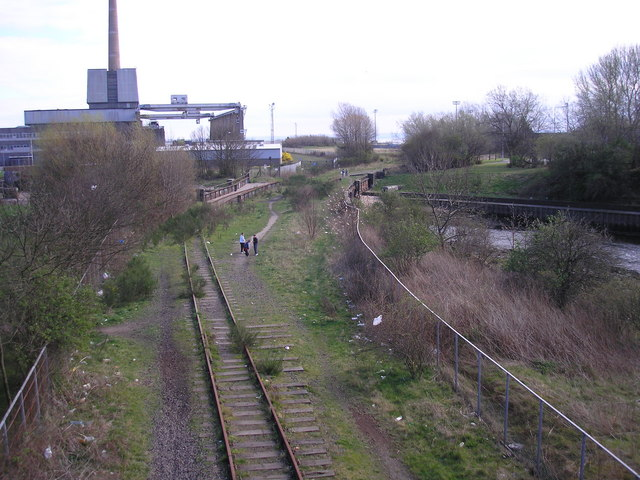
Methil power station (now demolished) with the disused railway in the foreground

The line first opened as the Leven Railway on 3 July 1854 after receiving authorisation in the Leven Railway Act 1852 (15 & 16 Vict. c. xcv). The line served stations at Cameron Bridge and Leven. The East of Fife Railway merged with the Leven Railway in 1861, forming the Leven and East of Fife Railway. The station at Leven was moved to a new site in 1885, and in 1909 the line was doubled. Freight east of Leven ceased in 1966, bringing a closure of the line up to St Andrews. Passenger services on the line to Leven ceased in 1969, and in 1972, the remainder of the line to the Kirkland yard at Leven was converted to single track.

The route remained open as a freight only line to serve the Cameronbridge distillery, Kirkland yard and Methil power station, the terminus of the line. Carbon dioxide produced by the distillery at Cameronbridge was carried by rail, whilst coal slurry from collieries around Fife was delivered to Methil power station using the line. The last services ran on the line in 2001, at the time Methil power station was mothballed. The line was unused entirely until 2011, when one mile of the route was reopened to serve a loading point for the opencast coal mine at Earlseat. Freight services ran on this section of track between 2012 and 2015.

== Reopening ==
The Levenmouth area was the largest urban area in Scotland unserved by any direct rail link, with a population of around 33,000. The catchment area of the line, which includes parts of the East Neuk of Fife, is around 43,000, and as such was identified by Campaign for Better Transport as a priority 1 candidate for reopening.

Campaigns for the reinstatement of passenger services on the route have occurred since passenger services were withdrawn in 1969. This includes a 2,000-signature petition in 2001 to Fife Council. There was a significant increase in campaigning in 2008, when the Airdrie–Bathgate rail link and Borders Railway were being authorised by the Scottish Parliament. Fife Council put forward £2 million to support the reopening, with the costs initially estimated at £28 million. This estimate was later increased to £45–55 million by the end of 2008.

SESTRAN conducted a feasibility study and Fife Council declared the project as a top-priority transport project. The initial findings from the study found that there was strong support for the link as well as a strong general case for it. The study also reviewed potential train services, and found there was a possibility of extending Edinburgh-Kirkcaldy services to Leven to give an hourly service to Leven, or extending both these services and the Edinburgh-Cowdenbeath services, giving a half-hourly service. It was hoped during the 2008 studies that coal and whisky freight could be carried on the line, and that the developments will encourage regeneration of the area. A later study in 2008 found that it was unlikely that work could begin on the line until 2015 at the earliest.

Campaigning for the reintroduction of passenger services continued and in 2015 Fife Council prepared a second STAG (Note: Scottish Transport Appraisal Guidance, a Scottish Government process) Report. This again reported a favourable cost-benefit analysis with capital costs of £78.4 million (based on 2010 prices). The plans had been further refined by this stage, with a planned extension to Methil docks being removed as a result of demand analysis and land ownership issues.

A third STAG report was prepared during 2018 and early 2019 for Transport Scotland. The preliminary options appraisal looked at a total of twelve improvements to public transport for the Levenmouth area, including upgrading bus services between Levenmouth and existing stations on the Fife Circle rail line, new rapid bus services between Levenmouth and Edinburgh, an entirely new railway on a new alignment between Markinch and Levenmouth, a hovercraft service between Levenmouth, Kirkcaldy and Edinburgh, and reinstatement of the disused railway between Leven and Thornton North Junction.

These were reduced to a total of six options in the preliminary options final report in May 2019: the only remaining rail option was the reinstatement of the line between Leven and Thornton Junction. The remaining five options were a series of upgrades to public transport facilities and bus services, and improvements to 'active travel networks' which would see improved walking and cycling opportunities in combination with any upgrades to bus services and the reintroduction of rail services.

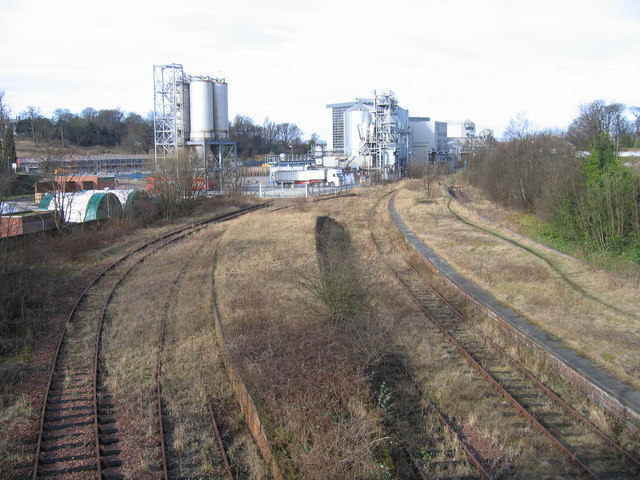
The disused Cameron Bridge railway station with the Diageo Cameronbridge distillery in the background in March 2008. The station here was demolished and a new passenger station built further away from the distillery.

The Scottish Government announced on 8 August 2019 that the line would be re-opened for passenger and potential freight services. Passenger services began on Sunday 2 June 2024. Although there will be no freight users when the line reopens, there remains potential for freight use in the future. Improvements to local connecting bus services will begin on Monday 3 June 2024. There will also be improvements to walking and cycling routes.

The full route remained the property of Network Rail and unlike the Borders Railway which required the Waverley Railway (Scotland) Act 2006, no such Act of the Scottish Parliament was required for the Levenmouth rail link. The reopened line serves stations at Leven and Cameron Bridge. Cameron Bridge station serves as a park and ride for surrounding areas.

Preparatory work, including vegetation clearance, began in 2020. In May 2021 sleepers for the line were delivered and at the end of July 2021 work began on removing the old abandoned trackwork. The main delivery phase of the project kicked off in March 2022 and work at Leven station began in February 2023.

By January 2024, infrastructure works were largely completed, with testing and driver training underway. The route was formally opened on 29 May 2024 by First Minister John Swinney, with scheduled service commencing on 2 June 2024.

In September 2025, Transport Secretary Fiona Hyslop announced that the plans to electrify the Levenmouth rail link along with Borders Railway would go ahead, with work near Leven already started. ScotRail is to procure new battery electric trains to run on the route, replacing the existing 40 year old stock. These will run on battery between Kinghorn and Dalmeny over the Forth Bridge. The construction works are estimated to be completed by 2029, with the new trains running by 2031.

== Service provision ==
Initially upon opening, the service level was one train per hour between Leven and Edinburgh Waverley, calling at Cameron Bridge. As intended, Scotrail increased services to two trains per hour in 2025, with one train via Kirkcaldy and along the coast, and the other via Dunfermline along the inner Fife Circle Line.
