= Fife Coast Express =

Overview
- Service type: Passenger train
- First service: 1912
- Last service: 5 September 1959
- Former operators: NBR, LNER, BR

Route
- Termini: St Andrews and Crail; Glasgow Queen Street
- Service frequency: Daily

The Fife Coast Express, formerly the Fifeshire Coast Express, was a named passenger train operating in the United Kingdom.

== History ==
The summer service was started in 1910 by the North British Railway under the name Fifeshire Coast Express, as a Glasgow to Crail train at 4.20 p.m. on a Friday evening, returning at 6.17 a.m. on Monday morning. This enabled businessmen to house their families on the coast during the summer, and travel to stay with them at weekends. From the following summer it ran daily, Monday to Friday.

In 1924 it became known as the Fife Coast Express. The named train was withdrawn on the outbreak of the Second World War but was re-introduced for the summer of 1949.

It was withdrawn on 5 September 1959.
