= Windygates =

Coordinates: 56.192738°N 3.054414°W

Windygates: Scottish Gaelic: Geataichean Gaothaca
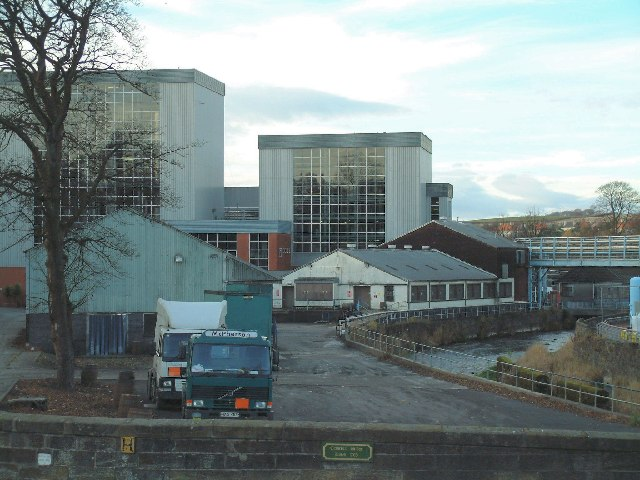
- Cameron Bridge distillery

- Location within Fife
- Population: 1,800 (2020)
- OS grid reference: NO 34670 511
- Community council: Windygates
- Council area: Fife
- Lieutenancy area: Fife
- Country: Scotland
- Sovereign state: United Kingdom
- Post town: LEVEN
- Postcode district: KY8
- Dialling code: 01333 (north of River Leven) & 01592 (south of River Leven)
- Police: Scotland
- Fire: Scottish
- Ambulance: Scottish

Windygates is a small village and surrounding district in central Fife, Scotland.

The district encompasses the following villages, farms and estates; Wellsgreen Farm, Little Lun Farm, Woodbank Farm, The Maw (a former mining community on the Standing Stane Road), Cameron Farm, Isabella (an abandoned mine), Smithyhill, Cameron Bridge, Bridgend, Durie Estate, Duniface Farm, Haughmill (a former weaving community), Drumcaldie, The Meetings (confluence of rivers Leven and Ore), Bankhead of Balcurvie Farm, Fernhill, Fernbank (both former farms), Balcurvie village (a former weaving community), Little Balcurvie (now known as the small holdings), Hawthorn Bank, Kennowayburns and Windygates village itself.

Housing demands of the 20th century brought all of these, almost forgotten identities, together into a district now commonly known as Windygates.

Windygates is off the A911, west of its sister village Milton of Balgonie, north of Kirkcaldy on the A915 and south of Kennoway on the A916.

The Windygates Hotel at the village cross was originally a coaching inn, and there were toll gates at the cross until the late 19th century, when the village grew to accommodate the nearby Cameron Bridge distillery.

== Famous residents ==
Historian Gordon Donaldson lived his final years in Windygates and died there.

Field Marshal Douglas Haig, 1st Earl Haig, who was born in a house on Charlotte Square in Edinburgh, had a family home in Windygates - Haig House - which was commissioned by his father in 1849. An infectious disease hospital was established within the grounds of the house in 1912, and the whole site would eventually join the National Health Service in 1948 as Cameron House.

== Sources ==
- Scottish Places
