= River Leven, Fife =

River in Fife, Scotland

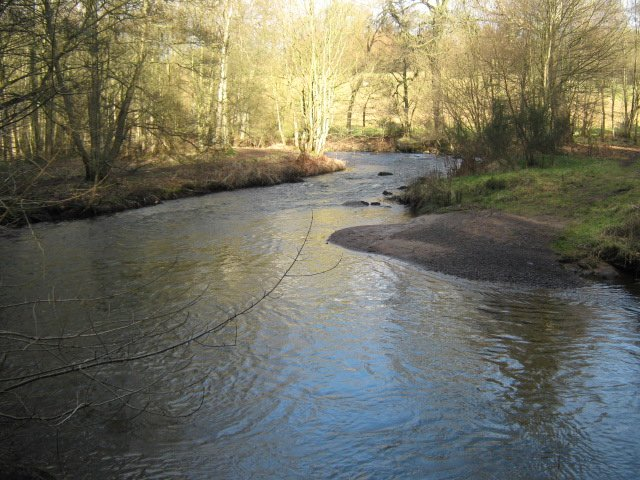
River Leven in Glenrothes

The River Leven (Scottish Gaelic: Lìobhann / Abhainn Lìobhann) is a river in Fife, Scotland. It flows from Loch Leven into the Firth of Forth at the town of Leven. The river is 47 km long and is home to brown trout and hosts a run of sea trout and atlantic salmon. The estuary has bass and mullet. The river has a number of barriers such as sluice gates, weirs and dams.

In previous centuries its water was used to power linen mills on its banks, particularly near Markinch, as well as three paper mills: Smith Anderson in Leslie, and Tullis Russell and John Dixon of Markinch. The river was heavily modified and had its water levels increased in the late 19th century to suit the growning industries of coal mining, paper mills and jute mills of the time.

The River Ore, Fife is a tributary of the River Leven, joining it at 56.190492°N 3.071665°W.
