= Fife Coast Railway =

Defunct railway line in Scottish county of Fife

Overview
- Locale: Scotland
- Dates of operation: 1887–1969

Technical
- Track gauge: 4 ft 8 1/2 in (1,435 mm)

The Fife Coast Railway was a railway line running round the southern and eastern part of the county of Fife, in Scotland. It was built in stages by four railway companies:

- the Leven Railway opened the section from a junction at Thornton on the Edinburgh and Northern Railway main line to Leven in 1854, serving textile mills and a distillery. In 1857 the company extended eastwards to Kilconquhar;
- the East of Fife Railway built the line from Leven to Kilconquhar, opening in 1857;
- the Leven and East of Fife Railway was created in 1861 by an amalgamation of the first two companies. It opened the line to Anstruther in 1863;
- finally the Anstruther and St Andrews Railway completed the line from Anstruther to St Andrews in 1887.

St Andrews itself had already been reached from Leuchars in 1852 by The St. Andrews Railway.

As well as the textile industries, the line served fishing and agriculture, and an important passenger traffic built up. The lines had been engineered by Thomas Bouch and some difficulties were experienced with inadequately specified technical equipment.

Coal exports assumed a huge importance in the last decades of the nineteenth century, and harbours at Leven and Methil were extended considerably.

The line thrived up until 1939, but road transport took its toll on both passenger and freight business, and the importance of coal declined, and the line closed to passengers in 1965 and to goods traffic in 1966.

== History ==
=== First railways ===
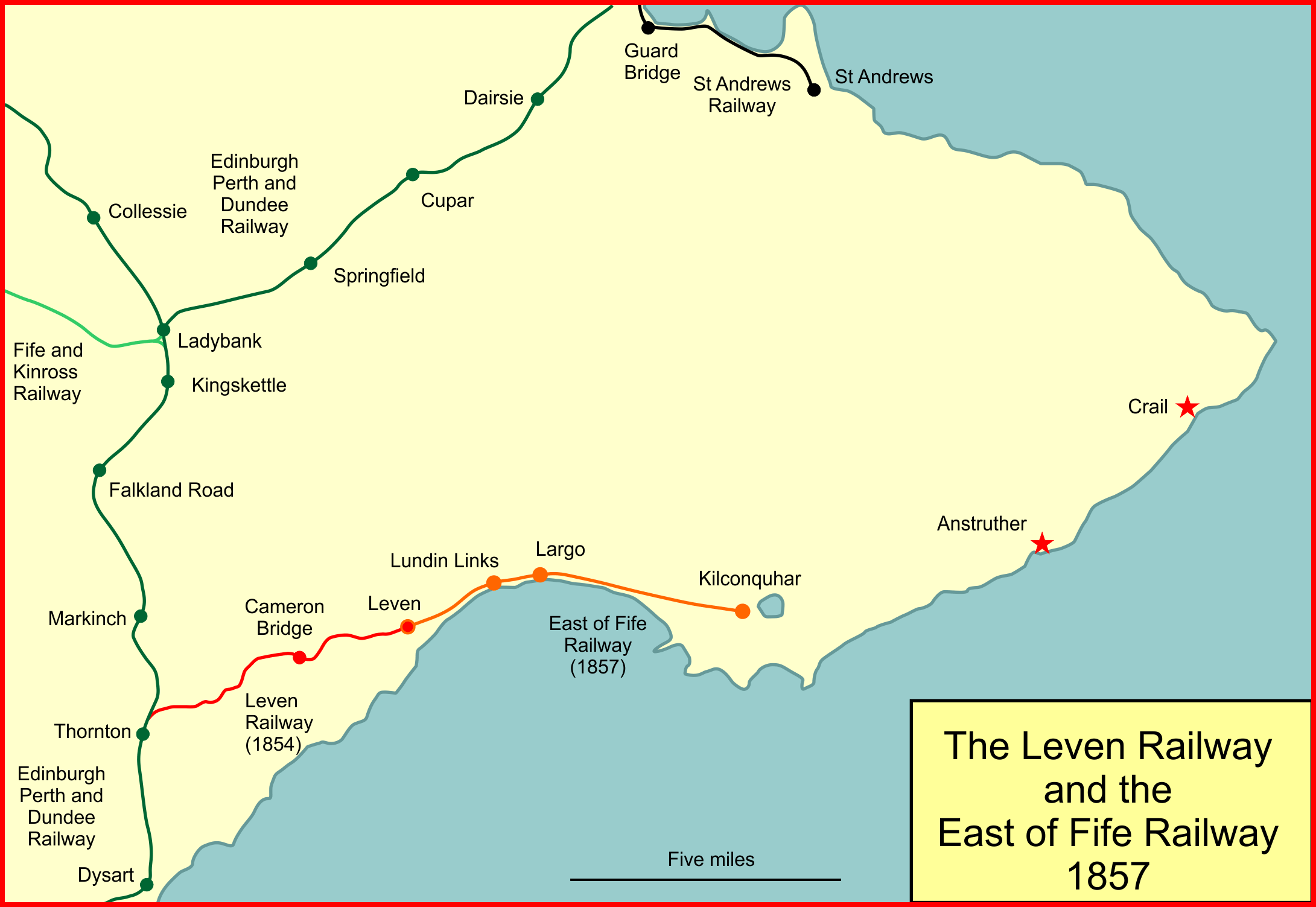
The Leven Railway and the East of Fife Railway in 1857

Following the success of the Edinburgh and Glasgow Railway, Scotland's first trunk railway, which opened in 1842, promoters started to think of ambitious schemes for other Scottish lines. The easy availability of money as the economy improved resulted in a frenzy of railway promotion and the 1845 Parliamentary session saw a huge number of authorisations. Among them was the Edinburgh and Northern Railway, which was planned to link Edinburgh and Dundee, with an arm to Perth. Bridging the Firths of Forth and Tay was not technologically feasible and ferry crossings at both ends were to be part of the journey, for passengers and for goods.

The Edinburgh and Northern soon changed its name to the Edinburgh, Perth and Dundee Railway and it opened its lines progressively in 1847–1848. The route ran through Kirkcaldy, Markinch and Ladybank, forking there for Ferryport-on-Craig via Leuchars, and Perth.

The original prospectus for the line had included a branch line from Leuchars to St Andrews, but this was dropped from the scheme as actually authorised, and it fell to local people in St Andrews to build their own branch line from Leuchars. They did so, and the St Andrews Railway opened in 1852.

Immediately following the authorisation of the Edinburgh and Northern Railway in 1845, a prospectus was issued for an East of Fife Railway. It would either leave the E&NR at Thornton and follow the valley of the River Leven, or leave it at Markinch and follow the valley of the River Orr (often spelt "Ore"). Either way, the line would pass through Cameron Bridge and run close to the coast as far as Anstruther, a distance of about twenty miles. The easy topography of the area was such that the line would be "free from tunnelling or embanking".

East of Fife Railway Act 1846
- Act of Parliament
- Parliament of the United Kingdom
- Long title: An Act for making a Railway from the Edinburgh and Northern Railway at Markinch to Anstruther Easter, with a Branch to the Kirkland Works, to be called "The East of Fife Railway."
- Citation: 9 & 10 Vict. c. cxc

Dates
- Royal assent: 16 July 1846

Other legislation
- Repealed by: East of Fife Railway Dissolution Act 1850

Status: Repealed

East of Fife Railway (Markinch Deviation) Act 1847
- Act of Parliament
- Parliament of the United Kingdom
- Long title: An Act to enable the East of Fife Railway Company to make a Deviation in their Main Line, and to improve the Junction with the Edinburgh and Northern Railway near Markinch.
- Citation: 10 & 11 Vict. c. ccxxiv

Dates
- Royal assent: 22 July 1847

Other legislation
- Repealed by: East of Fife Railway Dissolution Act 1850

Status: Repealed

East of Fife Railway Dissolution Act 1850
- Act of Parliament
- Parliament of the United Kingdom
- Long title: An Act for the Dissolution of the East of Fife Railway Company, and for the Abandonment of the Railway.
- Citation: 13 & 14 Vict. c. xcvii

Dates
- Royal assent: 14 August 1850

Other legislation
- Repeals/revokes: East of Fife Railway Act 1846; East of Fife Railway (Markinch Deviation) Act 1847

Text of statute as originally enacted

The capital of the company was to be £250,000, a huge amount for a simple branch line. Supported by prominent local persons, the scheme obtained its authorising act of Parliament, East of Fife Railway Act 1846 (9 & 10 Vict. c. cxc) on 16 July 1846, adopting the Markinch junction route. In 1844 and 1845 money for railway schemes had been easy to come by; now in 1846 the slump had set in and it was impossible to get subscriptions; nonetheless in 1847 the company obtained a further act, the East of Fife Railway (Markinch Deviation) Act 1847 (10 & 11 Vict. c. ccxxiv), modifying the route, but soon reality struck home, and in 1850 the company was dissolved by the East of Fife Railway Dissolution Act 1850 (13 & 14 Vict. c. xcvii).

=== The Leven Railway ===
==== Authorisation ====
In 1847 the Edinburgh and Northern Railway, now retitled the Edinburgh, Perth and Dundee Railway, had opened part of its main line, with a station at Markinch. In 1848 a station at Thornton was opened. This emphasised to the people of Leven the loss of the railway connection that the East of Fife had promised.

In October 1851 a prospectus for the Leven Railway Company was issued. A less ambitious scheme was contemplated, running six miles from Thornton to Leven as a single track line; by avoiding the purchase of rolling stock (by contracting with the EP&DR to work the line) the capital cost of the project could be kept to £25,000.

As the scheme took shape, Thomas Bouch was appointed as engineer to the company. He pursued a policy of building low cost branch lines, arguing that the heavy expense of over-engineered railways crippled their profitability from the outset. The board of directors had no previous railway experience and at first they followed Bouch's recommendations implicitly.

The company would have capital of £23,000 and the line would run from Thornton to Burnmill, on the north-west margin of Leven, with branches to Kirkland Mill and to Leven Harbour. Burn Mill was a flour mill at that edge of Leven; the location was apparently chosen to enable later extension to Anstruther. Kirkland Mill was a large textile mill south of the river Leven a mile west of Leven itself. There was a large distillery and textile mill at Cameron Bridge, and numerous mills at Leven, where the terminal was some way north-west of the town; the attraction was the flour mill named Burn Mill. (The line was later extended south to the harbour.)

Leven Railway Act 1852
- Act of Parliament
- Parliament of the United Kingdom
- Long title: An Act for making a Railway from the Edinburgh, Perth, and Dundee Railway at Thornton Junction Station to the Town of Leven, with Branches to Kirkland Works and to the Harbour of Leven.
- Citation: 15 & 16 Vict. c. xcv

Dates
- Royal assent: 17 June 1852

Text of statute as originally enacted

A bill went to Parliament, and notwithstanding fierce opposition from a local landowner, C. Maitland Christie, the Leven Railway Act 1852 (15 & 16 Vict. c. xcv) received royal assent on 17 June 1852.

The working arrangement with the EP&DR was revisited; it was to split any surplus income equally between the two companies, but the Leven Railway had to provide a locomotive.

==== Construction ====
In August land acquisition was high on the agenda, and the contractor went to Thornton to make the junction with the EP&DR there. This caused an immediate problem, for the Leven Railway had agreed that the EP&DR would be able to approve the plans for the junction in advance. It emerged that Bouch should have arranged this and had failed to do so; moreover despite urgent requests he had still not produced the plans in October.

During the construction there was exceptional hostility from landowners; the land was fertile and although in most cases payment had been made to acquire the land, handing over the land shortly before harvest time was against the owners' nature and many obstacles were put in the way of the railway.

The EP&DR was in serious financial difficulty as the Leven Railway took shape, and approached the Leven Company with a proposition: instead of the Leven Company providing a locomotive, they could give the money for it to the EP&DR, who would work the line with one of its own engines. This was obviously some kind of trick, and the Leven Company declined. The EP&DR took huge offence and tried to coerce the Leven Company, but Bouch obtained a Hawthorn 0-4-0 tender locomotive, Leven no. 1, and the EP&DR was obliged to comply with the agreement.

Captain Tyler of the Board of Trade inspected the line in early June; the Company was confident that the line would pass, but Tyler found a great number of shortcomings, and the anticipated opening had to be deferred. On 2 August 1854 he visited again and this time he approved it. There was a Directors' special run on the line on 5 August 1854, and it opened to the public on 10 August 1854. There were four passenger trains each way daily, connecting with main line trains at Thornton. The stations at Cameron Bridge and Leven were rudimentary, and the authorised branches to Kirkland and Leven Harbour were not yet started. (Note: Hajducki et al give 10 August 1854; Bruce gives 10 August 1854 as a "Gala Opening" (page 85); but on page 233 he says 3 July 1854; Quick, and Carter page 147, Thomas (NBR volume 1, page 166) and Thomas and Turnock, page 312, give the opening as 3 July 1854; but this was the date for which the Company first gave notice of intended opening to the Board of Trade; Hajducki et al explain the delay and persuasively give 10 August 1854 and explain why; pages 35 to 38. There was a "formal" opening for the Directors and dignitaries on 5 August (page 37, second paragraph) and the public opening on 10 August 1854 (page 39, second paragraph; actually a quotation of a Company announcement that the opening would take place on that day, but not challenged or modified by Hajducki. Hajducki then muddies the waters by quoting 7 August 1854 in the chronology on pages 313 and 314. Butt quotes 7 August 1854 but ascribes the opening to the Edinburgh, Perth and Dundee Railway. Corstorphine quotes 5 August, referring to the Directors' special run.)

==== First years of operation ====
There was soon serious difficulty with the locomotive in negotiating the curves, which appear to have been very sharp. At first the EP&DR declined to work the line with the locomotive, but agreed to do so at reduced speed while the Leven Company obtained a better locomotive. Bouch blamed all this on the locomotive, but when Bouch could not be contacted for some time, the Directors called in an independent engineer, Robert Nicholson, locomotive engineer of the EP&DR, to advise them. He found that there had been nothing wrong with the Hawthorn engine, but that Bouch's setting out of the line of route and the curves in the track were substantially at variance with the approved plans, and that the track was "substandard throughout". He was sent south to procure one from the Lancashire and Yorkshire Railway, which he did: a second-hand Bury 2-2-0. Leven no. 1 was sold to the Caledonian Railway.

The EP&DR continued to harbour hostile feelings towards the Leven Railway, and when a dispute over the terms of the working agreement could not be resolved, they gave notice that they would cease to work the line from 31 July 1854: about two weeks' notice. The Leven Railway had already overspent its authorised capital and could not simply acquire rolling stock and other plant as well as a replacement for the failing Bury locomotive. At the eleventh hour, General Lindsay of Balcarres funded the procurement of the necessary rolling stock, which was acquired remarkably quickly (from the Scottish Central Railway), and the line continued to run after the withdrawal of the EP&DR.

The traffic was very buoyant, almost double what had been foreseen, and having an efficient locomotive was essential. Unfortunately the Bury locomotive was also defective, and although it could hardly cope with the traffic, the Leven Company had to make the best of it while a new Hawthorn locomotive was built. The goods wagons also were extremely poor. The new locomotive arrived in October 1855 and immediately on arrival it too was found to be unready for work. It is not clear whether Bouch, as the Engineer of the line, was responsible for locomotive matters; but the Directors now found many deficiencies with the line itself, and wrote to Bouch in such strong terms that the letter was in effect dismissal.

In 1856 the finances of the company were buoyant; in the half year to 28 April 1856 the surplus was £1,204, nearly double that under the EP&DR working arrangement. In 1860 and 1861 the company was able to declare dividends of 8%.

Some time prior to 23 April 1858 the quarter-mile spur to the Kirkland Works, authorised in the original act of Parliament, was opened. (Note: Thomas and Turnock summarise this sequence, but erroneously refer to the Leven Railway as the West Fife Railway on pages 76 to 79. There was an unconnected West Fife Mineral Railway. The Leven Railway is correctly named in the index.)

=== The East of Fife Railway authorised and constructed ===
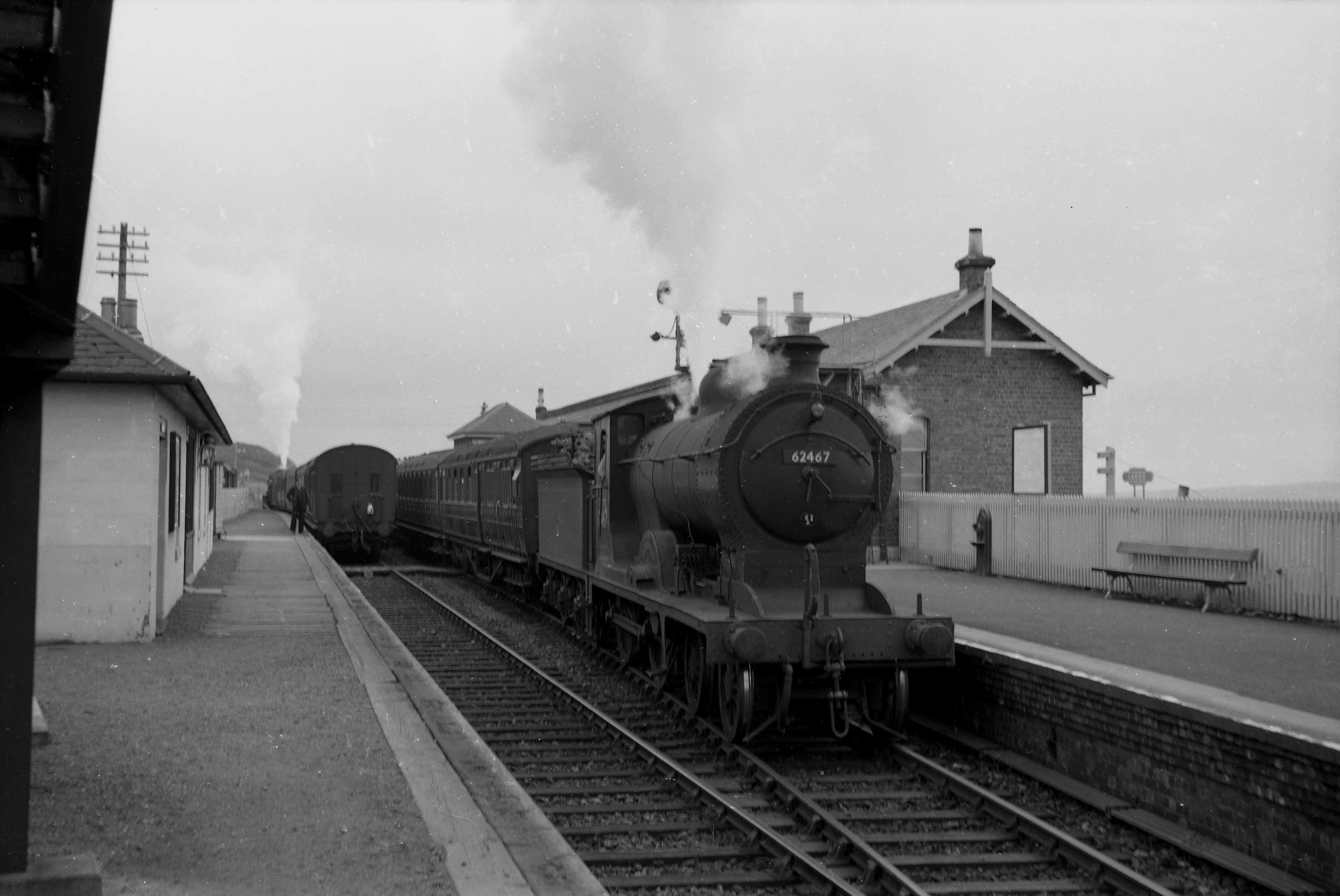
Glen Class D30 "Glenfinnan" leaving Largo on the Fife Coast Line on a railtour in 1958

In the middle of 1854 the Leven Railway was taking shape, and there was increasing demand for the settlements further east to be included in the railway network; many important fishing towns were located along the south-eastern coast of Fife. On 24 August 1854, just after the opening of the Leven line, a prospectus was issued for the East of Fife Railway. It was to run from the Leven Railway along the coastal strip to end at Anstruther and Cellardyke, a small community immediately east of Anstruther. Thomas Bouch had been engaged as engineer—his shortcomings on the Leven line had not yet become apparent—and he estimated £58,411 to build the line. There was considerable concern that the money to build the line would not be forthcoming in the community, and that the scheme might fail like the 1851 proposal. It was suggested building the line through Lower Largo and as far as Kilconquhar only at first; the insignificant village was a little inland and home only to a clay pit and a brickworks, and not obviously a destination in itself, and some opinions insisted on carrying the line throughout. But the Kilconquhar first stage prevailed, and the subscriptions were just about raised to get that far.

East of Fife Railway Act 1855
- Act of Parliament
- Parliament of the United Kingdom
- Long title: An Act for making a Railway from the Leven Railway at the Town of Leven, to the Town of Kilconquhar in the County of Fife, to be called "The East of Fife Railway."
- Citation: 18 & 19 Vict. c. clxv

Dates
- Royal assent: 23 July 1855

Text of statute as originally enacted

East of Fife Railway (Deviation) Act 1856
- Act of Parliament
- Parliament of the United Kingdom
- Long title: An Act to enable the East of Fife Railway Company to make a Deviation in the Line of their Railway, and for other Purposes.
- Citation: 19 & 20 Vict. c. xxiv

Dates
- Royal assent: 5 June 1856

Text of statute as originally enacted

A parliamentary bill was deposited, and although there was a last minute ambiguity about the exact location of the Kilconquhar terminus, the East of Fife Railway Act 1855 (18 & 19 Vict. c. clxv) obtained royal assent without difficulty on 23 July 1855, with capital of £32,000. A further act of 5 June 1856, the East of Fife Railway (Deviation) Act 1856 (19 & 20 Vict. c. xxiv) regularised the Kilconquhar location.

Intermediate stations were to be provided at Lundin Links (at the time completely undeveloped) and Lower Largo and the Kilconquhar terminus (to be called Kilconquhar and Elie). None of these was a large community, nor had they any great industrial activity.

The Board of the East of Fife line heard of the difficulties on the nearby Leven Railway, and had Bouch's work checked by an independent engineer. His report led the board to dismiss Bouch immediately, and Martin, one of Bouch's assistants, was brought in.

In September 1856 the Company wrote to Hawthorn's asking them to supply a locomotive identical to the one then running on the Leven line, and on 3 January 1857 the Directors were able to make a trial run from Leven to Drummochie (spelt Drummochy by some sources); the viaduct at Lower Largo was not yet ready for them to go further. This was successful and goods traffic started on 1 February 1857 as far as Drummochie, although the temporary goods station there was named Lundin Mill. Work on the viaduct and the route beyond proceeded well, and on 27 July 1857 Captain Tyler of the Board of Trade inspected it. Immediately north of Leven town a former waggon road (that is, tramway) crossed the line; it had connected a brickfield with the town. No signalling or other protection had been provided; moreover the Board of Trade had not been given the required certificate as to the method working the single line, and Tyler declined the approval to open to passengers.

These matters were quickly attended to: probably the waggon road crossing was removed, and the main line was to be worked under the "one engine in steam" principle. The necessary approval was given, and the directors made a demonstration run throughout the line on 30 July.

=== Opening to Kilconquhar ===
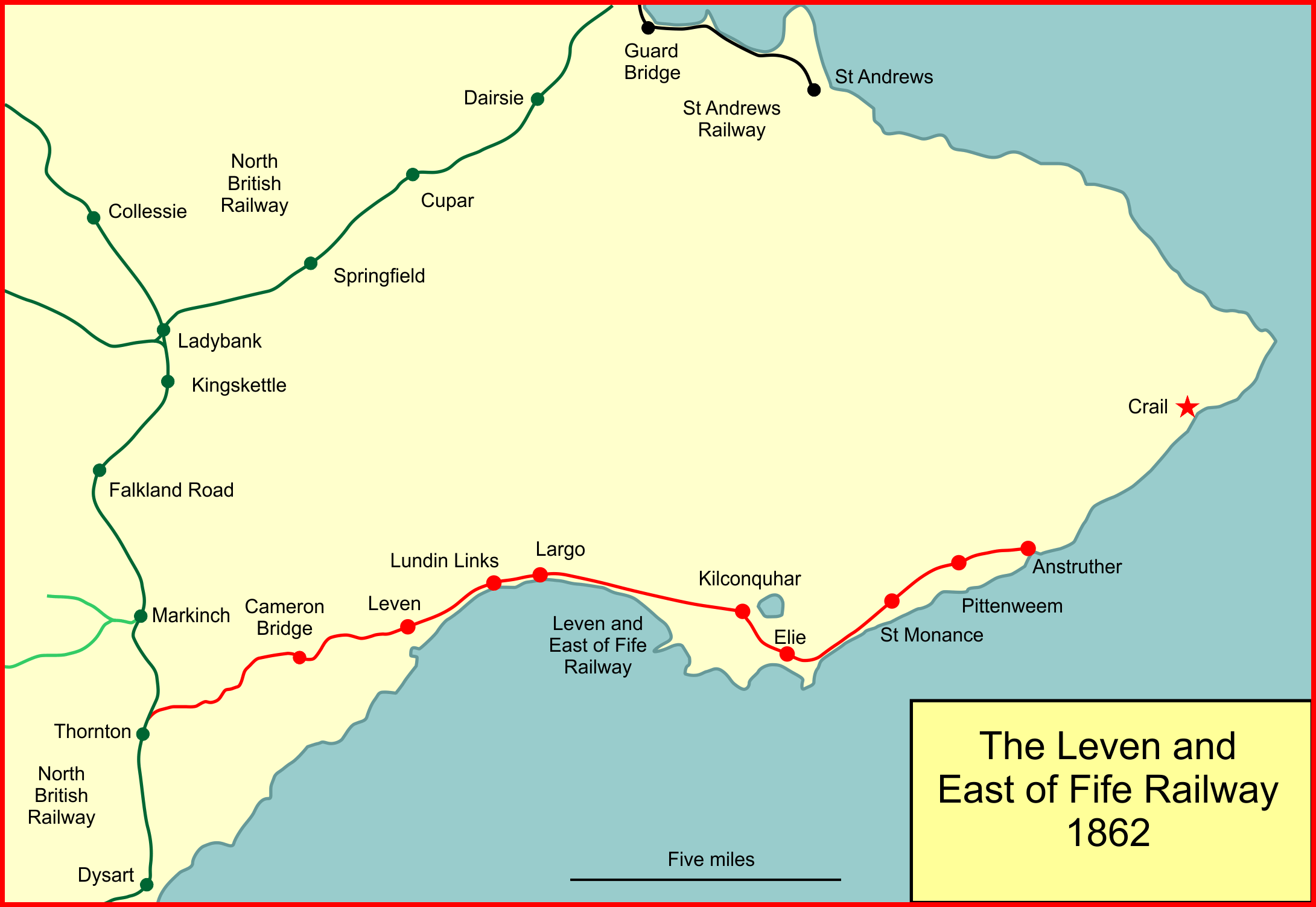
The Leven and East of Fife Railway in 1862

The line opened to the public on 11 August 1857 (Note: Hajducki et al say 11 May 1857, page 62, but from other adjacent dates, this must be a misprint for August. Carter says 18 August 1857; Thomas (NBR volume 1, page 166) and Thomas and Turnock say 8 July 1857, page 312.) There were four trains each way daily.

Ridership on the line exceeded expectations, amounting soon to over a thousand a week; by April 1858 the shareholders' meeting was informed that capital expenditure had been £36,606, and the operating surplus (probably for the half year) was £861. At 31 July 1860 the surplus for the half year was £626; the Leven surplus was £1,433. The East of Fife declared a dividend of 2% compared with the Leven's 8%.

=== The Leven and East of Fife Railway ===
Leven and East of Fife Railway Act 1861
- Act of Parliament
- Parliament of the United Kingdom
- Long title: An Act for the Amalgamation of the Leven and East of Fife Railway Companies.
- Citation: 24 & 25 Vict. c. clviii

Dates
- Royal assent: 22 July 1861

Leven and East of Fife Railway (Extension) Act 1861
- Act of Parliament
- Parliament of the United Kingdom
- Long title: An Act to enable the Leven and Fast of Fife Railway Companies to extend the East of Fife Railway to Anstruther.
- Citation: 24 & 25 Vict. c. clix

Dates
- Royal assent: 22 July 1861

This accentuated the feeling that terminating at Kilconquhar was not conducive to generating income, and the next stage onward to Anstruther was urgent. At the same time there was common ground that the two companies should be merged, although the detail of the arrangement was not without controversy. Parliamentary bills were to be submitted to authorise the extension to Anstruther and also the amalgamation of the two companies. On 22 July 1861, the Leven and East of Fife Railway Act 1861 (24 & 25 Vict. c. clviii) was passed, amalgamating the companies: there would be three classes of shares: Leven shares would benefit from two thirds of the income, and East of Fife shares one third; preference shares were to be issued to finance a number of debts. The Leven and East of Fife Railway (Extension) Act 1861 (24 & 25 Vict. c. clix) was also passed, authorising the line to Anstruther. A station at Pittenweem had been omitted from the original plans but was now inserted, and a loop line at Elie bringing the line closer to the town (Note: Apparently along the foreshore.) was deleted. £40,000 of further preference shares was authorised to pay for the new line.

On 13 August 1863 the Board of Trade inspector, Colonel Yolland, carried out his inspection of the line, and although most of the works were satisfactory, he was not satisfied with fencing and he found the permanent way to be rough, and wished a goods service to be operated for some time so as to consolidate the ballast. A goods service had started on 14 August, and Yolland being satisfied, a passenger service started on 1 September 1863. There were stations at Elie, St Monance, (Note: Nowadays spelt St Monan's.) Pittenweem and Anstruther; there were three mixed (passenger and goods) trains each way daily, from Thornton to Anstruther. The Kilconquhar station was converted to a through station, as earlier envisaged, and the Anstruther station was in Anstruther Wester.

A third locomotive was obtained after the opening to Anstruther and a five trains a day were run in summer, one being goods only. Traffic was much better than expected and more rolling stock had to be acquired. Fish was an exceptionally heavy traffic at Anstruther, and it often happened that a large number of landings took place at one, overwhelming the railway's capacity to cart the fish to market.

==== Muiredge branch ====
Leven and East of Fife Railway Act 1866
- Act of Parliament
- Parliament of the United Kingdom
- Long title: An Act for authorizing the Leven and East of Fife Railway Company to make and maintain certain Branches in the Parishes of Markinch and Wemyss in the County of Fife; and for other Purposes.
- Citation: 29 & 30 Vict. c. clxvii

Dates
- Royal assent: 16 July 1866

Text of statute as originally enacted

There was a colliery at Muiredge, immediately north of Buckhaven. It had earlier been worked by the Wemyss Estate but that had been given up. A new mineral company, Bowman and Cairns took a lease to develop the mine, and requested a railway connection. This short branch was provided, running south from the east end of Cameron Bridge station, (Note: Hajducki et al state the west end, apparently quoting the act of Parliament itself, but this is a mistake. In their book The Anstruther and St Andrews Railway, they describe this as The Wemyss Branch.) authorised by the Leven and East of Fife Railway Act 1866 (29 & 30 Vict. c. clxvii) of 16 July 1866. A public goods station was to be provided at Muiredge in addition, and a branch a mile and a half long to serve Methil docks, although this latter was never built. The Muiredge branch was steeply graded, and opened at the end of 1868. The public goods depot was named Muiredge Sidings Goods at first, but then Buckhaven from June 1878 and from 5 May 1887 Buckhaven (Old). Several additional colliery sidings were later made to the branch, although the Muiredge colliery itself installed a tramway direct to Methil Harbour and used that, horse-drawn at first, to ship the coal out direct.

=== Renewals ===
In the years from 1868, Bouch's original (and cheap) timber bridges were becoming unserviceable. Several were replaced with iron bridges, and much of his early wrought iron rail was replaced with steel rail. A fourth locomotive was obtained in 1870 and a fifth in 1872.

=== Leven Harbour ===
Leven Harbour Act 1876
- Act of Parliament
- Parliament of the United Kingdom
- Long title: An Act for the Improvement of the Harbour of Leven, and to authorise the Construction of a Wet Dock and other Works; and for other purposes.
- Citation: 39 & 40 Vict. c. clxxiii

Dates
- Royal assent: 24 July 1876

The Leven Railway's original act of Parliament, the Leven and East of Fife Railway Act 1861, had authorised a branch to Leven Harbour, but this had never been constructed. At this period coal extraction in the area grew considerably, and the Leven Harbour Dock and Railway Company was established to improve the docks at Leven and to arrange a railway connection. It got an authorising act of Parliament, the Leven Harbour Act 1876 (39 & 40 Vict. c. clxxiii) on 24 July 1876. The capital was £25,000, and the railway part of the works extended to just over half a mile. The North British Railway, intending to take over the line, contributed £5,000 to the scheme. On 18 November 1879 the first vessel used the harbour; the branch railway was to be treated as a siding branch of the NBR with receipts for traffic on it divided between the NBR and the Dock and Railway company. The Leven Harbour never realised its potential, chiefly due to difficulty with silting, and the availability of alternative docks.

=== Absorbed by the North British Railway ===
Although the Leven and East of Fife Railway was profitable on revenue account, it was vulnerable to a number of external factors. Nearly all its traffic was through to or from the North British Railway at Thornton. (The North British had taken over the Edinburgh Perth and Dundee Railway in 1862.) The trade cycle had diminished the company's income, and its lack of capital reserves made it difficult to consider expanding the network. Amalgamation with the North British Railway was obviously imminent. This was in fact agreed, and on 28 June 1877 the North British Railway (Amalgamations) Act 1877 (40 & 41 Vict. c. lxi) was passed; the agreed date for the actual amalgamation was 1 August 1877. A final dividend of 10.5% for Leven stock and 5% for East of Fife stock was declared. (The St Andrews Railway was amalgamated with the NBR on the same day.)

=== The Anstruther and St Andrews Railway authorised ===
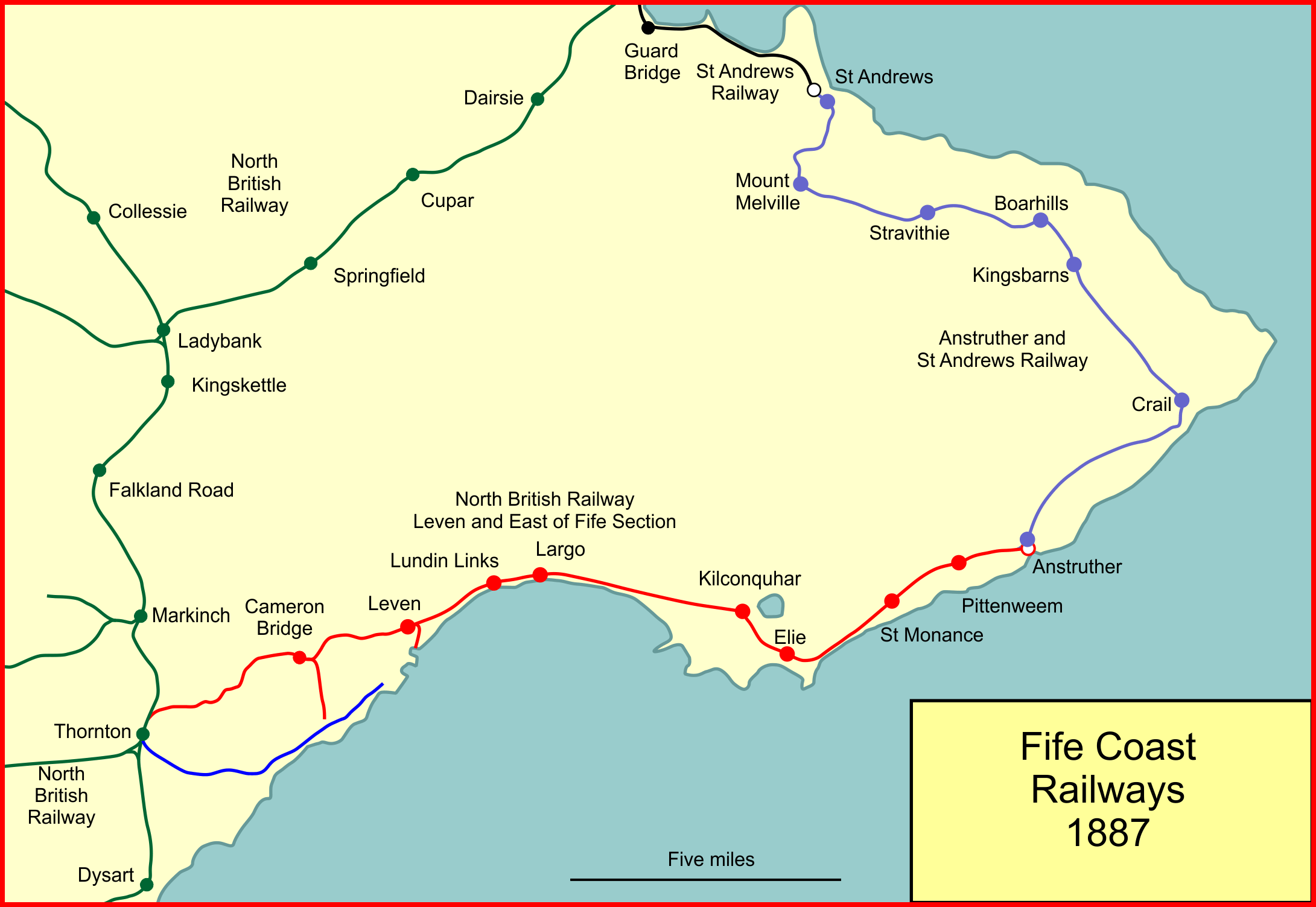
Fife Coast railways in 1887

Anstruther had been reached by a railway in 1863, and St Andrews, 8 miles away, had been on the railway system since 1852: but the short gap in the railway network between the two important towns, with fertile agricultural land in between, demanded a connecting link. In February 1864 this was proposed in the press, and a survey was carried out. In September 1864 a prospectus was issued, but there were mixed feelings locally about the profitability of the line, and after several meetings, it was announced in December 1866 that the scheme would be deferred for the time being. A further unsuccessful attempt to get a proposal activated took place in 1874, and in 1877 there was what seemed to be a better outcome, when on 24 August 1877 a meeting at Crail attracted considerable support, including subscriptions for shares. Yet in August 1878 it was announced that "the prospect of the line being shortly proceeded with is now bright", implying that not enough subscriptions had been taken

By this time (actually in 1877) the North British Railway had taken over both the St Andrews Railway (from Leuchars) and the Leven and East of Fife Railway.

Anstruther and St. Andrews Railway Act 1880
- Act of Parliament
- Parliament of the United Kingdom
- Long title: An Act for making a Railway from Anstruther to Saint Andrews, in the county of Fife; and for other purposes.
- Citation: 43 & 44 Vict. c. clxxx

Dates
- Royal assent: 26 August 1880

Text of statute as originally enacted

In February 1880 after a considerable controversy over the route of the line, and particularly the location of the St Andrews station and whether the line should link up with the St Andrews Railway there, the matter seemed to be settled. A working agreement with the North British Railway was negotiated (giving them 50% of gross receipts), and the matter went to Parliament. The Anstruther and St Andrews Railway was authorised by act of Parliament, the Anstruther and St. Andrews Railway Act 1880 (43 & 44 Vict. c. clxxx) on 26 August 1880. The share capital was to be £57,000; a new through station was required at Anstruther, and there would be a terminus at St Andrews in the Argyle district.

A contract was let on 7 January 1881 to John Coghill and Sons in the amount of £37,698 exclusive of permanent way, a lower price than expected. At first the works proceeded as expected, but the following year it was obvious that Coghill and Sons had over-reached themselves and were bankrupt in August 1882. The Company resolved to continue the works themselves.

Anstruther and St. Andrews Railway Act 1883
- Act of Parliament
- Parliament of the United Kingdom
- Long title: An Act to authorise the Anstruther and Saint Andrews Railway Company to construct an extension of their authorised Railway to join the Saint Andrews Branch Railway of the North British Railway; and for other purposes.
- Citation: 46 & 47 Vict. c. c

Dates
- Royal assent: 16 July 1883

In November 1882 it was announced that a railway connecting the Anstruther line and the St Andrews Railway at St Andrews was to be built. The North British Railway was to fund the work, which would include providing a new through station, and it would get free use of the new joint station. This was authorised by the Anstruther and St. Andrews Railway Act 1883 (46 & 47 Vict. c. c) on 16 July 1883.

=== Opening: from Anstruther to Boarhill at first ===
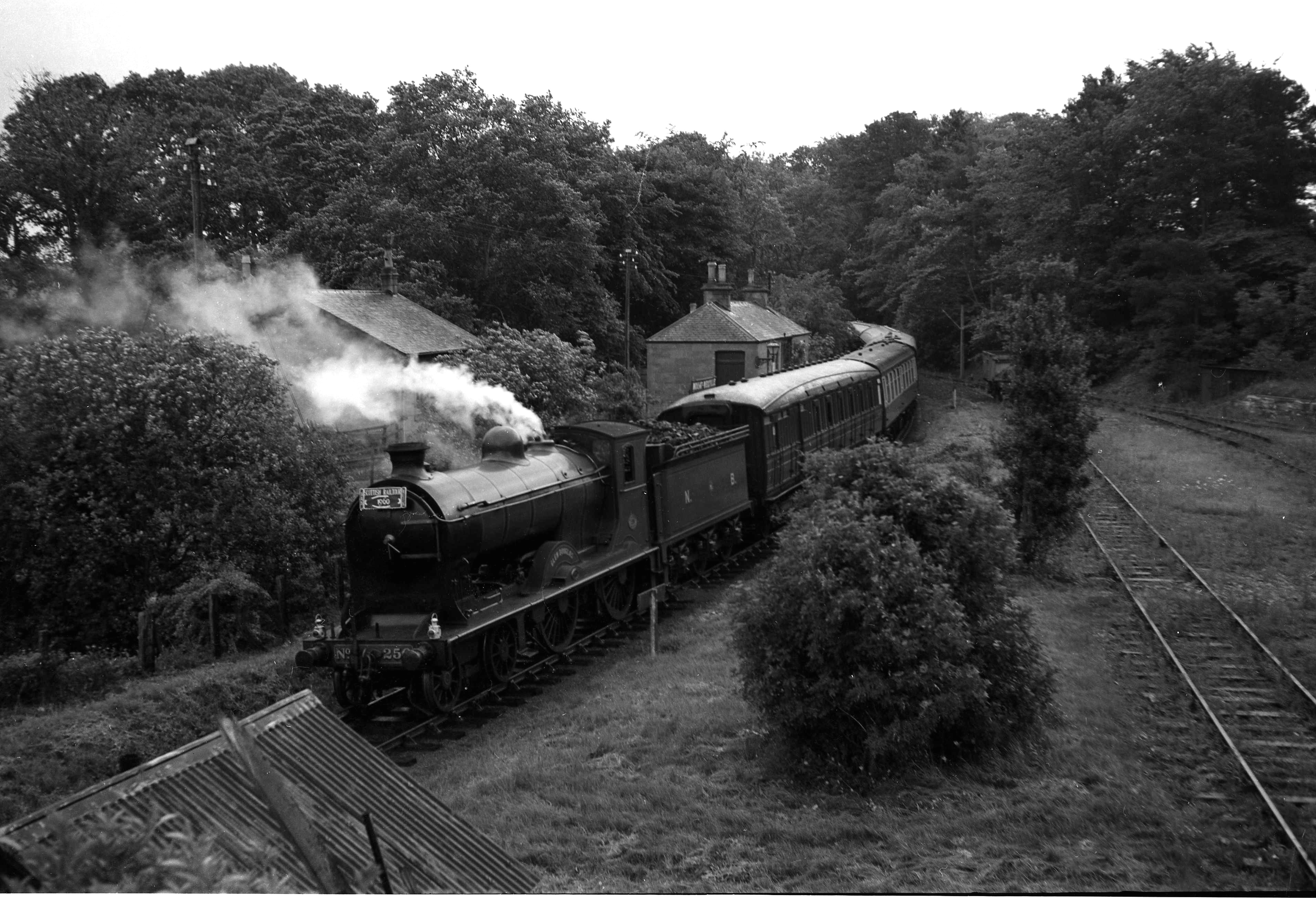
Glen Class D 30 "Glen Douglas" at Mount Melville with a railtour in 1960

A rudimentary goods train service had already been started, on 1 May 1883, between Anstruther and Crail, following pressure from local farmers. The line as far as Boarhills was pressed forward and in August 1883 Major Marindin of the Board of Trade inspected the line. Marindin gave a positive report, although some details required to be resolved; in particular it was intended to detach coaches at Anstruther off trains for Boarhills, and there was no accommodation to do so at the new Anstruther station. (The old Anstruther station would be on a spur from the new line, and was to become a goods station.)

The line was single with a passing loop at Kingsbarns (although for the time being the line was to be worked on the one-engine-in-steam principle). Stations were at Anstruther, Crail, Kingsbarns and Boarhills. The steepest gradient was 1 in 60. Accordingly, the line opened for passenger traffic as far as Boarhills on 1 September 1883.

There were five passenger trains daily except Sundays, and they ran from Pittenweem on the Leven and East of Fife line to Boarhills, calling at Anstruther new station on the way. The coaches of the trains ran through from Leven and were detached at Pittenweem, the Leven train continuing to Anstruther old station. The arrangement worked in reverse in the other direction, being necessitated by the absence of a loop of other track connections at Anstruther on the St Andrews line. In fact, as required by Major Marindin, a loop there was constructed, and was operational at the end of December 1883. The Leven passenger trains diverted there from then onwards and the East of Fife station at Anstruther became a goods station only. The first train of the day was mixed, passenger and goods. There were three road coach journeys daily connecting Boarhills and St Andrews.

=== The Wemyss Estate ===
Leven Harbour had been declining due to silting, and in 1883 the Wemyss Estates (Randolph Wemyss, his tenant colliers and certain other business interests) acquired the Leven Harbour Company for £15,000, on 15 August 1883. This knock-down price for a useless harbour included the short branch line. Coal production in the area was expanding enormously, and Wemyss clearly foresaw that modern harbour facilities were appropriate to handle it. He enlarged the dock at Methil, a short distance westward on the coast: it opened on 5 May 1887. Wemyss arranged for storage sidings there (Note: To hold loaded coal wagons prior to bulk transfer to a ship.) and for the Leven Connection Railway to be built, from the NBR Leven Dock Branch to Methil; it was two miles long and crossed the River Leven on a three-span girder bridge. It opened on 17 September 1887, and traffic at Leven Dock collapsed immediately. The North British Railway felt seriously aggrieved at the disadvantage that they experienced, but Wemyss sold the Methil Dock and the connecting railways back to the NBR for £225,000 on 1 November 1889.

Dissatisfaction with the efficiency of the dock arrangements was a continuing issue, and in 1893 the coal owners were pressuring the NBR to improve matters. Wemyss complained that the Methil no. 2 Dock scheme was halted. Wemyss threatened that if the NBR did not act, he would create a new dock himself and divert the railway traffic away from the NBR branch.

In 1896 the North British Railway made an agreement with Wemyss and 27 other coal owners: for 21 years they would not support rival railway proposals nor build one themselves. Wemyss had a seat on the NBR board as a result of the 1889 sale, but in 1897 he announced that he was to build a line of his own to Methil. This was in contravention of the agreement, and of course would be in competition with the NBR of which he was a Director. There followed an unseemly public spat on the Board, which took some considerable time to smooth over, and brought the NBR into disrepute.

=== Completing from Boarhills to St Andrews ===
Although the intention of the Anstruther and St Andrews Company had been to press on from Boarhills to St Andrews without delay, the Directors now discovered that nearly all the capital had been expended, and there was no possibility of continuing. This was serious, for Boarhills was no destination in itself, and indeed the first three months of operation had resulted in a loss. The Company appealed to the North British Railway for assistance, which the NBR gave, and they agreed to extend the working arrangement too. The Anstruther and St Andrews Company also issued preference shares and managed to generate some more capital. This took some time, but in November 1885 a contract was awarded to James Young & Company for construction of the line on to St Andrews.

By now it was confirmed that the NBR would fund the connection from the location at St Andrews where the Anstruther line was earlier planned to terminate, on to the junction with the Leuchars line just west of the earlier St Andrews station, in the amount of £5,000. The NBR was to work the line for 50% of gross receipts.

The work went ahead and on 28 May 1887 Major General Hutchinson of the Board of Trade visited the line to inspect it. Hutchinson reported a number of improvements that he required, but he recommended approval for passenger operation. The line was signalled and worked on the train staff and ticket system, and the Anstruther to Boarhills section, previously operated as one engine in steam, was to be converted also to the train staff and ticket system. (Hutchinson recommended that the Leuchars to St Andrews section should also be converted to this system.) Gradients on this section were steep, the most extreme being 1 in 49.5, and Hutchinson was concerned about steep gradients at siding connections, where there was a risk of vehicles being left on the main line on the gradient during shunting operations, and by some mishap running away.

Stations were at Stravithie (spelt Stravithy in Hutchinson's report), Mount Melville, and St Andrews New Station. Hutchinson recommended that the section between the two St Andrews stations should be made double track. (This was never done.)

The line opened on 1 June 1887. (Note: In Hajducki et al, The St Andrews Railway, the date is erroneously given as 1 July; this is corrected in the same authors' book, The Leven and East of Fife Railway in a footnote on page 100.) The new St Andrews station had an island platform and a passing loop, but being in a deep cutting, if had no other trackage. Goods facilities were provided at the old St Andrews Railway station, now renamed St Andrews Links (or sometimes St Andrews Old), while the new station was named St Andrews (New). The two stations were 616 yards apart.

In the decade from 1880 the habit of holidaying at seaside resorts had been increasing markedly, but it was not until the Anstruther line was completed to St Andrews that this affected railway travel in the area, due to the relatively limited scope of the former railway network.

=== Accident at Anstruther New station ===
On 12 December 1896 a collision took place at Anstruther. The station still had only one platform, although a passing loop had been provided following Major General Hutchinson's requirements, but this was a goods loop only, without a platform and without proper locking on the points. An arriving train was signalled into the platform line where a train was standing, instead of into the loop. There were eleven injuries, but the collision drew attention to the chaotic technical arrangements on the line.

In fact nothing was done, and it was not until 1900, following a question asked in the House of Commons, that the NBR, by then the owner of the line, were induced to respond and provide the second platform and lengthen the existing one, and provide better access.

=== The end of independence ===
The Anstruther and St Andrews Railway had never made significant profits, and had paid dividends generally of 1%, while never paying off the deficit on capital account amounting to £5,000. The NBR considered acquiring the company, at first by purchase of shares, although these retained a high price, exactly because shareholders believed that eventually the NBR would have to acquire them at par. The NBR wanted to acquire the line in order to make improvements to it, which the independent Anstruther company could not afford.

The issue dragged on, but in early 1897 agreement was reached, and on 15 July 1897 the North British Railway (General Powers) Act 1897 (60 & 61 Vict. c. cxxvii) was passed, approving the absorption, which was to be effective from 1 August 1897. The Anstruther and St Andrews ordinary shareholders received about 33% of their paid up value in cash.

The NBR lost little time in planning improvements. The whole line had a single passing place, at Kingsbarns, and there was no passing place at Crail, for long a sore point for this important resort. The NBR decided to provide one and a second platform, and a siding there, and to convert the signalling to tablet working instead of the obsolete train staff and ticket system. The new arrangements were implemented on 7 May 1898. A passing loop and second platform were also provided at Stravithie at this time.

=== The twentieth century ===
On 3 July 1901 there was a serious fire at St Andrews (New) station. A few weeks previously the Links station had been burned down, and the two events were assumed to be the work of an arsonist. Most of the New station buildings were destroyed, and the Burgh urged the NBR to provide enhanced accommodation in the rebuilding. However the NBR's costings indicated that this would be unaffordable, and they replaced the station buildings broadly as before.

Holiday traffic was exceedingly heavy in the summer, with seemingly every loop and siding occupied by a passenger train on the busiest days, and working the single line sections proved difficult. In 1907 the NBR established a new passing place named Kilconquhar West, about a mile west of the station, and not close to any other habitation. Otherwise, in the face of constant criticism in the press, the NBR confined itself to minor improvements at stations for the time being.

The mineral traffic at Methil was building up considerably as well, and delays to that also led to complaints. On 2 August 1907 the NBR got an act of Parliament, the North British Railway Act 1907 (7 Edw. 7. c. ciii). to build a new, much larger, no. 3 dock at Methil to the east of the former docks, and to provide a new branch line parallel to the earlier Dock branch; the Buckhaven connection had severe gradients and was no longer a suitable route to handle the very heavy traffic. The line between Thornton and Leven was to be doubled, and a large marshalling yard provided near the junction on the main line at Leven. The new railway works were commissioned on 19 June 1910. The no. 3 Dock was constructed between 1908 and 1913. This was coupled with an attempt to close Leven Docks, which were subject to heavy silting; this had been attempted in 1900 but rebuffed. The NBR spent £1,387,000 on Methil and Leven between 1889 and 1913.

These arrangements enabled the NBR to operate a weekend summer train in 1910, the Fifeshire Coast Express, from Glasgow to Crail on Friday evening, returning on Monday morning. This enabled business people to locate their families on the coast in the summer, and to travel there themselves at the weekend. The train was a success and ran from Mondays to Fridays in subsequent summers.

During World War I traffic on the line was depressed as holidays in the area were discouraged, and menfolk were away at the front. Mount Melville and Boarhills stations were closed to passengers and goods from 1 January 1917, until 1919. (The two stations handled less than 25 passengers per week between them at the time: Boarhills had once been the terminus of the line!)

A Royal Naval Air Station was proposed in 1916 to be located at Crail. The workers and the materials for the construction brought considerable extra traffic to the line; the aerodrome was opened in July 1918 as a Royal Air Force station.

After the armistice, the express trains from Glasgow and now Edinburgh were re-introduced (now called The Fife Coast Express).

In 1923 the main line railways of Great Britain were "grouped" under the Railways Act 1921; the North British Railway was a constituent of the new London and North Eastern Railway (LNER) from the beginning of 1923.

In 1923 also bus services started in earnest in the locality. The Anstruther line was meandering and its stations were mostly remote from their communities, and trains were infrequent compared with the bus offerings. Motor lorries too showed their superiority in door to door transits over the railways. The decline in income was serious and in 1929 the LNER announced the closure of Kingsbarns, Boarhills, Stravithie and Mount Melville stations to passengers; this took effect on 22 September 1929.

During World War II three airfields were opened near the line: at Crail, the earlier aerodrome was reopened, and new fields at Stravithie and Dunino (near Kingsbarns) were set up, once again involving considerable construction traffic.

At the end of the war, the Fife Coast Express was reinstated between Crail and Glasgow; it used the former Silver Jubilee streamlined stock displaced from the East Coast Main Line, but without refreshment facilities. It ran until 5 September 1959.

In 1948 the railways of Great Britain were nationalised, and the lines in the area now formed part of British Railways, Scottish Region. The future of the line was already plain to see, as both passenger and goods carryings continued the pre-war decline, as road services were discovered to be more convenient and cheaper.

=== Decline and closure ===
In 1959 the first diesel multiple units appeared on some trains, and in April 1960 they took over most of the passenger operation in the area. The decline of local goods services accelerated and on 5 October 1964 most local goods stations were closed, and on 6 September 1965 the entire line between Leven and St Andrews closed to passenger trains; the section from St Andrews to Crail closed completely. The residual goods service at Crail could not survive on its own, and from 18 December 1966 the entire line from Leven was closed.

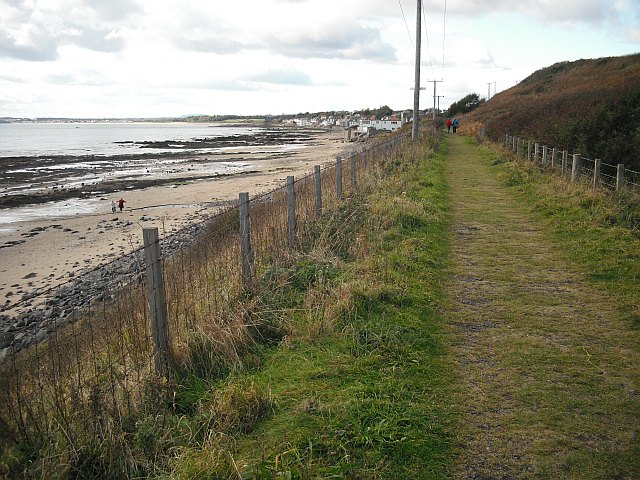
Dismantled railway near Largo. Now part of the Fife Coast path

Parts of the line have been used for the Fife Coastal Path, a popular walking route. There is no railway use on the former line at present.

The Leven to Thornton section continued and through passenger trains ran to Edinburgh, and at first it seemed that this could continue; but passenger business on those trains too was small and a huge loss was incurred in running the trains; the line between Thornton and Leven closed to passengers on 6 October 1969.

Rationalisation of the remaining freight facilities on the Leven section followed progressively over the succeeding years, and by 1980 the only residual traffic was to Methil power station, grain to Cameron Bridge and a public coal siding at Leven Dock. In 1999 all these traffics had disappeared.

=== Reopening of the Leven to Thornton section ===
The first mile of line between Thornton North Junction and Earlseat opencast mine reopened and operated with around two trains a week serving the Earlseat coal terminal from 2012–15. Several detailed transport studies conducted by consultants were undertaken between 2008-2019 demonstrating a favourable case for the reinstatement of both passenger and freight on the mothballed line, still fully intact and owned by Network Rail. Levenmouth, with a population of 37,500, is now by far the largest urban area in Scotland not served by a direct rail link.

In 2014 another campaign was started by the local community to reinstate the section of line between Leven and Thornton. This culminated in an announcement by Michael Matheson, the Cabinet Secretary for Transport in the Scottish Government, that the line would be reinstated at a cost of £70,000,000. The Levenmouth Rail Campaign had succeeded as a result of full community involvement including a 12,500 signature petition to the Scottish Parliament. The line is planned to reopen in 2024 and will offer a direct train service between Leven and Edinburgh, thus creating opportunities for employment, leisure and tourism.

It was announced on 18 September 2020 that Network Rail is to begin vegetation clearance, site surveys and geological investigations to inform the development of plans to reopen the Levenmouth line, with stations at Cameron Bridge and Leven. ‘Although still at a very early stage, it is fantastic to see work happening literally preparing the ground and to inform the design of the line’, said Graeme Stewart of NR’s Levenmouth project team on 15 September. ’We have been working on developing a range of options which will define what the project looks like and how it is delivered.’

== Topography ==
From Thornton the line fell with a ruling gradient of 1 in 100 to Leven; from there slight undulations followed leading to a minor summit at Largo, approached from each direction at 1 in 115. There was a further climb to Kilconquhar West at 1 in 223, then falling gently until a short descent at 1 in 100 to Elie. Further undulations followed, with the steeper gradients only running for short distances, finishing by falling at 1 in 176 to Anstruther.

From Anstruther the line climbed at 1 in 60 and after a level section fell at 1 in 120, climbing again at 1 in 89 through Crail. Similar gradients brought the line down to Kingsbarns, and after a gentle section to Boarhills the line climbed at 1 in 50 to Stravithie, then falling at 1 in 50 almost continuously to St Andrews.

Locations on the line were:

=== Leven Railway ===
- Thornton; junction station on Edinburgh Perth and Dundee Railway;
- Cameron Bridge; opened 10 August 1854; closed 6 October 1969;
- Burnmill; temporary terminus opened 3 July 1854; replaced by permanent Leven station 11 August 1857;
- Leven; opened 11 August 1857; closed 6 October 1969.

=== East of Fife Railway ===
- Leven; above;
- Lundin Links; opened 11 August 1857; closed 6 September 1965;
- Largo; opened 11 August 1857; closed 6 September 1965;
- Kilconquhar; opened 11 August 1857; closed 6 September 1965.

=== Leven and East of Fife Railway ===
- Kilconquhar; above;
- Elie; opened 1 September 1863; (Note: Hajducki et al have 9 January 1863, page 313, but this is probably a misprint.) closed 6 September 1965;
- St Monance; opened 1 September 1863; soon renamed St Monan's October 1865; renamed St Monance February 1936; closed 6 September 1965;
- Pittenweem; opened 1 September 1863; closed 1 January 1917; re-opened 1 February 1919; closed 6 September 1965;
- Anstruther Junction; divergence of Anstruther and St Andrews Railway;
- Anstruther; opened 1 September 1863; closed (reduced to goods station) 27 December 1883.

=== Anstruther and St Andrews Railway ===
- Anstruther Junction; above;
- Anstruther (New); opened 1 September 1883; renamed Anstruther for Cellardyke 31 December 1883; closed 6 September 1965;
- Crail; opened 1 September 1883; closed 6 September 1965;
- Kingsbarns; opened 1 September 1883; closed 22 September 1930;
- Boarhills; opened 1 September 1883; closed 1 January 1917; re-opened 1 February 1919; closed 22 September 1930;
- Stravithie; opened 1 June 1887; closed 22 September 1930;
- Mount Melville; opened 1 June 1887 closed 1 January 1917; re-opened 1 February 1919; closed 22 September 1930;
- St Andrews; opened
- St Andrews (Links); former passenger terminal of the St Andrews Railway.
