= Thornton Junction railway station =

Disused railway station in Thornton, Fife

Thornton Junction
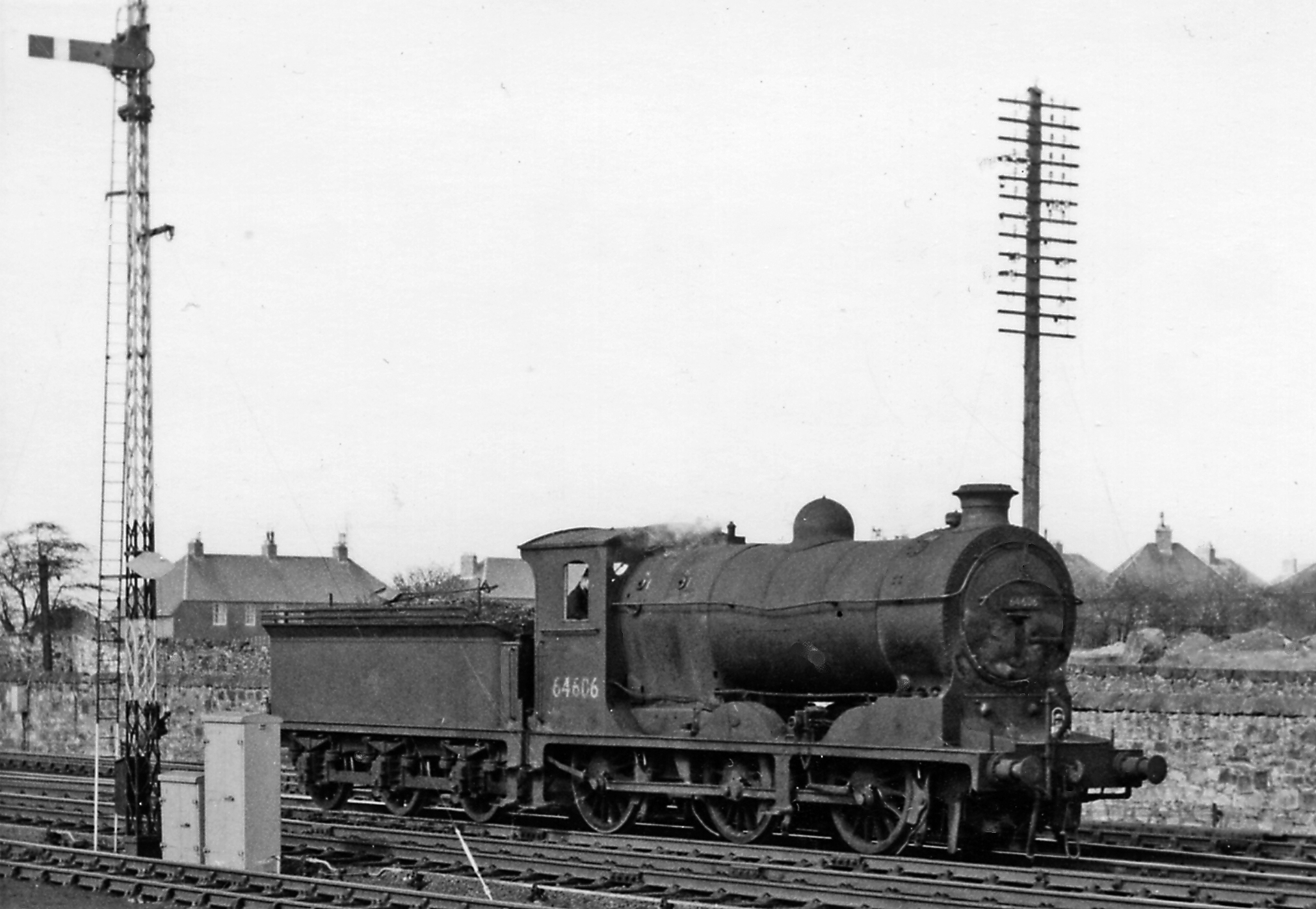
- The station in 1966

General information
- Location: Thornton, Fife; Scotland
- Coordinates: 56.1667°N 3.1296°W
- Grid reference: NT299976
- Platforms: 2

Other information
- Status: Disused

History
- Original company: Edinburgh and Northern Railway
- Pre-grouping: North British Railway
- Post-grouping: London and North Eastern Railway

Key dates
- 17 September 1847: Opened as Thornton
- 1 July 1923: Name changed to Thornton Junction
- 6 October 1969: Closed
Location

Thornton Junction railway station served the village of Thornton, Fife, Scotland from 1847 to 1969 on the Fife Coast Railway.

== History ==
The station opened on 17 September 1847 as Thornton by the Edinburgh and Northern Railway. It was situated north of the triangle junction. The name was changed to Thornton Junction by the LNER on 1 July 1923. It was a major interchange point between the lines to Edinburgh via Kirkcaldy or Dunfermline, Dundee and Perth, and Leven and the Fife Coast, and had a large island platform with bays at either end. However, it suffered badly from mining subsidence and had to be completely rebuilt three times during its lifespan. The station closed to both passengers and goods traffic on 6 October 1969. All trace of it has now disappeared due to extensive local track remodelling.

Preceding station	Historical railways	Following station
Markinch; Line and station open	North British Railway; Edinburgh and Northern Railway	Dysart; Line open, station closed

== See also ==
Glenrothes with Thornton railway station
