= Cupar railway station =

Railway station in Fife, Scotland

Cupar
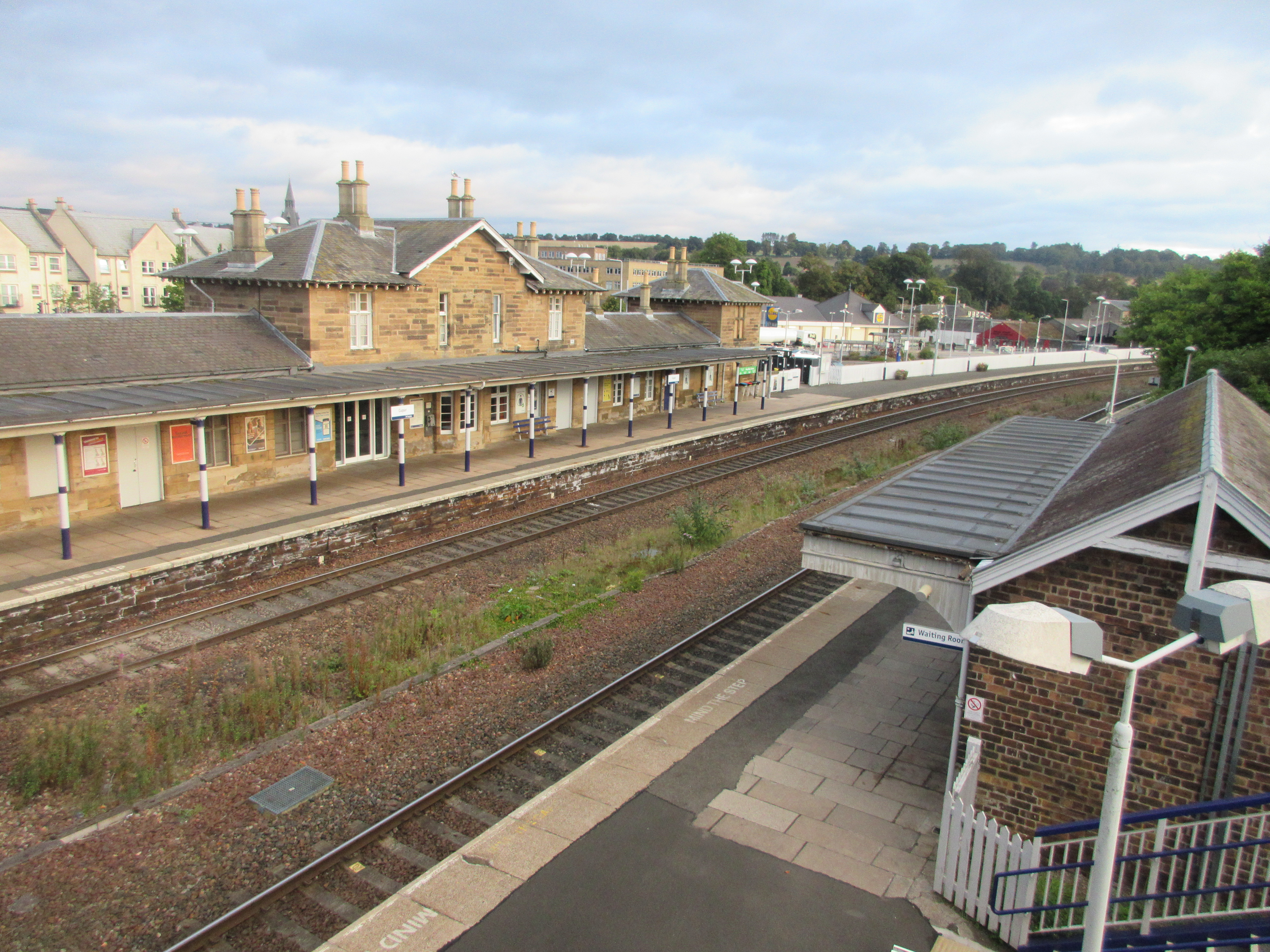
- Cupar railway station

General information
- Location: Cupar, Fife; Scotland
- Coordinates: 56.3174°N 3.0087°W
- Grid reference: NO376143
- Managed by: ScotRail
- Platforms: 2

Other information
- Station code: CUP

Passengers
- 2020/21: ▼22,610
- 2021/22: ▲95,794
- 2022/23: ▲0.122 million
- 2023/24: ▲0.173 million
- 2024/25: ▲0.196 million

Listed Building – Category B
- Designated: 1 February 1972
- Reference no.: LB24292
Location
Notes
- Passenger statistics from the Office of Rail and Road

Cupar railway station is a railway station that serves the town of Cupar in Fife, Scotland. The station has two platforms, of which the southbound one (for trains to Edinburgh) is now wheelchair accessible. Services are provided by ScotRail and CrossCountry.

== History ==
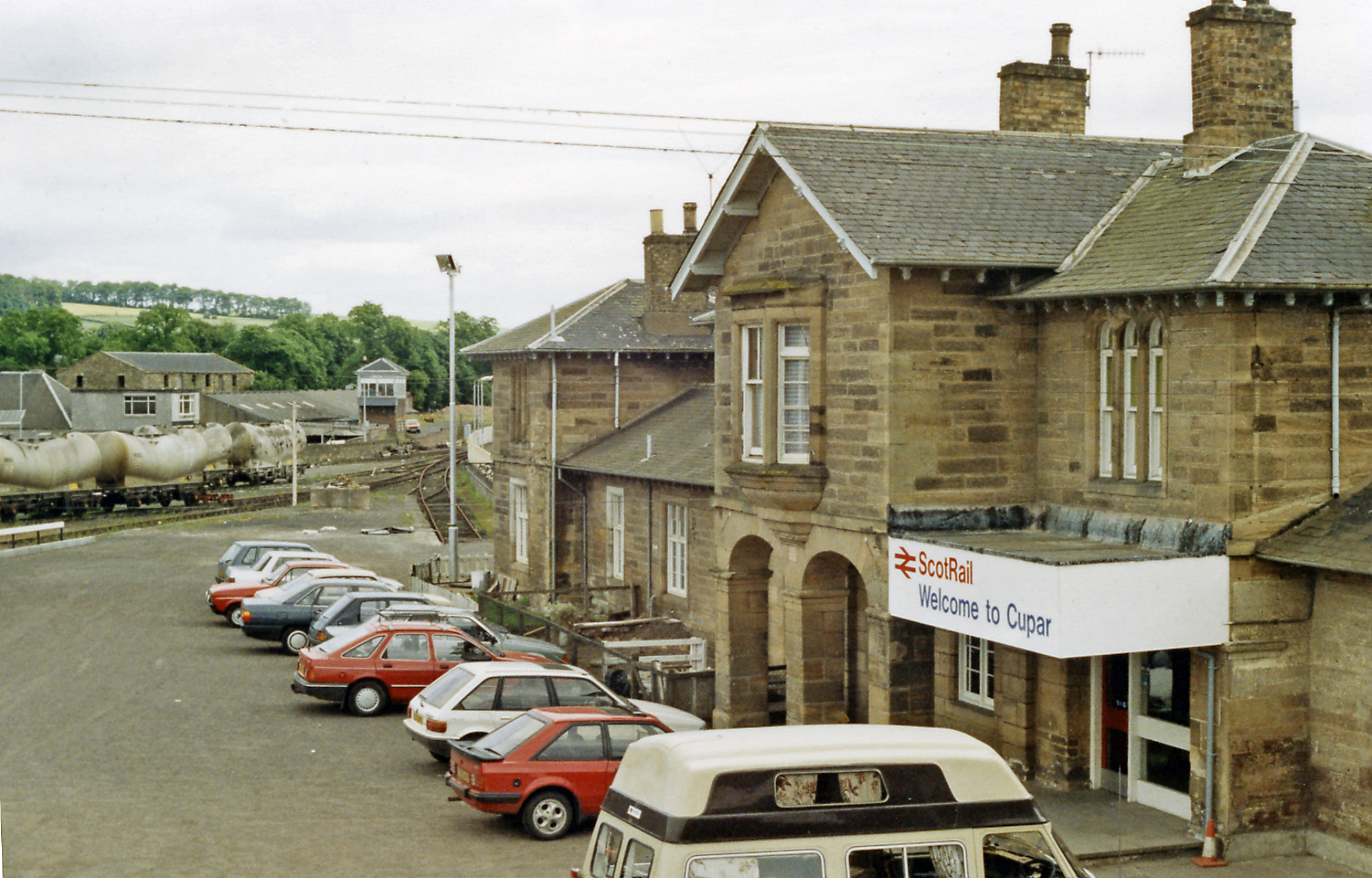
Station approach (1988)

The station was opened by the Edinburgh and Northern Railway in 1847 as the temporary northern terminus of the Tayport branch of their route along the Fife Coast. The line northwards to Tayport (for the ferry link to Dundee) was completed in 1850 and through running to Dundee over the first Tay Bridge began in 1878.

== Accidents and incidents ==
- On 23 October 1899, an express passenger train was in collision with a cattle train. One person was killed.
- On 4 July 1988 a Class 47 cement train derailed, demolishing a section of the bridge which carries the B940 over the railway. This was caused by excessive speed and a fault with the rail line.

== Services ==
The weekday service is as follows:

CrossCountry:

- 1 tpd to Aberdeen.
- 1 tpd to Plymouth.

Scotrail:

- 2 tph to Edinburgh via Kirkcaldy, Inverkeithing and Haymarket. 1 is a limited stop express, the other serves most local stops to Kirkcaldy, then major stations to Edinburgh.
- 1 tph to Aberdeen via Leuchars, Dundee, Arbroath, Montrose and Stonehaven. 1 tpd extended to Inverness via Inverurie in the evening.
- 1 tph to Dundee via Leuchars.
- 1 tpd to Carnoustie, via Leuchars, Dundee, Broughty Ferry, Balmossie, Monifieth, Barry Links and Golf Street.

Sunday services operate every hour each way to Edinburgh & Aberdeen, with some extra evening trains.

Preceding station	National Rail	Following station
Springfield	ScotRail; Edinburgh–Dundee line	Leuchars
Ladybank	CrossCountry; Cross Country Route	Leuchars
