= Markinch railway station =

Railway station in Fife, Scotland

Markinch Scottish Gaelic: Marc-Innis
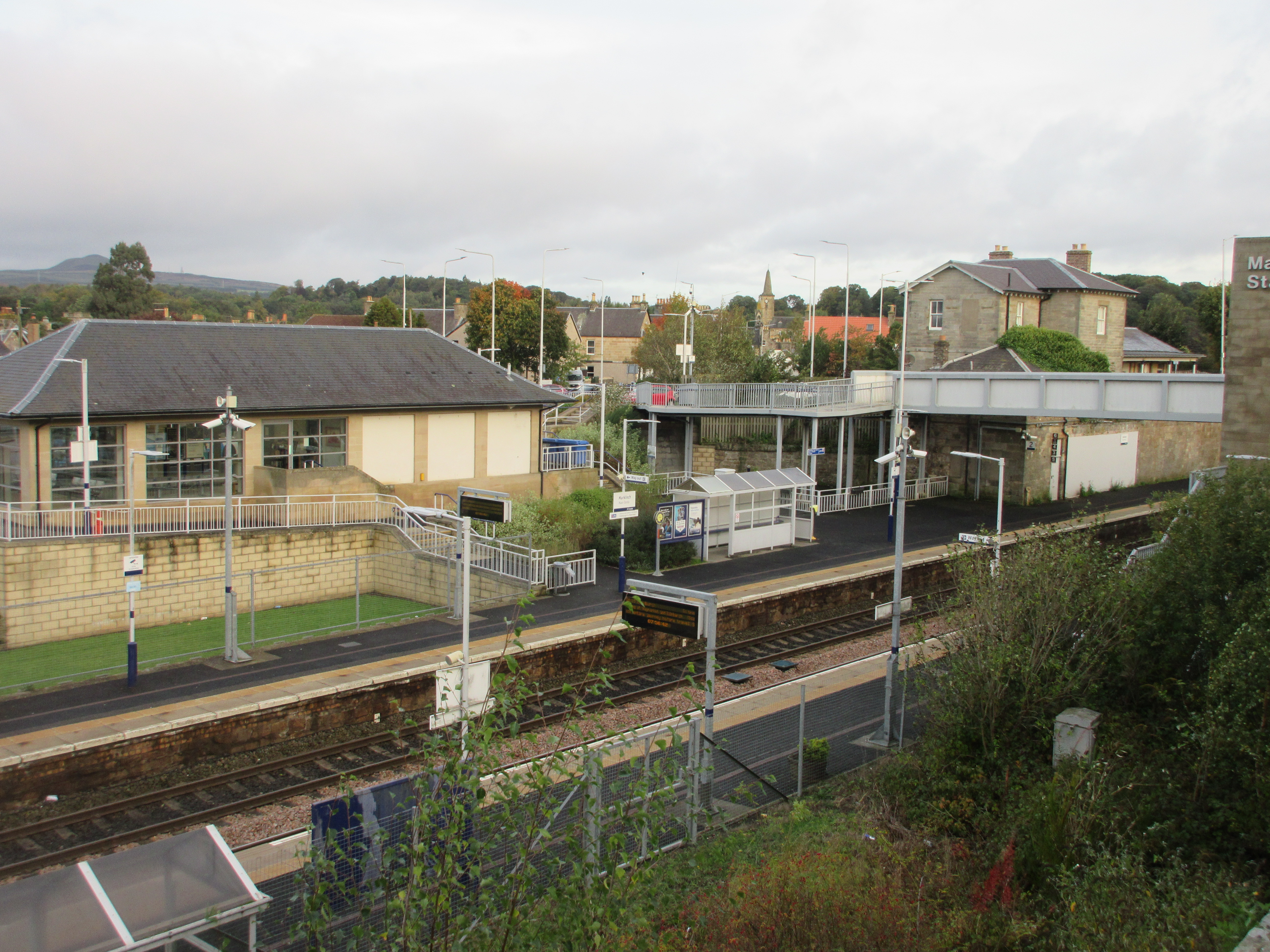

General information
- Location: Markinch, Fife; Scotland
- Coordinates: 56.2005°N 3.1308°W
- Grid reference: NO299015
- Manager: ScotRail
- Platforms: 2

Other information
- Station code: MNC

Passengers
- 2021/22: ▲0.159 million
- 2022/23: ▲0.187 million
- 2023/24: ▲0.252 million
- 2024/25: ▼0.235 million
- 2025/26: ▼0.228 million

Listed Building – Category B
- Designated: 10 September 1979
- Reference no.: LB42936
Location
Notes
- Passenger statistics from the Office of Rail and Road

Markinch railway station is a railway station in Markinch, Fife, Scotland, which serves the Glenrothes, Leslie and Levenmouth areas of Fife. The station is managed by ScotRail and is on the main Edinburgh to Aberdeen Line, 33 miles 20 chains (53.5 km) north of Edinburgh Waverley. There is a crossover at the north end of the station, which can be used to facilitate trains turning back if the line south is blocked. It is situated between Ladybank to the north, Glenrothes with Thornton to the southwest, and Kirkcaldy to the south.

== History ==
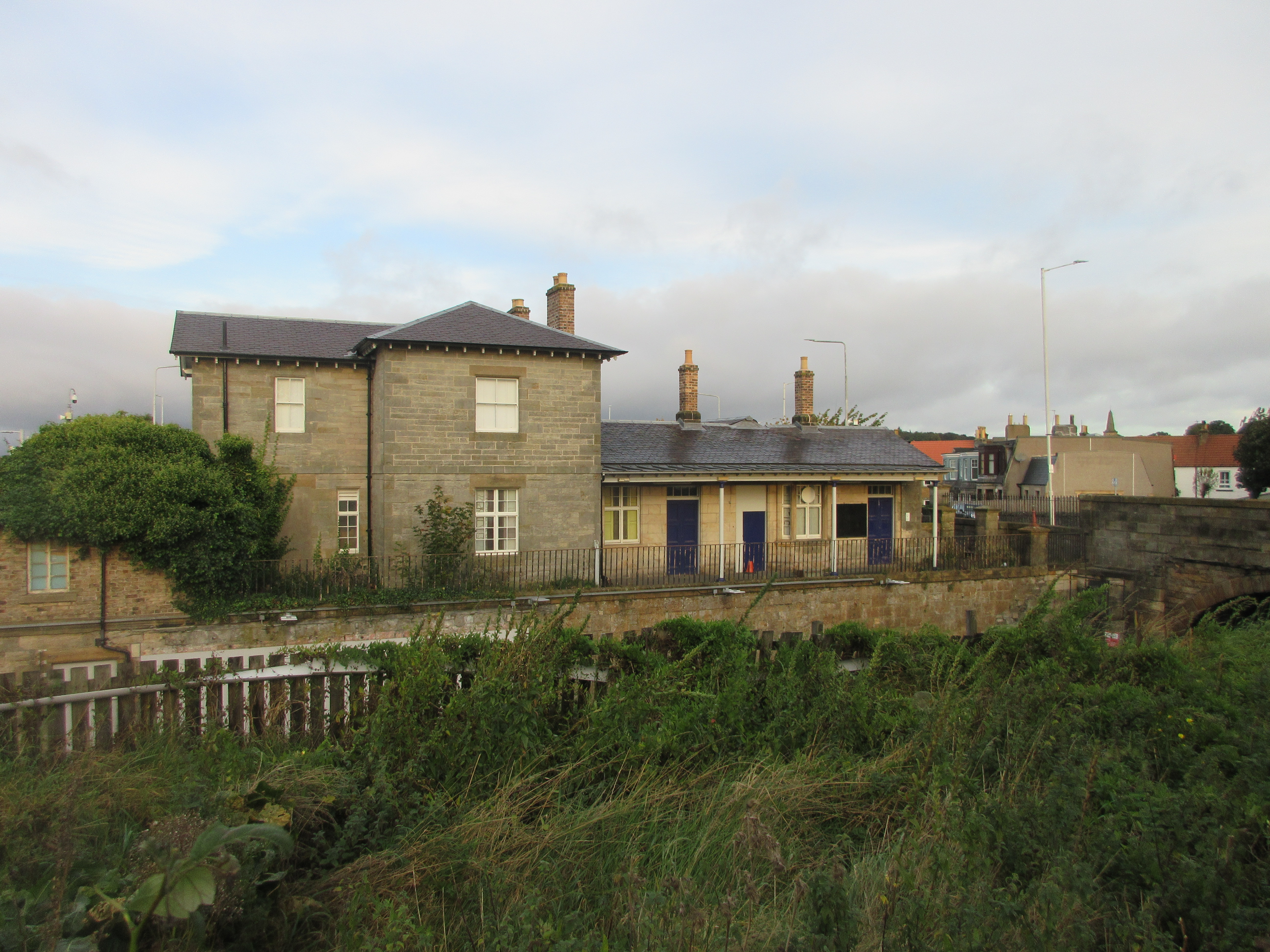
The former station building. The station platforms are in the cutting in front.

The station opened on 20 September 1847. Between 5 May 1975 and 17 May 1982, the station was known as 'Markinch for Glenrothes'.

The now-closed Leslie Railway left the mainline immediately south of this station from its opening on 1 December 1861. This has now been turned into a cycle route.

=== Accidents and incidents ===
On 17 October 2017, a Windhoff Multi-Purpose Vehicle (MPV) hit a fallen tree near the station. With the brakes so severely damaged, the MPV ran backwards for approximately 5 miles, near Thornton North Junction. After running backwards and forwards approximately eight times, the runaway train came to a stop. The crew jumped from the train after 450 metres, sustaining minor injuires.

== Facilities ==
The station was rebuilt in 2007 to include a new building and park and ride facilities for passengers travelling to Glenrothes and the East of Fife. The station is equipped with a ticket office, a ticket machine, toilets, a car park, waiting rooms, a refreshment kiosk, help points, cycle storage and live departure screens. The station has step-free access.

The station buildings are Category B listed.

== Passenger volume ==
Passenger volume at _
	2004–05	2005–06	2006–07	2007–08	2008–09	2009–10	2010–11	2011–12	2012–13	2013–14	2014–15	2015–16	2016–17	2017–18	2018–19	2019–20	2020–21	2021–22	2022–23	2023–24	2024–25
Entries and exits	160,108	169,852	189,744	214,238	236,412	251,744	234,348	248,532	260,084	262,914	283,074	309,498	309,620	316,320	316,612	280,986	32,072	159,160	187,392	251,992	235,210

The statistics cover twelve month periods that start in April.

== Services ==
Services at the station are operated by ScotRail and CrossCountry.

=== ScotRail ===
Most ScotRail services from Edinburgh to Dundee and Perth (each hourly), and some services to Inverness and Aberdeen call at Markinch. Southbound has two trains per hour to Edinburgh. There is one direct service from Glasgow Queen Street each weekday evening.

Sunday services are somewhat irregular and run every two hours in the morning and early afternoon but more frequently thereafter. They run to and from Aberdeen or Inverness northbound.

=== CrossCountry ===
As of May 2026, CrossCountry operate one northbound train per day to Aberdeen and one southbound train a day to Penzance on weekdays. On Sundays, the northbound service terminates at Dundee and the southbound train terminates at Plymouth.

Preceding station	National Rail	Following station
Kirkcaldy or Glenrothes with Thornton; Limited service	ScotRail; Fife Circle Line; Limited service	Ladybank
Kirkcaldy or Glenrothes with Thornton; Limited service	ScotRail; Edinburgh–Dundee line	Ladybank
Kirkcaldy or Glenrothes with Thornton; Limited service	CrossCountry; Cross Country Route	Ladybank
	Historical railways	
Falkland Road; Line open, station closed	North British Railway; Edinburgh and Northern Railway	Thornton Junction; Line open, station closed

== Bibliography ==
- Quick, Michael (2023). Railway Passenger Stations in Great Britain: A Chronology (PDF) (5th ed.). London: Railway and Canal Historical Society.
