= Ladybank railway station =

Railway station in Fife, Scotland

Ladybank
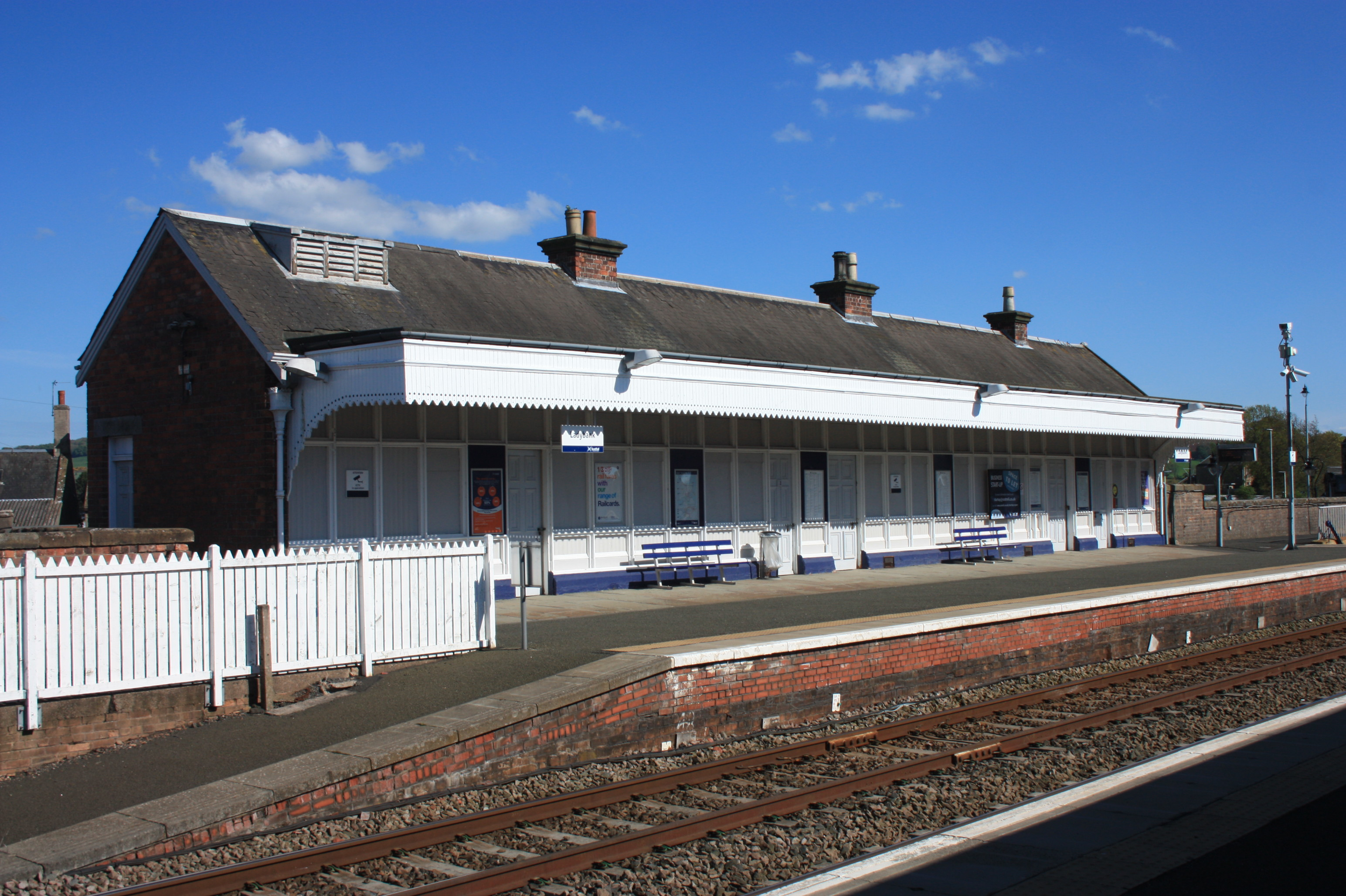
- The north platform building

General information
- Location: Ladybank, Fife; Scotland
- Coordinates: 56.2739°N 3.1215°W
- Grid reference: NO306096
- Managed by: ScotRail
- Platforms: 2

Other information
- Station code: LDY

History
- Original company: Edinburgh and Northern Railway
- Pre-grouping: North British Railway
- Post-grouping: LNER

Key dates
- 17 September 1847: Station opened

Passengers
- 2020/21: ▼8,084
- Interchange: ▼725
- 2021/22: ▲41,836
- Interchange: ▲2,938
- 2022/23: ▲57,990
- Interchange: ▲3,612
- 2023/24: ▲76,708
- Interchange: ▲4,349
- 2024/25: ▲86,454
- Interchange: ▼4,348

Listed Building – Category B
- Designated: 29 June 1978
- Reference no.: LB2479
Location
Notes
- Passenger statistics from the Office of Rail and Road

Ladybank railway station serves the town of Ladybank in Fife, Scotland.

== History ==
The station was opened in 1847 by the Edinburgh and Northern Railway on their line from Burntisland, being the point at which the line divided into two branches to Cupar and Lindores. The latter branch was subsequently extended to Hilton Junction, near Perth the following year. On 8 June 1857, the Fife and Kinross Railway opened, providing a link to Kinross. This line was closed to passengers on 5 June 1950, with the line between Auchtermuchty and Ladybank closing to freight on 29 January 1957.

Passenger trains were also withdrawn on the Perth branch (as far as Bridge of Earn) on 19 September 1955 by the British Transport Commission, the route having been reduced to single track (with a loop at Newburgh) by the London and North Eastern Railway in 1933. The line was retained for freight traffic and was subsequently reopened to passengers in 1975 to provide a shorter route between Perth & Edinburgh than that via Stirling (the direct route from Cowdenbeath via Kinross having been closed in 1970 to free up part of the alignment for the planned M90 motorway).

== Facilities ==
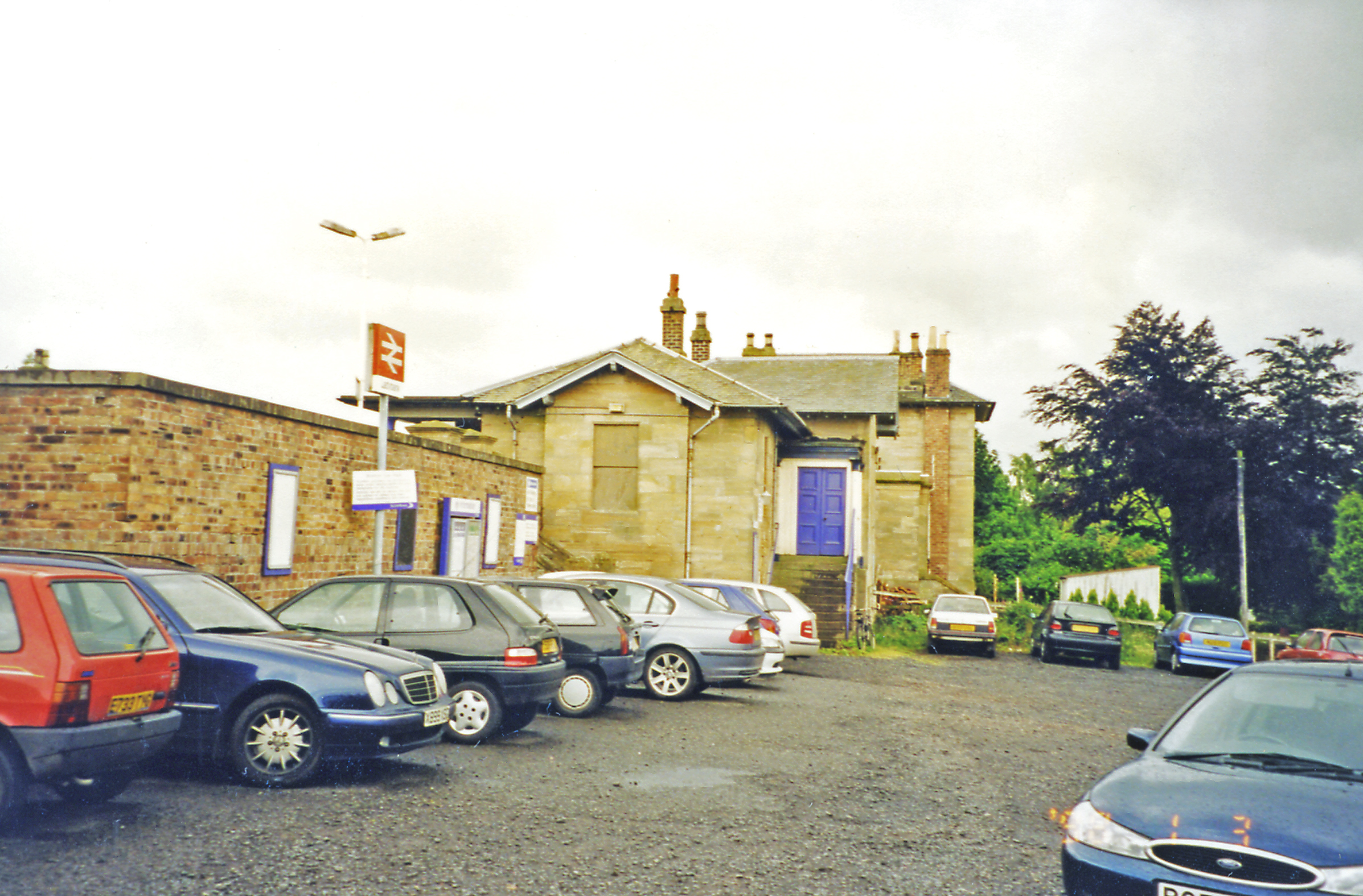
Ladybank station approach (2002)

The station has a ticket office on platform 2, but this is only staffed on a limited basis (mornings only, Mondays to Saturdays). At other times tickets must be purchased on board the train. The main building on platform 1 is now used as an art studio. Standard shelters are available on both platforms, along with a waiting room on platform 1. Train running information is provided via CIS displays, automatic announcements and customer help points. The station subway has steps and is not therefore accessible to wheelchair or mobility-impaired users, but there are step-free access routes to each side via public roads. All trains on the route to and from Perth use platform 1 in both directions, so this should be taken into account if changing trains here.

== Services ==
In the current (summer 2017) timetable, the station is served by two trains per hour to/from Edinburgh - one of these is the hourly semi-fast service to Dundee and the other runs to Perth. The single track nature of this line limits the frequency of services possible to and from Perth, though track upgrades and replacement work has improved matters somewhat by reducing the end-to-end journey time between here and Hilton Junction. A few Perth trains continue north along the Highland Main Line to Inverness. On Sundays, most trains run between Edinburgh and Perth, though a few Aberdeen services call in the morning and evening. Ladybank Junction is signalled from Edinburgh IECC.

As of 21 May 2023, CrossCountry operate one northbound train per day to Aberdeen and one southbound train a day to Penzance on weekdays. On Sundays, the northbound service terminates at Dundee and the southbound train terminates at Plymouth.

Preceding station	National Rail	Following station
Markinch	ScotRail; Edinburgh–Dundee line	Springfield
Markinch	ScotRail; Edinburgh–Dundee line	Perth
Markinch	CrossCountry; Cross Country Route	Cupar
	Historical railways	
Kingskettle; Line open; station closed	North British Railway; Edinburgh and Northern Railway	Springfield; Line and station open
Kingskettle; Line open; station closed	North British Railway; Edinburgh and Northern Railway	Collessie; Line open; station closed
Auchtermuchty; Line and station closed	North British Railway; Fife and Kinross Railway	Terminus
