= Sinclairtown railway station =

Disused railway station in Sinclairtown, Fife

Sinclairtown
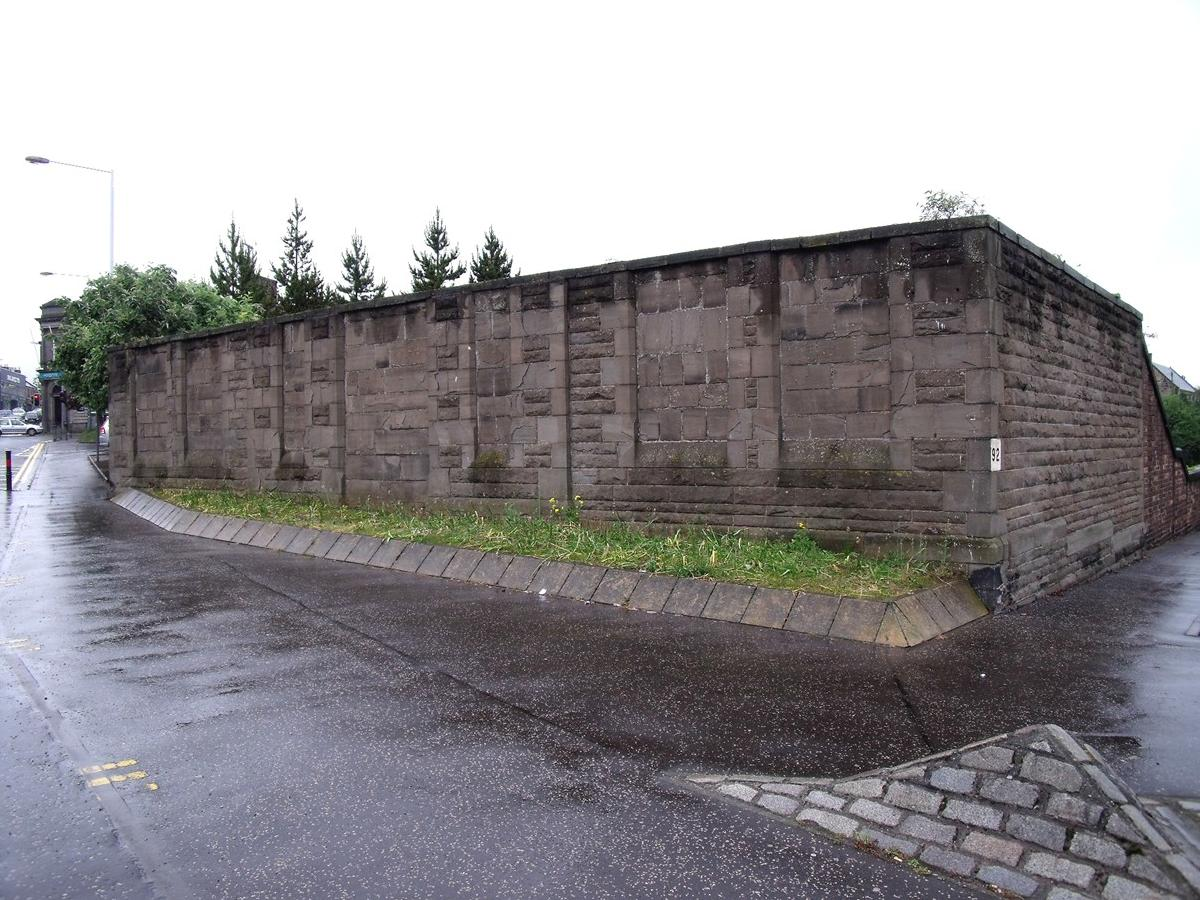
- The site of the station in 2010

General information
- Location: Sinclairtown, Fife; Scotland
- Coordinates: 56.124°N 3.1416°W
- Grid reference: NT291929
- Platforms: 3

Other information
- Status: Disused

History
- Original company: Edinburgh and Northern Railway
- Pre-grouping: North British Railway
- Post-grouping: LNER; British Rail (Scottish Region)

Key dates
- 17 September 1847: Opened
- 1909: Closed and relocated
- 1 January 1917: Closed temporarily
- 2 March 1919: Reopened
- 6 October 1969: Closed
Location

Sinclairtown railway station served the suburb of Sinclairtown, Fife, Scotland from 1847 to 1969 on the Edinburgh and Northern Railway.

== History ==
The station opened on 17 September 1847 by the Edinburgh and Northern Railway. The goods yard was to the west and the signal box was on the west side of the eastbound platform. Another goods yard was built to the south. A siding further to the west served Dunniker Colliery. The first site of the station closed in 1909 and was relocated later in the year. The signal box was moved west of the goods yard. The station closed on 1 January 1917 but reopened again on 2 March 1919 before finally closing on 6 October 1969.

Preceding station	Historical railways	Following station
Dysart; Line open, station closed	North British Railway; Edinburgh and Northern Railway	Kirkcaldy; Line and station open
