= Dysart railway station, Fife =

Disused railway station in Dysart, Fife

Dysart

General information
- Location: Dysart, Fife; Scotland
- Coordinates: 56.1282°N 3.1261°W
- Grid reference: NT301934
- Platforms: 2

Other information
- Status: Disused

History
- Original company: Edinburgh and Northern Railway
- Pre-grouping: North British Railway
- Post-grouping: LNER; British Rail (Scottish Region)

Key dates
- 20 September 1847: Opened
- 6 October 1969: Closed
Location

Dysart railway station served the burgh of Dysart, Fife, Scotland from 1847 to 1969 on the Edinburgh and Northern Railway.

== History ==
The station opened on 20 September 1847 by the Edinburgh and Northern Railway. The goods yard was to the east and the signal box was to the northwest, opposite sidings which served Frances Colliery. The station closed on 6 October 1969.

| Preceding station | Historical railways | Following station |
|---|---|---|
| Thornton Junction; Line open, station closed | North British Railway; Edinburgh and Northern Railway | Sinclairtown; Line open, station closed |
