= Kingskettle =

Coordinates: 56.2626°N 3.1166°W

Kingskettle: Kettle
- Village and Parish
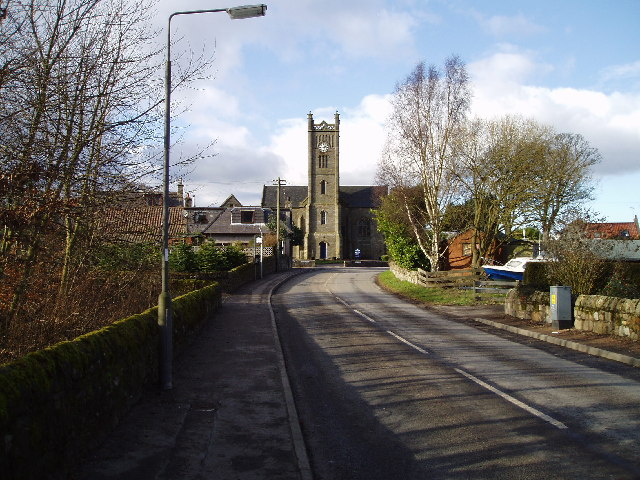
- Kettle Parish Church, the main feature of Kingskettle

- Location within Fife
- Population: 1,020 (2020)
- OS grid reference: NO309083
- Civil parish: Kettle
- Council area: Fife
- Lieutenancy area: Fife
- Country: Scotland
- Sovereign state: United Kingdom
- Post town: CUPAR
- Postcode district: KY15
- Police: Scotland
- Fire: Scottish
- Ambulance: Scottish
- UK Parliament: North East Fife
- Scottish Parliament: North East Fife

Kingskettle or often simply Kettle is a village and parish in Fife, Scotland. Encompassed by the Howe of Fife, the village is approximately 5.5 miles (9 km) southwest of the nearest town, Cupar, and 22 miles (35 km) north of Edinburgh. According to the 2011 Census for Scotland, the Kettle parish had a population of 1,645, of which 1,002 lived in the village.

As with many villages along the River Eden, the primary source of employment and industry in the village was the manufacture of linen. In the wider parish, there is an abundance of fertile farmland that has been taken advantage of for millennia. According to Understanding Scottish Places, Kingskettle is now primarily home to commuters.

The definite origin of the name of Kettle is unknown but dates back to at least the 12th century. It is widely thought that it originates from the word 'battle,' however it would have to be the Pictish form of the word. Alternatively, it is thought the name could stem from the indigenous wildcat. The prefix 'kings' is an obvious association with the crown, with land in the village in the hands of the earls of Fife and other nobility throughout various points in time.

The parish includes the settlements of Kettlebridge, Balmalcolm, Kettlehill, Burnturk, Muirhead, and several farms.

== Governance ==
Both the parish and the village are in the North East Fife UK Parliament and North East Fife Scottish Parliament constituencies, and the Howe of Fife and Tay Coast ward of Fife Council. Local issues are managed by Kettle Community Council.

== Economy ==
Vegetable processing company Kettle Produce have sites in the parish at Balmalcolm and near Freuchie at Orkie farm. They employ over 1,100 staff between these two sites, many from the local area, and process 1,000s of hectares of crops each year.

== Culture ==
The village was the home to children's musical group The Singing Kettle and the shop of the same name. In 2015 the shop was closed as the last group show was performed.

== Education ==
Kettle Primary School, built in 1875, provides primary education for the parish. There are five classrooms and a nursery to the rear of the school. Secondary education is provided at the nearby Bell Baxter High School in Cupar.

== Sport ==
Kingskettle is home to Kingskettle United FC who play in the Kingdom of Fife AFA, the team's home colours are orange and black with light blue and white away kit.

== Transport ==
The A914 runs to the south of the village, providing access to Stagecoach bus services direct to Edinburgh, Glasgow, Dundee and St Andrews which run nearby from Kettlebridge. In addition local services travel to Newburgh and Glenrothes.

Busses to Bell Baxter High School for secondary school pupils are provided by Moffat & Williamson, both ways, from several points in the parish and village.

Kingskettle railway station, opened in 1847, provided valuable passenger and goods links via the North British Railway, but was closed in 1967.

== Religious Sites ==
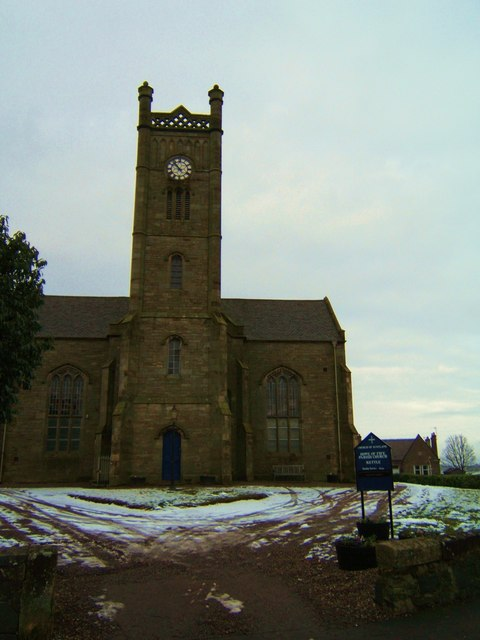
Kettle Parish Church

=== Kettle Parish Church ===
The Church of Scotland parish church at Kettle was designed by George Angus and built in 1832 opposite the graveyard and site of an older church. The church is constructed from snecked sandstone in a Tudor style with a Scottish slate roof. A church hall is located at the southwest of the main building.

The oldest known church in the parish was originally at Lathrisk, near Newton of Falkland and was moved to Kettle opposite the current site in 1636. It was demolished in the 1870s after the new building was completed.

Kettle Parish Church is part of the Howe of Fife Parish Church congregation alongside the churches of Ladybank, Collessie and Cults. Led by Rev. Bill Hunter, Kettle is the main place of worship for the congregation.
