= Springfield railway station (Scotland) =

Railway station in Fife, Scotland

Springfield
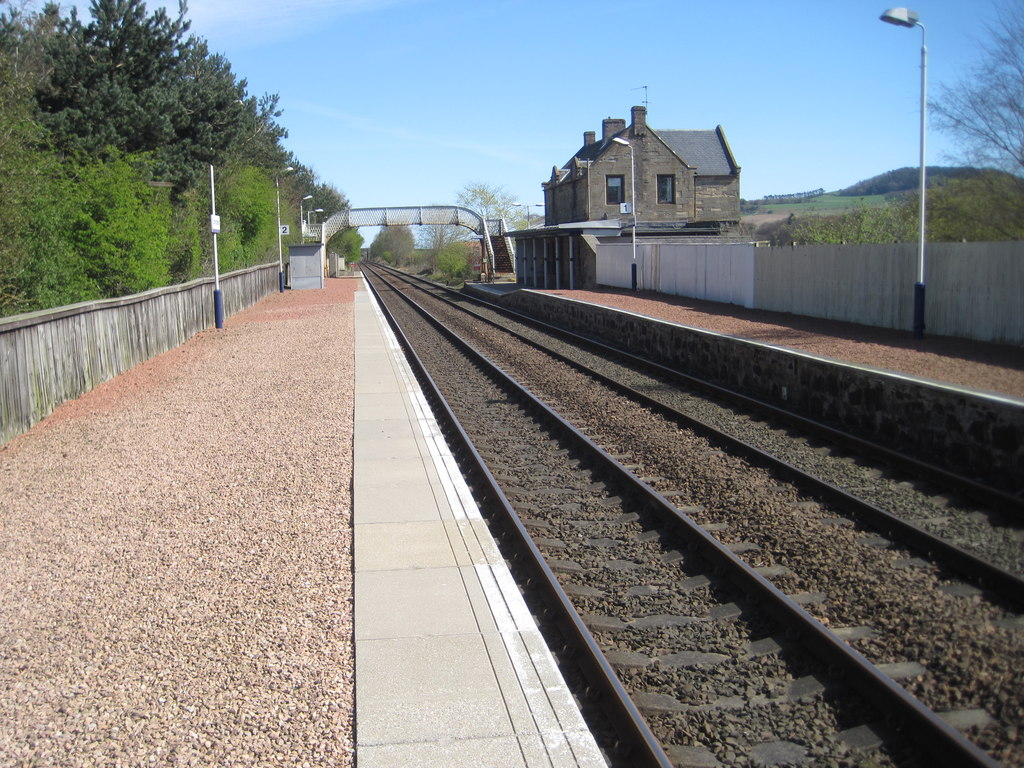
- View of Springfield Railway Station from platform 2

General information
- Location: Springfield, Fife; Scotland
- Coordinates: 56.2950°N 3.0528°W
- Grid reference: NO349119
- Manager: ScotRail
- Platforms: 2

Other information
- Station code: SPF

Key dates
- 17 September 1847: Opened

Passengers
- 2021/22: ▲880
- 2022/23: ▲1,190
- 2023/24: ▼1,144
- 2024/25: ▲1,438
- 2025/26: ▼1,238
Location
Notes
- Passenger statistics from the Office of Rail and Road

Springfield railway station serves the village of Springfield in Fife, Scotland. The station has two platforms and is unstaffed. Services are operated by ScotRail.

== History ==
The station was opened in 1847 by the Edinburgh and Northern Railway and was likely designed by David Bell, an architect who worked on the railway and is credited with the design of other stations in the area.

To the west of the station, the Cults and Pitlessie Lime Works industrial spur line met the mainline at Cults siding, allowing access to the Cults and Pitlessie Lime Works and Pitlessie Maltings to the south. In 1947 this line was closed. Remnants of the railway, including a number of bridges, can be found on the Crawford Priory Estate.

== Services ==
Only a few trains are scheduled to stop at Springfield Station. On Mondays to Saturdays in the May 2021 timetable, 3 northbound and 2 southbound trains called here. This remains the case in the summer 2026 equivalent.

There is no Sunday service.

=== Routes ===
Preceding station	National Rail	Following station
Ladybank	ScotRail; Edinburgh–Dundee line Mondays-Saturdays only	Cupar

== Sources ==
- Butt, R. V. J. (October 1995). The Directory of Railway Stations: details every public and private passenger station, halt, platform and stopping place, past and present (1st ed.). Sparkford: Patrick Stephens Ltd. ISBN 978-1-85260-508-7. OCLC 60251199. OL 11956311M.
