= Falkland Road railway station =

Disused railway station in Freuchie, Fife

Falkland Road
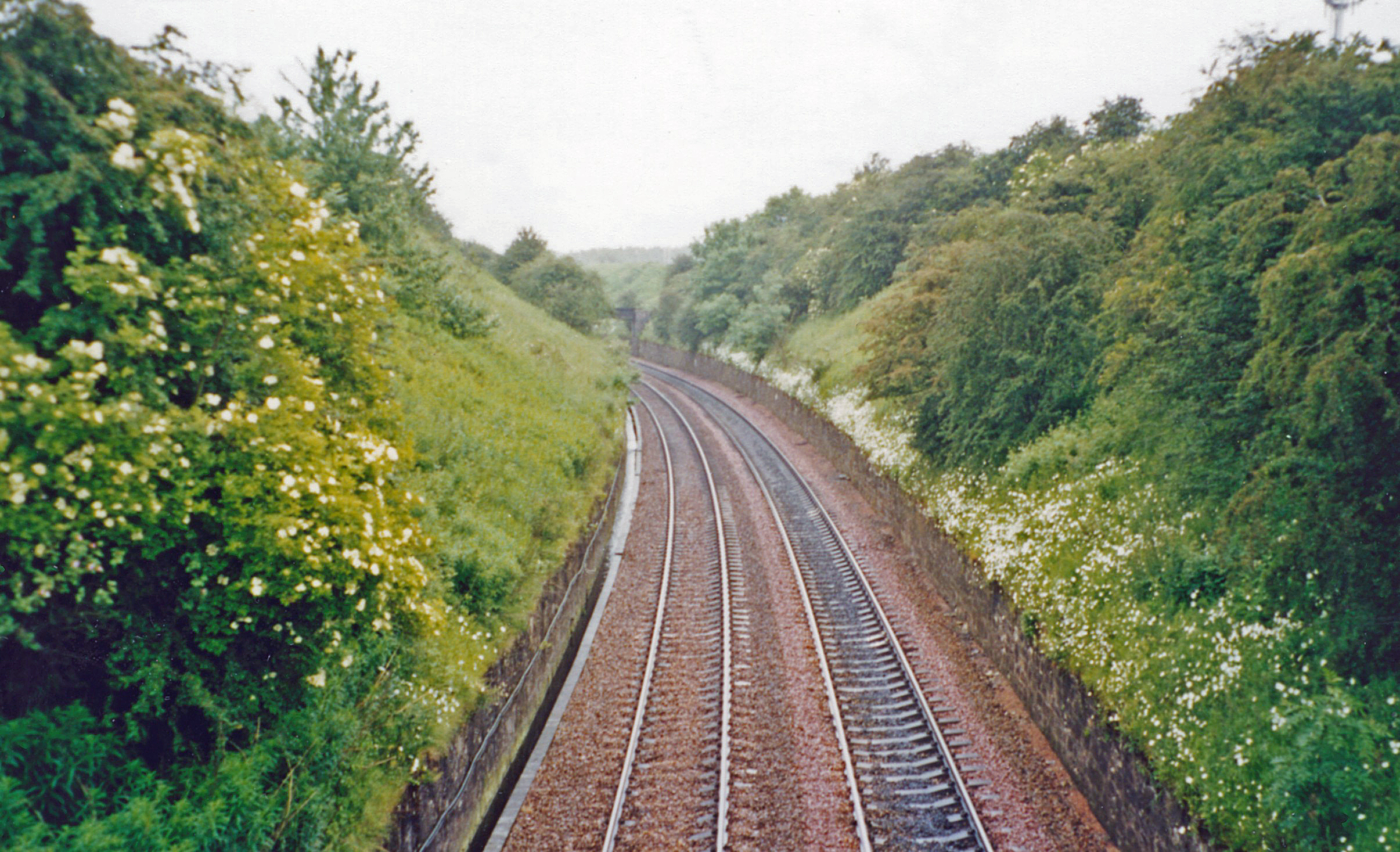
- The site of the station in 2002

General information
- Location: Freuchie, Fife; Scotland
- Coordinates: 56.2387°N 3.1516°W
- Grid reference: NO257087
- Platforms: 2

Other information
- Status: Disused

History
- Original company: Edinburgh and Northern Railway
- Pre-grouping: Edinburgh and Northern Railway; North British Railway
- Post-grouping: LNER

Key dates
- 20 September 1847: Opened
- 15 September 1958: Closed
Location

Falkland Road railway station served the village of Freuchie, Fife, Scotland from 1847 to 1958 on the Edinburgh and Northern Railway. It lay almost 1 kilometre to the south of the village at the north end of the Markinch Gap.

== History ==
The station was opened on 20 September 1847 by the Edinburgh and Northern Railway. To the northwest was the goods yard and at the north end of the southbound platform was the signal box. The station closed to both passengers and goods traffic on 15 September 1958.

Preceding station	Historical railways	Following station
Kingskettle; Line open, station closed	Edinburgh and Northern Railway	Markinch; Line and station open
