= Kingskettle railway station =

Disused railway station in Kingskettle, Fife

Coordinates: 56.2617°N 3.1195°W

Kingskettle
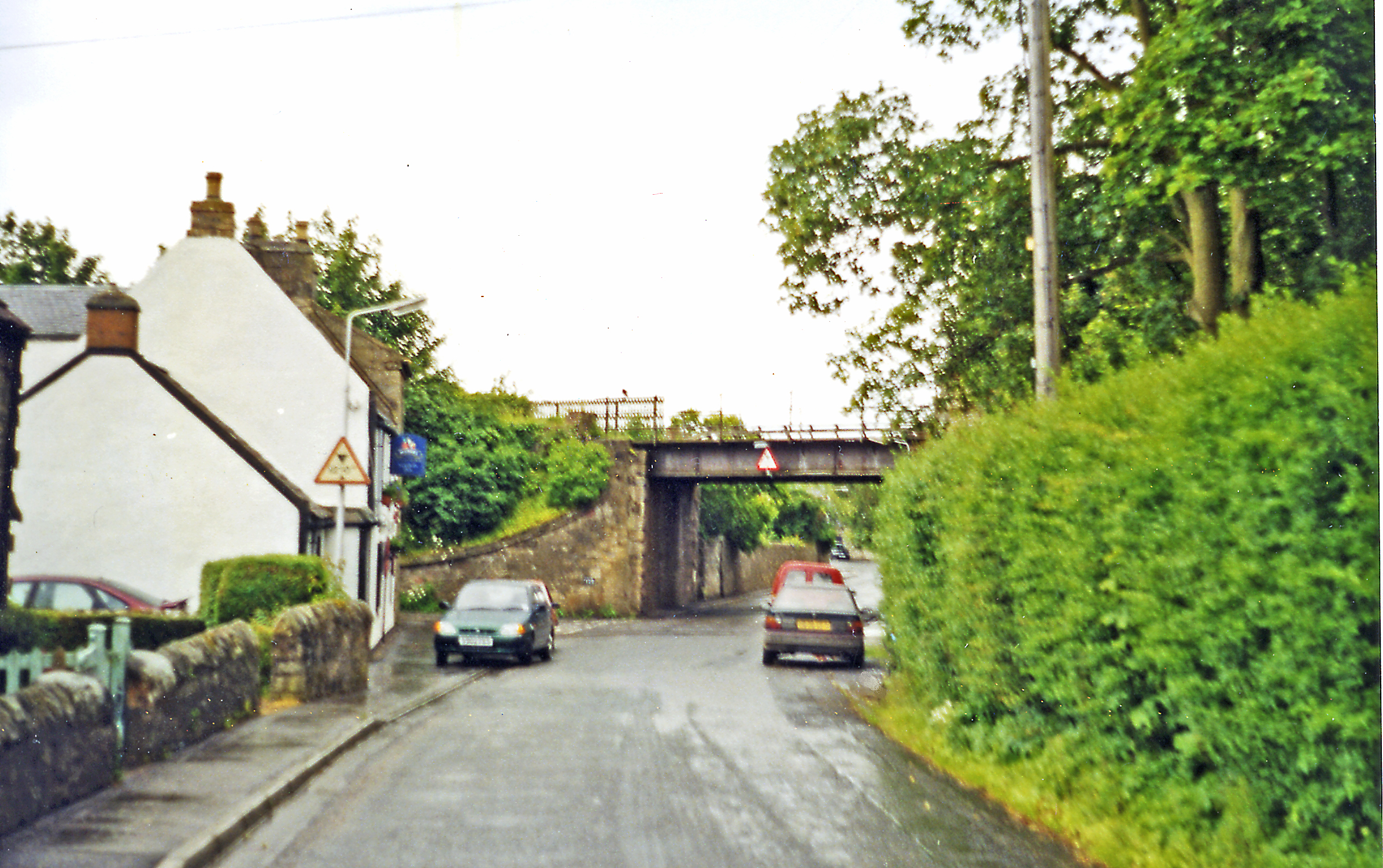
- The site of the station, looking east, in 2002

General information
- Location: Kingskettle, Fife; Scotland
- Platforms: 2

Other information
- Status: Disused

History
- Original company: Edinburgh and Northern Railway
- Pre-grouping: North British Railway
- Post-grouping: LNER; British Rail (Scottish Region)

Key dates
- 20 September 1847: Opened
- 1 January 1917: Closed
- 1 February 1919: Reopened
- 4 September 1967: Closed permanently
Location

Kingskettle railway station served the village of Kingskettle, Fife, Scotland, from 1847 to 1967 on the Edinburgh and Northern Railway.

== History ==
The station opened on 20 September 1847 by the Edinburgh and Northern Railway. The goods yard, closed in 1965, was sited to the west opposite the signal box. The station closed on 1 January 1917 but reopened on 1 February 1919, before closing permanently on 4 September 1967.

Preceding station	Historical railways	Following station
Ladybank; Line and station open	North British Railway; Edinburgh and Northern Railway	Falkland Road; Line open, station closed
