= Balmalcolm =

Village in Fife, Scotland

Coordinates: 56.2622°N 3.101°W

- Village
- Location within Fife
- OS grid reference: NO 319 083
  - Edinburgh: 22 mi (35 km)
- Council area: Fife
- Lieutenancy area: Fife
- Country: Scotland
- Sovereign state: United Kingdom
- Post town: CUPAR
- Postcode district: KY15
- Police: Scotland
- Fire: Scottish
- Ambulance: Scottish
- UK Parliament: North East Fife
- Scottish Parliament: North East Fife

Balmalcolm is a small village in the Kettle parish of Fife, Scotland. Encompassed by the low-lying Howe of Fife, the village is roughly 5 1/2 miles (9 km) southwest of Cupar, the nearest town, and around 22 miles (35 kilometres) north of Edinburgh.

== History ==
The village first appeared on maps in the mid-eighteenth century and its naming was likely inspired by the name Ballingall, the name of the family which once owned the land on which it lies.

Balmalcolm was the centre of some controversy in the late 1990s when a high level of nitrates were found in the local borehole, which was attributed to the intensive farming of the local area with green vegetables. The area was the first part of Scotland to be designated a Nitrate Vulnerable Zone, and nine farms were required to follow an action programme in regards to their nitrate usage as a result.

== Economy ==
Surrounded by farms, vegetable packing business Kettle Produce chose Balmalcolm Farm as its headquarters and was founded by two farming families in 1985 after a partnership dating back to 1976. The Balmalcolm facility is 11,500 square metres (0.0115 km^{2}) and employs 1,000 staff from the local area, however the company have since expanded to the rest of the UK and into mainland Europe.

Farm shop, cafe, and children's play experience Muddy Boots was a popular local attraction in Balmalcolm. Set on a farm owned by the same family for three generations, the business had its roots in the 1950s, expanded substantially since then, but folded in 2022. The site now houses a beer brewery and tap room, a cafe and a sauna.
