= Ladybank =

Coordinates: 56.2744°N 3.122°W

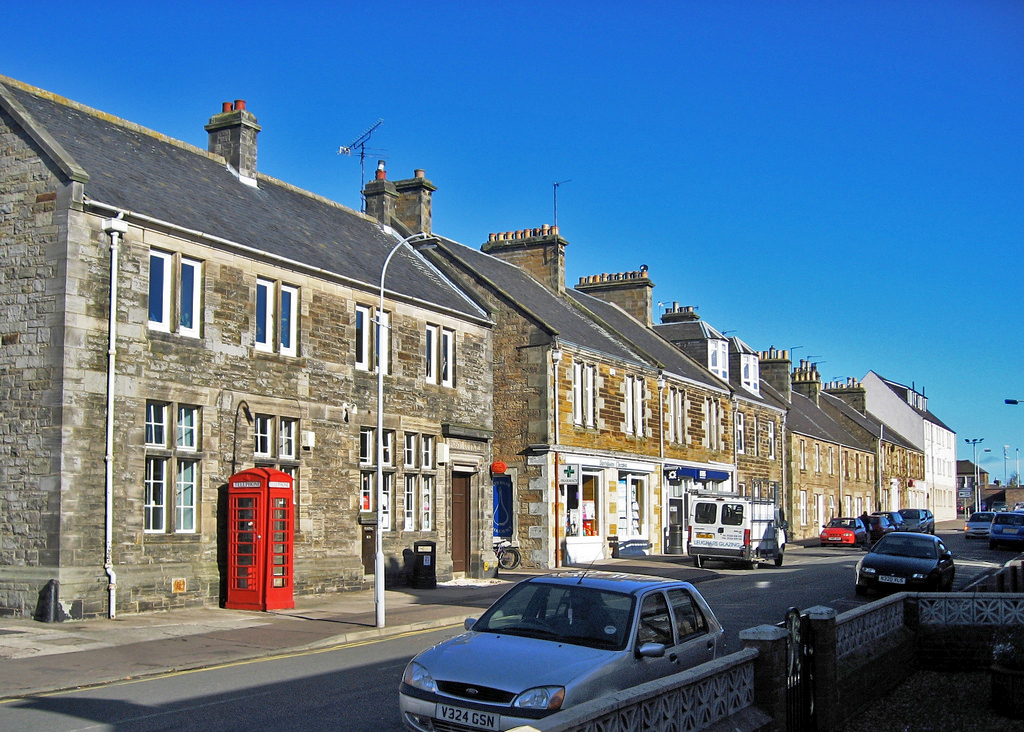
- Commercial Street, Ladybank

- Location within Fife
- Population: 1,430 (2020)
- OS grid reference: NO306096
- Council area: Fife
- Lieutenancy area: Fife
- Country: Scotland
- Sovereign state: United Kingdom
- Post town: CUPAR
- Postcode district: KY15
- Dialling code: 01337
- Police: Scotland
- Fire: Scottish
- Ambulance: Scottish
- UK Parliament: North East Fife
- Scottish Parliament: North East Fife

Ladybank is a village and former burgh of Fife, Scotland. It is about 62 kilometres (39 mi) north of Edinburgh, 8 kilometres (5.0 mi) southwest of Cupar, close to the River Eden. Its 2006 population was estimated at 1,582.

== History ==
Before the 18th century, this area was mostly marshland. In 1247 Roger de Quincy, 2nd Earl of Winchester granted the monks of Lindores Abbey the right to cut peat from a peat-moss called Monegre, to which monks gave the name Our Lady's Bog (the southwestern part of the village is still called Monkstown). Over time this name was shortened to Ladybog.

When the Edinburgh and Northern Railway was constructed in the 1840s, a junction was built here with lines heading towards Perth and Dundee. An engine depot (of which only the disused locomotive shed survives) and a railway station were constructed at the junction. The station was named 'Ladybank Station' rather than 'Ladybog Station', and the village that developed around the station took the name Ladybank. The Fife and Kinross Railway, which opened in 1857, used Ladybank as its eastern terminus further increasing the importance of the station. Ladybank railway station remains largely unaltered, and may be the oldest unaltered station in Scotland.

The village became a burgh in 1878, and became an industrial centre, with linen weaving, coal mining, and malting the principal industries.

== Governance ==
Local issues in Ladybank are governed by the Ladybank and District Community Council. It is in the Howe of Fife and Tay Coast ward of Fife Council. It is part of the North East Fife Scottish Parliament constituency and the North East Fife United Kingdom Parliament constituency.

== Geography ==
Ladybank is located about 37 kilometres (23 mi) north of Edinburgh, 23 kilometres (14 mi) southwest of Dundee, and 24 kilometres (15 mi) southeast of Perth. It is at OS grid reference NO 30 09, about 45 metres (148 ft) above mean sea level. It is situated in the Howe of Fife, a narrow low-lying plain that follows the course of the River Eden, known for its agriculture.

== Demography ==
At the time of the United Kingdom 2001 Census the population of Ladybank was 1,487 people. The racial composition of Ladybank's population was 99.6% white (White British, White Irish, or White Other), 0.13% Asian, 0.13% black, and 0.13% mixed or other race. Below is a table outlining population change of Ladybank burgh since 1901.

Year	1891	1901	1911	1921	1931	1951	1991	2001
Population	1,200	1,340	1,266	1,168	1,128	1,149	1,373	1,487
Source: A Vision of Britain through Time

== Landmarks ==
Ladybank Parish Church was constructed in 1874–76 by architects Peddie & Kinnear. Ladybank golf course was founded in 1879 and a six-hole course designed by Old Tom Morris. The course was expanded to 18 holes in 1961 and has been used as a qualifier for The Open Championship.

== Transport ==
The main road transport route through Ladybank is the A92, which runs along the western edge of the town connecting with Dundee to the north and the M90 motorway to the south. Ladybank railway station is a mainline railway station with regular service operated by ScotRail between Edinburgh and Dundee/Perth.

== Education ==
Ladybank School, constructed in the 1890s, is a primary school. It serves Ladybank and the outlying hamlets of Edenstown and Giffordtown, and is attended by 138 children, who are split into six classes. There are no secondary schools in the town; most secondary school age children attend Bell Baxter High School in Cupar or St Andrew's RC High School in Kirkcaldy.
