= Edinburgh and Northern Railway =

Railway in Scotland

Overview
- Locale: Scotland
- Dates of operation: 1845–29 July 1862
- Successor: North British Railway

Technical
- Track gauge: 4 ft 8 1/2 in (1,435 mm) standard gauge

The Edinburgh and Northern Railway (E&NR) was a railway company authorised in 1845 to connect Edinburgh to both Perth and Dundee. It relied on ferry crossings of the Firth of Forth and the Firth of Tay, but despite those disadvantages it proved extremely successful. It took over a short railway on the southern shore of the Forth giving a direct connection to Edinburgh, and it changed its name to the Edinburgh, Perth and Dundee Railway.

It operated passenger and goods ferryboats over the two firths directly, but seeking to overcome the cost of manhandling goods and minerals at the quays, it introduced a revolutionary system in which railway goods wagons were transferred on to rails on the steamers by means of movable ramps. The wagons moved on their own wheels and this system formed the world's first roll-on roll-off railway ferry service, in use from 1850.

The Edinburgh, Perth and Dundee Railway was taken over by the North British Railway in 1862. The ferry system was a success, but competing land routes had a considerable advantage, and the North British Railway determined to bridge the Forth and the Tay, as part of a strategy to create an efficient and modern route from Edinburgh to Aberdeen. This was achieved in 1890.

Much of the network remains in use, although the northern extremity from Leuchars to the Tayport ferry terminal has closed, and some sections of the Dunfermline branch have closed.

== History ==
=== Before railways ===
The natural barrier of the Firth of Forth had for centuries impeded transport between Edinburgh and Fife, and points north. The Firth of Tay presented another barrier further north, and the most expeditious route from Edinburgh to Dundee and beyond was a coastal steamer from Leith. Intermediate locations were served by ferry crossing the Forth, but the harbours available were primitive and the crossings in many cases were hazardous. A number of different harbour locations were tried, but no obviously dominant route developed before the railway age.

=== A railway from Edinburgh to the Forth ===
The first definite move to form a railway connection was the Edinburgh and Newhaven Railway, which obtained an act of Parliament, the Edinburgh, Leith and Granton Railway Act 1836 (6 & 7 Will. 4. c. cxxxi), on 13 August 1836. The engineering design for the line was by Thomas Grainger and John Miller, who had made their name on the Monkland and Kirkintilloch Railway in 1823, and a number of other Scottish lines subsequently. However the costs of building the line were beyond the resources of the company, and nothing was done for some time.

After a change of northern terminal location, the Edinburgh, Leith and Newhaven Railway opened in 1842 as far as Trinity, a little to the west of Newhaven. However this intended harbour was not developed, and a further change of terminal, to Granton, was adopted. The line opened to there from Canal Street, in the complex that later became Waverley station, in 1846. The primary purpose of the line was the conveyance of passengers and goods to harbours on the Firth of Forth, from where ferries provided onward transport to locations in Fife and further afield, including northern parts of Scotland and the east coast of England.

The Duke of Buccleuch developed Granton Harbour and arranged for efficient ferries to be operated from there to Fife; the principal ferry harbour was Burntisland.

=== A railway across Fife ===
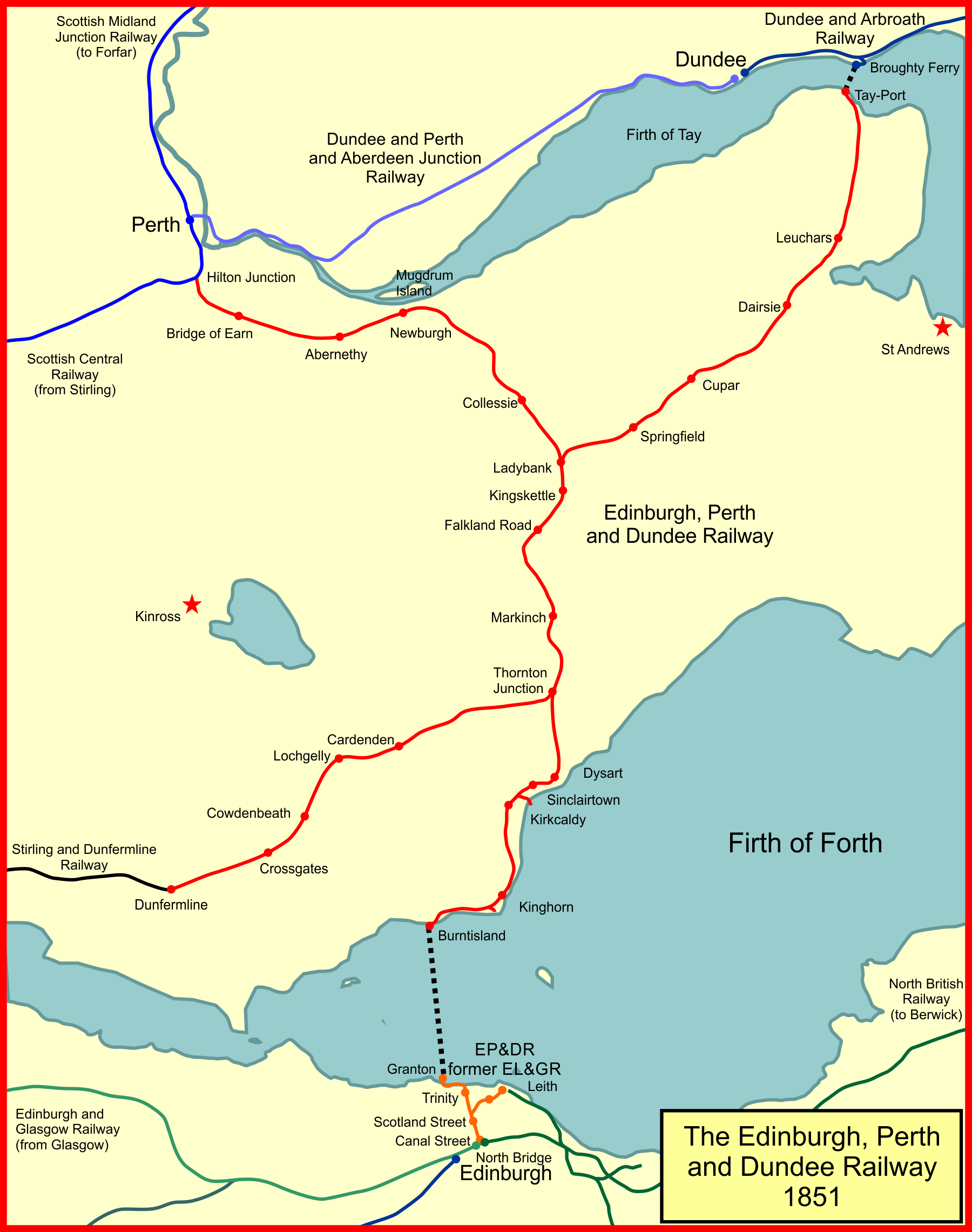
The Edinburgh, Perth and Dundee Railway system in 1851

As early as 1819 a railway had been proposed, starting from Burntisland to the Firth of Tay. The engineer Robert Stevenson designed a line, but nothing further was done. Further proposed schemes followed in 1835 and 1836. In October 1840 a definite decision was taken to adopt one of these schemes, but now the money market was difficult and it was decided to delay until conditions improved. Two competing schemes were put forward in the intervening period, but they came to nothing. So it was that early in 1844 a prospectus was issued for the Edinburgh, Dundee and Northern Railway, with capital of £800,000. this was to be the scheme designed by Thomas Grainger and his partner John Miller. On 1 March 1844 the title of the proposed company was shortened to the Edinburgh and Northern Railway. It was to run from Burntisland through Kirkcaldy and Markinch to Ladybank and Newburgh, on the southern shore of the Tay. At Newburgh the line was to cross the Tay and make a junction with the proposed Dundee and Perth Railway, over which E&NR trains would get access to Perth along the north shore of the Tay.

Although there was enthusiasm for such a line, only about half the subscription required to present a bill in Parliament was forthcoming, and the chairman of the provisional committee proposed that a more modest scheme be drafted, and the intended presentation in the 1844 session of Parliament had to be deferred.

The revised scheme was for a railway from Burntisland to Kingskettle and then through Newburgh to Perth, crossing the Tay a little above Newburgh and joining the (proposed) Dundee and Perth Railway; and a short branch to Kirkcaldy Harbour, and a longer one to Cupar. The line was to be single, and the Tay crossing was to make use of Mugdrum Island, which separates the Tay into two channels; the southern channel would be crossed by a swing bridge or a floating bridge, and the northern channel by a causeway. The Dundee and Perth Railway would pay half the cost of the Tay crossing. The line from the convergence with the Dundee and Perth line into Perth itself would be operated as two single lines, one for each company; the entire E&NR system would be a single line. The estimated cost of the revised scheme was £500,000.

Interested people in Cupar were dissatisfied that their town was to be served by a terminus reached from the south alone, and proposed a Cupar, Ferry-Port-on-Craig and Dundee Railway to reinstate the earlier proposal, and the Edinburgh and Northern agreed to treat their line in amicable terms.

A proposed Edinburgh and Perth Railway (E&PR) was competing with the E&NR supporters for parliamentary authorisation; they put forward a route via a ferry at Queensferry, with a long branch through Dunfermline and Lochgelly to Kirkcaldy; the branch had the potential to wipe out the lucrative mineral traffic that the E&NR hoped to secure.

In the 1845 parliamentary session, the E&NR had to defend hastily prepared modifications to its earlier plans, and opposition from the Edinburgh and Perth promoters was fierce. Radical mutual compromises were made with the Edinburgh and Perth Railway promoters, and had both schemes passed the remaining E&NR scheme would have been mortally wounded.

There was far worse: now the Admiralty stepped in, together with the magistrates of Perth, objecting to the bridge at Mugdrum, on the grounds of interference with navigation, and it appeared that this opposition could not be overcome: the whole of the Perth line was under threat. The E&NR promoters saw that a Strathearn Junction Railway had been authorised, to build a short connecting line between the proposed E&NR at Newburgh and the proposed Scottish Central Railway line at Hilton Junction. At the last minute the E&NR bought out the Strathearn Junction line and altered their own proposals to reach Perth over its route. Now they did not need to cross the Tay to reach Perth.

Now at the last moment it emerged that the E&PR deposited plans did not comply with standing orders, and the E&PR scheme was summarily thrown out. A stopgap proposal for an E&NR Dunfermline branch had been inserted, and suddenly the E&NR bill including this branch, were authorised. The line was now to be double-track at the instigation of Parliament, heavily increasing costs; and the access to Perth would be over the (proposed) Scottish Central Railway line from Hilton Junction through Moncrieffe Tunnel. Although this involved dependency on another company, and some concomitant compromises, this avoided the crossing of the Tay.

=== The Edinburgh and Northern Railway authorised ===
Edinburgh and Northern Railway Act 1845
- Act of Parliament
- Parliament of the United Kingdom
- Long title: An Act for making a Railway from Burntisland in the County of Fife to the City of Perth, with certain Branches therefrom, to be called "The Edinburgh and Northern Railway."
- Citation: 8 & 9 Vict. c. clviii

Dates
- Royal assent: 31 July 1845

The bill for the Edinburgh and Northern Railway was passed as the Edinburgh and Northern Railway Act 1845 (8 & 9 Vict. c. clviii) on 11 June 1845, and the company was incorporated on 31 July 1845. The authorised extent was from Burntisland to Perth, with a branch to Cupar, and a short Kirkcaldy harbour branch. The line was required to be double track throughout, a financial burden the young company had hoped to avoid.

Edinburgh and Northern Railway (Pettycur Harbour Branch and Deviation) Act 1846
- Act of Parliament
- Parliament of the United Kingdom
- Long title: An Act to enable the Edinburgh and Northern Railway Company to alter their Line of Railway near to Dysart, to make a Branch Railway from Kinghorn to the Harbour of Pettycur, and for other Purposes relating to the said Company.
- Citation: 9 & 10 Vict. c. lxxix

Dates
- Royal assent: 26 June 1846

Tenders for the construction were soon invited, and negotiations with the Duke of Buccleuch resulted in the company adopting the Granton ferries and associated terminals. A short connection to the small harbour at Pettycur was included in the first contract: the Edinburgh and Northern Railway (Pettycur Harbour Branch and Deviation) Act 1846 (9 & 10 Vict. c. lxxix) was obtained retrospectively. Pettycur was a few miles east of Burntisland in the natural shelter of a promontory, and some of the construction materials were landed there. Sixteen locomotives, shortly increased to 26, were ordered from R and W Hawthorn, and rolling stock was also ordered. In addition passenger and cargo ferryboats were ordered.

=== The Edinburgh, Leith and Granton Railway ===
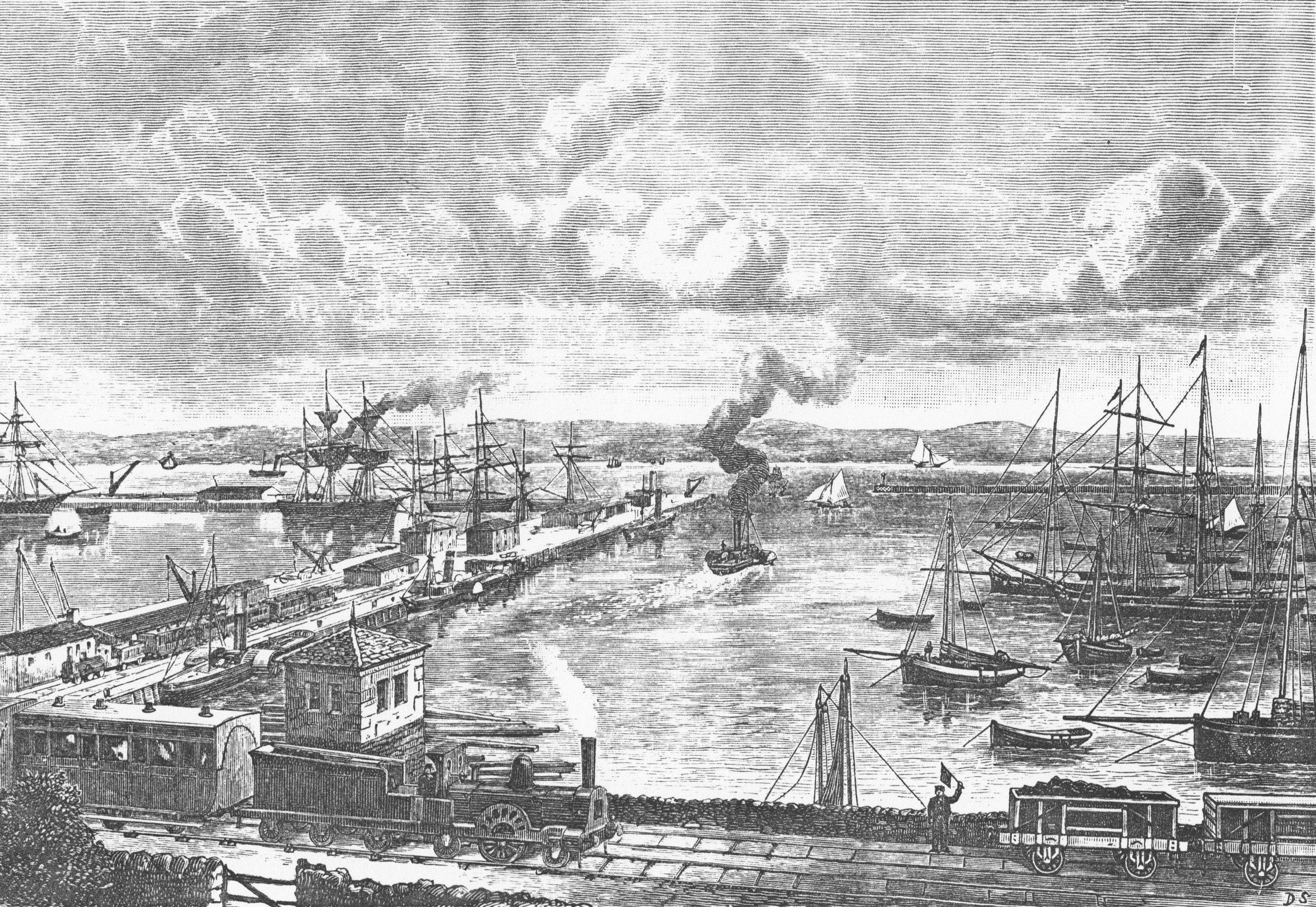
Granton Harbour and Pier

The Edinburgh and Northern Railway was authorised to build its lines in Fife, on the northern side of the Firth of Forth; yet to reach Edinburgh its passengers and goods would have to get from one of the harbours on the south side into the city. In 1836 the Edinburgh, Leith and Newhaven Railway had been authorised to build a line from Princes Street in Edinburgh to the Forth. After some false starts it opened a line from Trinity, close to Newhaven, to Scotland Street, some distance north of Princes Street, in 1842. In 1844 it obtained an act of Parliament, the Edinburgh, Leith and Granton Railway Act 1844 (7 & 8 Vict. c. lxxxi) giving authorisation to extend to Granton Harbour, now seen as a more promising ferry terminal for crossing the Forth, and the Edinburgh, Leith and Newhaven Railway changed its name to the Edinburgh, Leith and Granton Railway (EL&GR).

The company was always short of money, and it sought a larger business to which it might sell its concern. The Edinburgh and Northern Railway was the obvious partner, and the E&NR absorbed the EL&GR by the Edinburgh and Northern Railway Company and Edinburgh, Leith and Granton Railway Company Amalgamation Act 1847 (10 & 11 Vict. c. ccxxxix) of 22 July 1847, taking effect on 7 August 1847. (Note: Awdry says the E&NR bought the EL&GR on 27 July 1847.) The E&NR had not yet opened any of its lines.

=== Opening of the line: in stages ===
In the slump that followed the frenzy of railway promotion of 1845, money became difficult to obtain, and contract prices rose considerably. However the work progressed well in the circumstances, and the Board of Trade inspection for passenger operation of the section from Burntisland to Cupar, and to Lindores on the Perth line, took place on 3 September 1847. The inspecting officer expressed himself well satisfied with the construction, and a ceremonial opening of the line took place on 17 September, with the public service commencing on 20 September. There were four passenger trains each way daily on the Cupar line, with a coach service from Cupar to the ferry for Dundee. Two trains ran to Lindores daily, and the trains from Burntisland connected with ferryboats running in connection with the trains from Canal Street, Edinburgh. The trains were over-subscribed and the service was soon augmented.

On 9 December 1847 the Perth line was extended from Lindores to a temporary terminus at Glenbirnie. On 17 May 1848 the line was extended to another temporary terminus at Abernethy Road and on 25 July 1848 the final extension to Hilton Junction, where it joined with the newly opened Scottish Central Railway. Edinburgh and Northern Railway trains gained access to Perth station through Moncrieffe Tunnel over that company's lines. (Note: Dates from Quick; Thomas and Turnock state on page 312 that the line was opened from Ladybank to Hilton Junction throughout on 18 July 1848. Bruce agrees the latter date on page 55 but refers to the extension from Abernethy (he means Abernethy Road) to Hilton Junction.)

The Dundee line was extended from Cupar to Leuchars on 17 May 1848 (Note: Thomas and Turnock, page 312; on page 60 they say "in June 1849".) and from there to Tayport on 17 May 1848. (Note: Thomas and Turnock, pages 60 and 312 say 17 May 1850 but this must be a mistake.)

Short harbour branches were opened to Kirkcaldy Harbour in October 1848 and to Pettycur Harbour in February 1849, in both cases for goods only. (Note: The Pettycur Harbour branch had already been used for construction purposes since 1845 or 1846.)

=== Other acts of Parliament of 1847 ===
Edinburgh and Northern Railway (Dunfermline Branch Deviation and Extension, &c.) Act 1847
- Act of Parliament
- Parliament of the United Kingdom
- Long title: An Act to enable the Edinburgh and Northern Railway Company to make a Deviation and Extension of their Branch Railway to Dunfermline, to make another Railway from their Strathearn Deviation Railway to the Scottish Central Railway, and to make an Alteration in the Manner of constructing the said Branch and Strathearn Deviation across certain Roads.
- Citation: 10 & 11 Vict. c. ccxx

Dates
- Royal assent: 22 July 1847

Text of statute as originally enacted

Edinburgh and Northern Railway (St. Andrews and Newburgh Harbour Branches and Road Crossings, Newport Railway Extension) Act 1847
- Act of Parliament
- Parliament of the United Kingdom
- Long title: An Act to enable the Edinburgh and Northern Rail way Company to construct Branch Railways to Saint Andrew's and Newburgh Harbour, and to divert and alter the Levels of certain Turnpike Roads in the Line of the Newport Railway Extension.
- Citation: 10 & 11 Vict. c. cclxxvii

Dates
- Royal assent: 22 July 1847

Text of statute as originally enacted

Edinburgh and Northern Railway (Burntisland Pier and Ferry) Act 1847
- Act of Parliament
- Parliament of the United Kingdom
- Long title: An Act to vest in the Edinburgh and Northern Railway Company the Undertaking of the Low-water Pier at Burntisland, and of the Ferry between the same and Granton, and to enable the said Company to extend and improve the said Pier.
- Citation: 10 & 11 Vict. c. cxcii

Dates
- Royal assent: 9 July 1847

Text of statute as originally enacted

Carter says there were two acts of Parliament of 22 July 1847. The first, the Edinburgh and Northern Railway (Dunfermline Branch Deviation and Extension, &c.) Act 1847 (10 & 11 Vict. c. ccxx), authorised a 1.5 mile extension and deviation of the Dunfermline branch and a short connecting line from the E&NR Strathearn deviation to the Scottish Central Railway, with capital of £53,000 for the purpose. The second, the Edinburgh and Northern Railway (St. Andrews and Newburgh Harbour Branches and Road Crossings, Newport Railway Extension) Act 1847 (10 & 11 Vict. c. cclxxvii), authorised a five-mile long St Andrews branch and a one-mile branch to Newburgh Harbour, with authorised capital of £64,000. A further local act of Parliament, the Edinburgh and Northern Railway (Burntisland Pier and Ferry) Act 1847 (10 & 11 Vict. c. cxcii) was passed authorising the acquisition of the Granton to Burntisland ferry.

=== Change of name to the Edinburgh, Perth and Dundee Railway ===
Edinburgh and Northern Railway (Additional Capital) Act 1849
- Act of Parliament
- Parliament of the United Kingdom
- Long title: An Act to enable the Edinburgh and Northern Railway Company to raise a further Sum of Money.
- Citation: 12 & 13 Vict. c. xv

Dates
- Royal assent: 24 May 1849

Text of statute as originally enacted

Edinburgh and Northern Railway (Granton Pier, &c.) Act 1849
- Act of Parliament
- Parliament of the United Kingdom
- Long title: An Act to enable the Edinburgh and Northern Railway Company to construct a Low-water Pier and other Works at Granton; and for other Purposes.
- Citation: 12 & 13 Vict. c. lxxix

Dates
- Royal assent: 1 August 1849

Text of statute as originally enacted

The Edinburgh and Northern Railway was renamed the Edinburgh, Perth and Dundee Railway (EP&DR) by section 28 of the Edinburgh and Northern Railway (Granton Pier, &c.) Act 1849 (12 & 13 Vict. c. lxxix) on 1 August 1849, following a financial reconstruction in May under the Edinburgh and Northern Railway (Additional Capital) Act 1849 (12 & 13 Vict. c. xv). (Note: Marshall, page 48 states it was reincorporated under the new name as part of a financial reconstruction in April 1849. He cites persuasive detail with this date. Bruce agrees (page 62). Ross says (page 35) "in 1849". Awdry refers to the purchase of the EL&GR on 27 July 1847 and the E&NR "company thereupon became the Edinburgh, Perth and Dundee Railway". Thomas and Turnock are silent on the issue, merely referring to much later events (on page 64) and saying, "The Edinburgh Perth & Dundee (as the Edinburgh & Northern had become) ...". Carter states on page 98 that the amalgamation "to from the Edinburgh, Perth and Dundee Railway" took place on 1 August 1847, but in a footnote on the same page he contradicts that by saying that the Edinburgh and Northern Railway Company was dissolved and reincorporated by the act of 1849, and again dissolved and reincorporated by the act of 3 July 1851.)

=== Dunfermline branch ===
A branch line to Dunfermline had been added to the plans at the last moment; it was to leave the main line at Thornton. Although Dunfermline was an ancient and important burgh, the primary objective of the line was to pass through the rich West Fife coalfield. It was opened as far as Crossgates, a little short of Dunfermline, in September 1848. It was halted there while a vexatious battle took place in Parliament over the arrangement to cross, on the level or otherwise, the long-established Halbeath Railway which intersected its proposed route. The opposition was encouraged by the hostile Edinburgh and Perth Railway (which was being promoted, but which ultimately failed to gain parliamentary approval). In the 1848 session the E&NR finally obtained sanction for a level crossing and the extension to Dunfermline itself was opened on 13 December 1849. (Note: Thomas and Turnock, page 62, say that bills were introduced "in 1848" but the dates are consistent with the 1849 session.) The route for passengers from Dunfermline to Edinburgh was extremely circuitous, and this was a source of considerable friction with the railway company for many years. (Note: A direct line, still requiring a ferry crossing of the Forth, opened in 1877.)

In 1850 the Stirling and Dunfermline Railway opened the majority of its line, between Dunfermline and Alloa, opening up a considerable further extent of the West Fife coalfield. It had opened the short section from Dunfermline to Oakley, where there was a colliery, in 1849. In 1852 it extended from Alloa to Stirling, joining there with the Scottish Central Railway and forming an alternative route for West Fife coal to reach Central Scotland, via Stirling.

The Stirling and Dunfermline Railway was vested in the Edinburgh and Glasgow Railway by the Edinburgh and Glasgow and Stirling and Dunfermline Railways Act 1858 (21 & 22 Vict. c. lxiv) of 28 June 1858.

=== Sunday trains ===
Sunday trains were introduced from December 1848. This resulted in constant criticism at subsequent shareholders' meetings from convinced Sabbatarians.

=== The world's first train ferry ===
Edinburgh and Northern Railway (Tay Ferry) Act 1846
- Act of Parliament
- Parliament of the United Kingdom
- Long title: An Act to enable the Edinburgh and Northern Railway Company to purchase the Ferry across the River Tag between Ferry-Port-on-Craig and Broughty.
- Citation: 9 & 10 Vict. c. lxxii

Dates
- Royal assent: 26 June 1846

Edinburgh and Northern Railway (Improvement of the Ferry between Ferry-Port-on-Craig and the North Shore of the River Tay) Act 1847
- Act of Parliament
- Parliament of the United Kingdom
- Long title: An Act to enable the Edinburgh and Northern Railway Company to improve the Ferry between Ferry-Port-on-Craig and the North Shore of the River Tay.
- Citation: 10 & 11 Vict. c. cclxxiv

Dates
- Royal assent: 22 July 1847

Text of statute as originally enacted

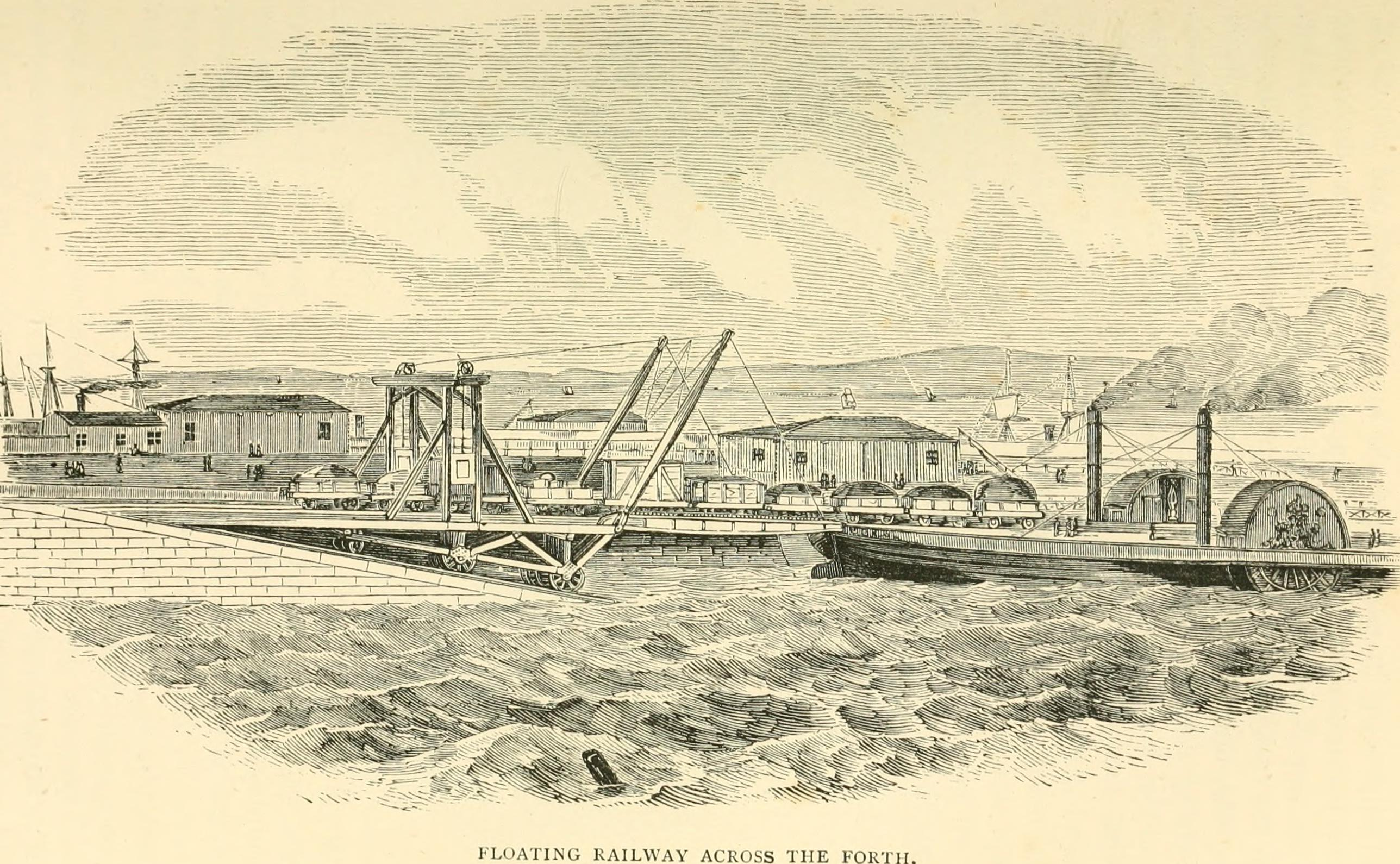
Leviathan and the loading ramp

The Edinburgh and Northern Railway was dependent for its success on efficient crossings of the Firth of Forth and the Firth of Tay. Historically there had been ferry operators (or simply boat operators) plying on these routes, but their service was erratic, and the E&NR set about taking control. In February 1846 the directors announced that they had reached agreement to take possession of the Tayport ferry for £12,600, which was then authorised by the Edinburgh and Northern Railway (Tay Ferry) Act 1846 (9 & 10 Vict. c. lxxii). In July 1847 the E&NR took possession of the ferry operating between Granton and Burntisland under the Edinburgh and Northern Railway (Burntisland Pier and Ferry) Act 1847 (10 & 11 Vict. c. cxcii); it paid £90,000. In July 1847 it obtained an act of Parliament, the Edinburgh and Northern Railway (Improvement of the Ferry between Ferry-Port-on-Craig and the North Shore of the River Tay) Act 1847 (10 & 11 Vict. c. cclxxiv), authorising improvements at Tayport.

The Tayport improvements and the augmented ferry service did not commence until May 1851, by which time £65,900 had been spent on harbour works and £18,000 on steamers. Nonetheless the ferry crossings continued to be unreliable; moreover the passage for goods between Dundee and Edinburgh involved manhandling the goods four times at the four harbours, and the opening of a competing land route via Stirling and Perth (over the Dundee and Perth Railway, opened on 24 May 1847, and the Scottish Central Railway opened on 15 May 1848) posed a very obvious commercial threat.

Considerable technical improvement was necessary at the harbours, and quickly. Consideration was given to installing hydraulic cranes to lift loaded railway wagons on to the deck of steamers.

On 13 or 14 January 1849 the innovative young engineer Thomas Bouch was appointed engineer and manager of the E&NR. Bouch saw that the proposals for hydraulic cranes at the harbours would only partly mitigate the problem, and he immediately put forward a radical scheme: what is now known as a train ferry. The steamship would have railway tracks on its deck and goods wagons—passenger carriages were not planned to be conveyed—would travel on board. At each harbour point there would be a flying bridge (as Bouch described it): this would be a large trolley system capable of running on its own rails on a ramped jetty, and carrying railway tracks. The flying bridge could be moved up or down the ramp and make a connection with the landward tracks; a linkspan at the seaward end connected to the track on the steamer. It was to be hinged at the flying bridge end so as to accommodate tidal variation during the berthing of the ferryboat. The tidal range was about 20 feet (6 m).

The EP&DR directors authorised the scheme at once, and the steamship Leviathan, 399 tons, equipped with railway track, was ready by early September 1849, but the shore works took longer. Leviathan was destined for the Tay crossing at first, but it was decided to transfer her to the Forth crossing instead. Leviathan was a flat bottomed paddle steamer with two railway tracks aboard; a smaller vessel, PS Robert Napier, 296 tons, was constructed for the Tay passage.

The flying bridge system was nearly ready in January 1850 but there was an accident at Burntisland in which a workman was killed; the newspapers reported:

The Edinburgh, Perth and Dundee Railway Company have just completed two moveable slips or platforms, one on each side of the Forth,—viz. at Granton and Burntisland,—for the purpose of conveying across the ferry, by means of their floating railway, or large steamer Leviathan, goods, minerals, &c., without breaking bulk. The platforms are moved up and down the slip, so as to suit the state of the tide, by means of a small stationary engine placed at the top of the slip, and the trucks or waggons are run down the platform on to rails placed on the deck of the steamer, which has been constructed in such a manner that thirty loaded trucks at one time can, with the greatest ease, be conveyed across the ferry on her deck.

We understand that early last week the slip at Granton was tried for the first time, and found to answer the expectations of its most sanguine promoters. The other one, at Burntisland, at which the melancholy accident occurred, was tried on Saturday morning [26 January 1850], and found to be equally successful. It appears that another trial of the Burntisland slip was fixed to take place in the afternoon; and while preparations were being made for what is called putting the engine into gear, by which the platform is moved up and down the slip, two of the workmen, unknown to any of the officials, had got under the platform, one of whom, thinking that all was right, but without receiving a signal to that effect, slipped out the "palls" [pawls] which hold the platform to the slip, the consequence of which was that the heavy mass rushed down the slip at a fearful velocity into the sea, the two poor men being underneath it, and one of them was so dreadfully mangled that ... it was found that life was extinct.

A demonstration journey using the flying bridge system took place on 30 January 1850, when 12 wagons were transferred from the shore to Leviathan, followed by the directors' in their own coach. Leviathan then crossed the Forth and the directors alighted at Granton without mishap. Commercial operations could not be started immediately as further work on the shore installations was required.

Reports printed in contemporary newspapers differ in the details and the date:

The first experimental trial took place [on the Granton to Burntisland sector] on Wednesday last [6 February 1850] in the presence of the directors, and was eminently successful. We may mention that the spacious deck of the steamer is capable of holding a train of from 30 to 40 loaded trucks, and on Wednesday, 12 trucks, laden with coals and general merchandise, were taken on board at Burntisland in about seven minutes. The time occupied by the steamer in crossing [to Granton] was 25 minutes, and the trucks were safely run ashore at Granton in the course of three minutes afterwards ... (Note: At the time many newspaper reports were reprinted from others. A similar narrative appeared in the Newcastle Journal of 9 February 1850. It is possible that the reference to the passage of the twelve trucks "on Wednesday" refers to another newspaper's article of the previous week, so that the Wednesday in question was 30 January, as suggested by Marshall. Marshall's unattributed allusion (page 53) to the directors crossing in their own carriage is not repeated in available contemporary newspaper reports.)

The world's first commercial roll-on/roll-off ferry passage therefore probably took place on 30 January 1850. (Note: And certainly by the date of the periodical, 10 February. Marshall states (page 53) that "It was not until March 1850 that PS Leviathan was plying the Forth ... " possibly following Thomas and Turnock who say (page 70) "It was not until 1 March 1850 that Leviathan entered service ... " but these assertions must be mistaken.)

The Tay ferry crossing came into full operation in May 1851. The innovation transformed the financial situation of the EP&DR, and Bouch's technical designs worked perfectly: when he left the EP&DR to set up in private practice, he was able to state that in thirteen months not a single working day had been lost in the ferry operation.

On Friday 28 March 1851, a special passenger train crossed the Forth and the Tay:

[Harbour improvement works being nearly completed,] the Directors resolved to invite a number of the shareholders to be present at the formal opening of the communication between Ferry-Port and Broughty. Friday being the day fixed upon for the ceremony, the Directors and about 300 of the shareholders accordingly started from Edinburgh at a quarter before nine o'clock morning; and having crossed the Firth in the Company's floating railway [steamship] Leviathan, proceeded, stopping at the various stations, on to Ferry-Port-on-Craig, which they reached about eleven o-clock ... On reaching Ferry-Port-on-Craig they were met by the Directors of the Dundee and Arbroath Railway, with which line a junction has now been formed at Broughty Ferry.

[The works at Ferry-Port] are of a very extensive and substantial kind. The basin, which is now opened ... is a spacious one, being in length about 600 feet, and in breadth 300 feet, with an entrance lock 85 feet in width. Having been excavated to upwards of seven feet below low water of spring tides, it possesses the great advantage of being able to float small vessels even when the water is lowest, and vessels of a large size will generally have sufficient water. ... In order to facilitate the loading of coals ... a staith, similar to one on the Tyne, is in course of erection, by which waggon-loads will be at once discharged into the holds of vessels ...

The Directors and Shareholders having gone over and examined the works, again re-entered their carriages, which were then, by means of a stationary engine, let down the inclined plain, [sic] and along a moveable platform, which can be adjusted to any level by means of a crane, so as to be attached to the deck of the large floating steam railway [ferryboat] "Robert Napier". The rails on the platform and on the deck of the steamer being of the same gauge, and easily adjusted, the carriages, with the passengers seated, were on board in a few moments, when the large floating machine steamed out of the harbour. There was a strong gale blowing [and an adverse tide] but the "Robert Napier" did her duty well, conveying her unusual cargo in about fourteen minutes to the other side. The sensation of sitting in a railway carriage on board of a vessel breasting the turbulent waves was certainly a peculiar one, and the passengers generally enjoyed it. The vessel with her line of carriages (there are rails laid for two lines, but on this occasion there was only one, consisting of six carriages) had a magnificent appearance as she steamed along ...

On reaching Broughty there was a few minutes delay, from the fierceness of the gale preventing the vessel going right into the basin; but the delay was very short, and the carriages with their passengers were then, by means of a moving platform similar to the one on the other side, run on the junction rails. The train was then taken up to the place where the junction with the Dundee and Arbroath Railway is effected—a distance of upwards of a quarter of a mile.

Here, after waiting a few minutes, in order to allow the passengers to see the junction, the train returned to Broughty. Here, after looking at the basin, which is not quite so large as on the opposite side, although with an equal depth of water, the Edinburgh visitors were again taken on board the floating railway in the same manner as they were landed. They were then steamed over to Ferry Port, and from thence on to the line, along which they rattled at a pleasant pace till they reached the Ladybank Junction, where they were entertained to a cold collation. The train shortly afterwards proceeded on its way, and reached Edinburgh in safety in the afternoon ...

We understand that since Friday [28 March 1851] the goods traffic has been conducted by means of the "floating railway" to and from Broughty; but it will yet be two or three weeks before the communication is thoroughly open for passengers, who, in the meantime, have to be conveyed betwixt Ferry Port and Dundee per steamer, as hitherto. (Note: Paying passengers were almost certainly never conveyed on the "floating railway".)

Ferryport-on-Craig station was renamed Tayport on the same day.

The ferryboats were not fast, at 5 knots, and the crossing averaged 56 minutes. As built the vessels were reversible, but it was found that there was a danger of wagons being loaded running off the far end of the boat during the operation, and stop blocks were fixed at one end, converting the boats to single ended working. Some locomotives were transferred from the former EL&GR line to Burntisland, where the company's main workshops had been established. During her first year in service, Leviathan carried 75,000 wagons.

Further vessels were built for the work in later years: PS Carrier, 243 tons entered service in 1858 on the Tay crossing, and PS Balbirnie, 533 tons followed in 1861. After the EP&DR was taken over by the North British Railway, PS Kinloch, 585 tons joined the fleet in 1865, and PS Midlothian, 920 tons, joined in 1881. The passenger ferries were in a separate fleet; although passengers occasionally crossed on the goods boats, and empty passenger coaches were transferred on the ferries, there is no evidence that a through passenger train ferry ever operated.

=== The St Andrews Railway ===
The St Andrews Railway was opened on 1 July 1852 from a junction immediately south of Leuchars to a St Andrews station somewhat to the west of the ancient burgh. It was worked by the EP&DR, and was later absorbed by the North British Railway by the North British Railway (Amalgamations) Act 1877 (40 & 41 Vict. c. lxi) of 1 August 1877, effective in October 1877.

=== The Fife and Kinross Railway and the Kinross-shire Railway ===
The Fife and Kinross Railway, between Ladybank and Kinross, opened on 6 June 1857 on 15 March 1858, was worked by the EP&DR. It amalgamated with the EP&DR by the Edinburgh, Perth and Dundee Railway (Fife and Kinross Amalgamation) Act 1862 (25 & 26 Vict. c. clxxxi) of 29 July 1862.

Edinburgh, Perth and Dundee Railway Act 1861
- Act of Parliament
- Parliament of the United Kingdom
- Long title: An Act to enable the Edinburgh, Perth, and Dundee Railway Company to make Byelaws for their Piers, Basins, and Works at Ferry-port-on-Craig and Broughty, and the Ferry between Ferry-port-on-Craig and Broughty; to vest the Burntisland and Granton Ferry in the Company; to construct Siding Accommodations and Works for Supply of Water; to amalgamate the Kinross-shire Railway with their Undertaking; and for other Purposes.
- Citation: 24 & 25 Vict. c. ccxiv

Dates
- Royal assent: 1 August 1861

The Kinross-shire Railway opened its line on 20 June 1860, running from Lumphinnans, near Cowdenbeath, to Kinross, and traversing an area rich with coalpits. At Kinross it shared a joint station with the Fife and Kinross Railway. It was worked by the EP&DR and was absorbed by it by the Edinburgh, Perth and Dundee Railway Act 1861 (24 & 25 Vict. c. ccxiv) of 1 August 1861.

=== The Leslie Railway ===
Leslie Railway Act 1857
- Act of Parliament
- Parliament of the United Kingdom
- Long title: An Act for making a Railway from the Edinburgh, Perth, and Dundee Railway at Markinch Station to the Town of Leslie, with Branches to Auchmuty Mills, Leven Bank Mill, and Prinlaws Lower Mills, and other Purposes.
- Citation: 20 & 21 Vict. c. lxxxvi

Dates
- Royal assent: 27 July 1857

The independent Leslie Railway was authorised by the Leslie Railway Act 1857 (20 & 21 Vict. c. lxxxvi) and opened its short branch line from Markinch to Leslie on 1 December 1861. It was worked by the EP&DR. It was absorbed into the North British Railway by the North British Railway Act 1872 (35 & 36 Vict. c. cxxiii) of 18 July 1872.

=== Burntisland improvements ===
In the later years of the 1850s, the output of the Fife coalfield expanded considerably, and a great deal of the mineral went for export from east coast ports. Chief among these was Burntisland, expanded from its original role as a simple ferryport. Congestion there became a major source of complaint, and late in 1860 a major expansion of the dock facilities was commissioned. A sheltered dock area of 20 acres had been provided at a cost of £10,000.

=== Absorbed by the North British Railway ===
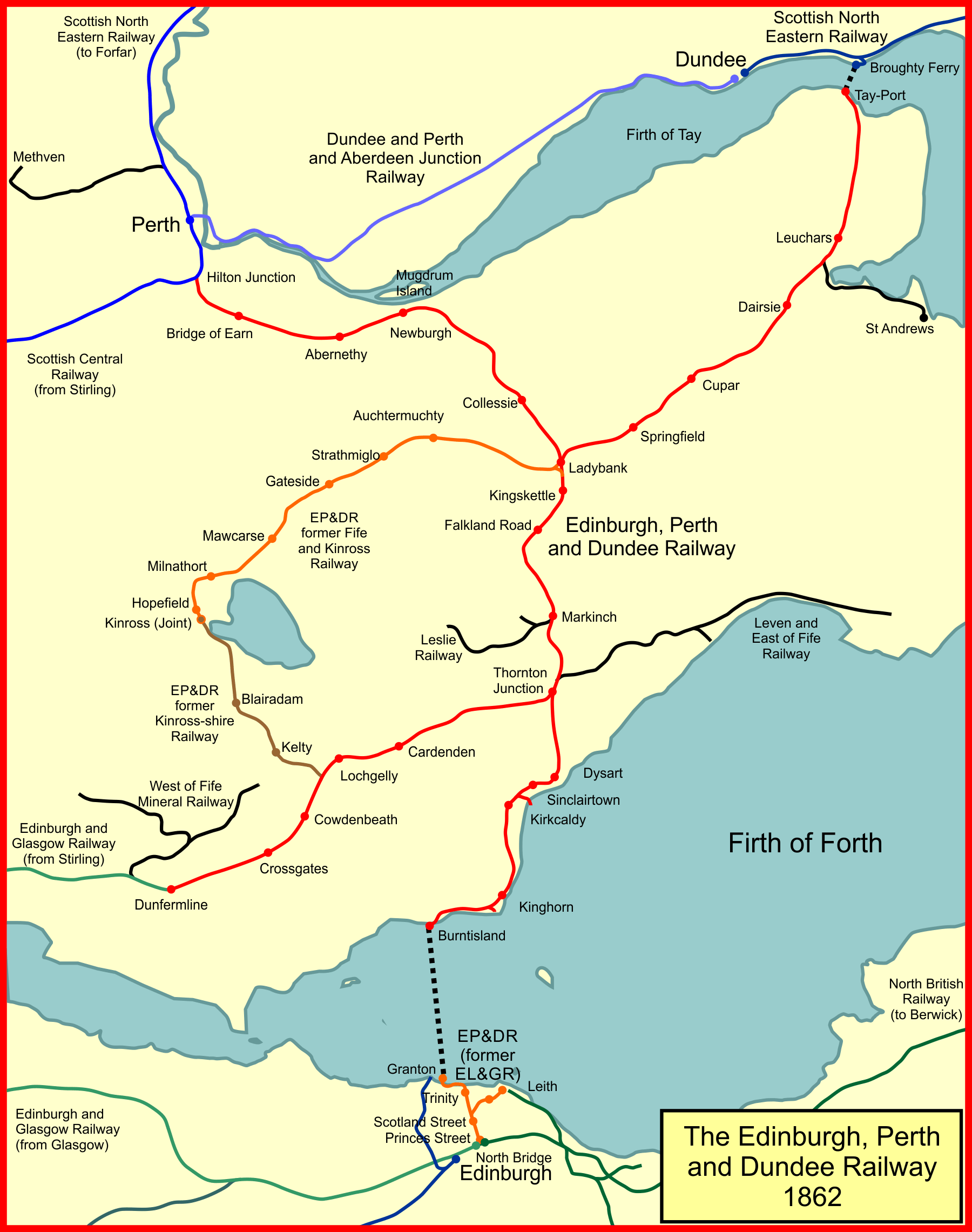
The Edinburgh, Perth and Dundee Railway system in 1862

The North British Railway (NBR) had started out with the intention of making a link with the growing English railway network via Berwick, which it achieved in 1848. As time went on, it adopted an aggressive expansionist policy, absorbing local railways and widening its network. An approach had been made in November 1859 to establish collaborative working arrangements between the two companies, but although the meeting was amicable, the NBR had other priorities at the time.

In 1861-1862 the EP&DR was undergoing a financial crisis and was unable to pay a dividend. Negotiations with the NBR followed, and an absorption was agreed. Some EP&DR shareholders were unhappy with what they considered poor terms, but the truth was that their company had run out of money. On 29 July 1862 (Note: Ross page 57; Marshall says 1 August.) the North British, Edinburgh, Perth and Dundee and West of Fife Railways Amalgamation Act 1862 (25 & 26 Vict. c. clxxxix) authorised the arrangement.

=== Development of the former E&NR network ===
The NBR was constructing piece by piece a through route from Berwick to Aberdeen, and the EP&DR was a useful part of that nascent route. However the two ferry crossings were a liability, particularly as the rival Scottish Central Railway had a useful route from Edinburgh to Perth via Stirling, and also captured Glasgow traffic. The Scottish Central was absorbed by the Caledonian Railway in 1865, and it became plain that a fight was on.

In addition the E&NR route gave access to the West Fife and East Fife coalfields, directly and by means of a number of branch lines; a considerable network developed in Fife over the remainder of the nineteenth century.

The access at Edinburgh (on the former Edinburgh, Leith and Newhaven Railway) was obviously unsatisfactory, involving a departure on a rope worked incline through the tunnel to Scotland Street, and the North British Railway set about provided a better alternative; this involved a new branch line leaving the Berwick line east of Edinburgh near Abbeyhill and rejoining the line to Granton near Trinity. This opened for traffic on 2 March 1868.

=== First attempt at a Forth Bridge ===
Bridging the Forth was an essential first step, and with engineering expertise provided by Thomas Bouch, and design was provided and work started. the location was not at Queensferry where the present-day Forth Bridge stands, but about 3 miles (5 km) west of that location, crossing from Blackness to Charlestown. The Forth is actually somewhat wider here than at Queensferry.

On 14 June 1866 the first pier (Note: Presumably a caisson.) of the new bridge was towed into position. In subsequent days it was loaded with scrap iron to cause it to sink to a firm bed, but on 3 August 1866 the board of the NBR sent instructions to cease work; the contractors were discharged. The NBR had itself run into serious financial difficulty and the directors themselves were in turmoil. Thomas has a different account:

"Bouch had built an experimental iron cylinder at Burntisland, which was to be used in the building of a 3-mile-long (4.8 km) bridge across the Forth at Charlestown. The cylinder was placed in position on Sunday 6 November 1864." "[The scheme] depended on a substantial infusion of North British money, and the 1866 financial crisis forced a halt to all bridge plans".

=== Burntisland expansion, again ===
The continued increase in coal production in West Fife and East Fife coalfields again overwhelmed capacity to handle the traffic at Burntisland, to which the North British Railway directed much of it. Captain Randolph Wemyss of the Wemyss Estate, proprietors of the Wemyss Private Railway repeatedly urged investment at Methil Dock, which was also heavily congested, but for some time the North British Railway insisted on regarding Burntisland as the primary objective of any development, while (in the view of Wemyss and many coal-owners) not actually spending any money to do so. Finally in December 1876 a very large improvement scheme at Burntisland was inaugurated, resolving the impasse. Hydraulic hoists enabled 1,000 tons of coal to be loaded to ships every hour; the previous system had involved hand-operated cranes.

The increase in the coal trade continued exponentially, and a further expansion at Burntisland was commissioned in 1901; it covered 43 acres and could handle vessels up to 7,000 tons.

=== The Tay Bridge ===
The original Edinburgh and Northern Railway route was always the spine of a through route to Dundee and Aberdeen, and if the intended Forth Bridge had been abandoned, the dream of a Tay Bridge at Dundee was brought to life, once again with the expertise of Thomas Bouch. Construction began in 1871 and the bridge opened in 1878. As part of the work, a new section of line approaching the bridge on the south side, was opened by the North British Railway from Leuchars to Wormit and the Tay Bridge. In addition a short section of line was opened on the north side of the Tay, giving access to North British Railway trains to the north shore lines. The route to Tayport became a backwater branch line and the railway ferry from Tayport to Broughty was discontinued. The fortunes of the North British Railway were transformed in the area, and regular travel between Fife and Dundee increased considerably.

The following year, on 28 December 1879, part of the bridge collapsed during a violent storm, taking a passenger train down with it; 74 or 75 persons perished in what is known as the Tay Bridge disaster.

Preparations were in hand for resuming the work on Bouch's Forth Bridge, but as his culpability for the collapse of the Tay Bridge became well known, his Forth Bridge could not continue. The human tragedy was paramount, but it was also a blow for the North British Railway; during its short lifetime the Tay Bridge had enabled the NBR to elevate its share of Dundee traffic (Note: Marshall, page 69, presumably meaning "from Fife".) to 85%; with the bridge gone this fell to 51%.

The route to Dundee from Fife was crucial to the success of the north British Railway, and despite the serious setback, it set about the construction of a second Tay Bridge. This was to be double track, and it opened on 14 June 1887 for goods traffic, and to passenger trains on 20 June 1887.

=== The Forth Bridge ===
The ferry crossing of the Firth of Forth continued to be a major barrier to the success of the North British Railway route to the north east of Scotland. The project to make a crossing near Queensferry gathered momentum, and in 1881 the Forth Bridge Railway Committee was established. When the bridge was constructed, the NBR contributed 35% of the cost; the English Midland Railway contributed 30%, the North Eastern Railway 17.5% and the Great Northern Railway 17.5%.

The Forth Bridge was opened on 4 March 1890, crossing from Dalmeny to North Queensferry. Railway branch lines had already been built to the respective shore locations in connection with the long-standing ferry, but these were unsuitable to form part of a trunk main line. The North British Railway built a new direct line from Saughton Junction (a few miles west of Edinburgh) to Dalmeny and from Inverkeithing (immediately north of North Queensferry) to Burntisland. The Granton to Burntisland ferry was discontinued and Burntisland became a wayside location on the new through route.

=== Later development ===
Accordingly in 1890 the North British Railway achieved its aim of having a direct land route from Edinburgh to Dundee. Developments had also taken place on the north side of the Tay, and the NBR had access to a through route from Dundee on to Arbroath, Montrose and Aberdeen, although much of that was jointly owned with the rival Caledonian Railway or over that company's lines by the exercise of running powers.

=== The twentieth century ===
In 1923 the North British Railway was a constituent of the new London and North Eastern Railway, by the Railways Act 1921, and in 1948 the railways of Great Britain were nationalised, the former EP&DR lines forming part of the Scottish Region of British Railways.

In the 1960s rationalisation of the railways resulted in closure of many routes. The original route to Tayport had not served a main traffic flow since the opening of the Tay Bridge in 1887, and it was closed. The original route from Burntisland to Ladybank (later connected to Wormit) was retained and continues to form part of the main line from Edinburgh to Dundee. The "Perth branch" from Ladybank to Hilton Junction remained in use but the passenger service was reduced to minimal levels, with the dominant passenger routing between Edinburgh and Perth being taken by Falkirk and Stirling. In recent (2015) years a frequent passenger service has been restored.

== Topography ==
Dundee main line:

- Burntisland; opened 20 September 1847; relocated to make through station 1890;
- Petticur Harbour branch connection 1849 - ?;
- Kinghorn; opened 20 September 1847;
- Invertiel Junction; divergence of line to Foulford Junction, near Cowdenbeath 1896 - 1960;
- Kirkcaldy; opened 20 September 1847;
- Kirkcaldy Harbour connection 1848 - 1960;
- Sinclairtown; opened 20 September 1847; closed except for workmen 1 January 1917; reopened 1 February 1919; closed 6 October 1969;
- Dysart; opened 20 September 1847; closed 6 October 1969;
- Thornton South Junction; divergence of spur towards Dunfermline 1878 - ?;
- Thornton; opened 4 September 1848; renamed Thornton Junction by 1850; closed 6 October 1969; convergence of Edinburgh and Northern branch from Dunfermline from 1848, and of Wemyss and Buckhaven Railway 1881 - 1963;
- Thornton North Junction; divergence of Leven Railway from 1854, later line to Fife Coast Railway;
- Markinch; opened 20 September 1847; occasionally known as Markinch Junction; convergence of Leslie Railway 1861 - 1967;
- Falkland Road; opened 20 September 1847; closed 15 September 1958;
- Kingskettle; opened 20 September 1847; closed 1 January 1917; opened 1 February 1919; closed 4 September 1967;
- Ladybank South Junction; divergence of spur towards Fife and Kinross Railway 1857 - 1957;
- Ladybank; opened 20 September 1847; occasionally known as Ladybank Junction; divergence of Perth branch and convergence of Fife and Kinross Railway line;
- Springfield; opened 20 September 1847;
- Cupar; opened 20 September 1847;
- Dairsie; opened 17 May 1848; closed 20 September 1954;
- Leuchars; opened 1 June 1878 as Leuchars Junction; convergence of line from St Andrews 1852 - 1969;renamed Leuchars 1970;
- Leuchars Junction; divergence of present-day line to Tay Bridge from 1878; original line from here to Tayport now closed;
- Leuchars; opened 17 May 1848; renamed Leuchars Junction 1 July 1852; closed 1 June 1878; re-opened 1 December 1878 as Leuchars Old; closed 3 October 1921;
- Ferry-Port-on-Craig; opened 17 May 1848; renamed Tayport (Tay Port at first) 1851; relocated to suit extension of line to Wormit 12 May 1879; closed 22 May 1966.

Perth branch:

- Ladybank; above;
- Collessie; opened 20 September 1847; closed 19 September 1955;
- Glenburnie Junction; convergence of Newburgh and North Fife line 1909 - 1960 / 1964;
- Glenburnie; opened 9 December 1847 as temporary terminus; closed 17 May 1848;
- Newburgh; opened 17 May 1848; closed 19 September 1955;
- Abernethy Road; opened 17 May 1848 as temporary terminus; closed 25 July 1848;
- Abernethy; opened 25 July 1848; closed 19 September 1955;
- Bridge of Earn; opened 25 July 1848; closed 1 February 1892;
- Bridge of Earn; opened 1 February 1892; located to accommodate the Glenfarg line at the junction 1890 - 1970; closed 15 June 1964;
- Hilton Junction; convergence with Scottish Central Railway line.

Dunfermline branch: closed between Dunfermline and Townhill Junction:

- Dunfermline; opened 13 December 1849; end on connection with Stirling and Dunfermline Railway 1849 - 1993; renamed Dunfermline Upper 1890; closed 7 October 1968;
- Touch North Junction; divergence of spur towards Inverkeithing 1890 - 1970;
- Townhill Junction; convergence of line from Inverkeithing from 1866; divergence of line to Lilliehill Junction 1880 - 1976;
- Crossgates; opened 4 September 1848; closed 26 September 1949;
- Cowdenbeath South Junction; divergence of line towards Kinross-shire Railway from 1890; line from here to Lumphinnans Central Junction now closed (from 31 March 1919);
- Cowdenbeath; opened 4 September 1848; renamed Cowdenbeath Old 1890; closed 31 March 1919 (and replaced by station on deviation line);
- Foulford Junction; divergence of line to Inverteil Junction 1896 - 1962;
- Lumphinnans Central Junction; convergence of 1919 connection from Cowdenbeath second station; divergence of line to Kinross-shire Railway 1860 - 1957;
- Lumphinnans East Junction; convergence of line from Kinross-shire Railway 1902 - 1967;
- Lochgelly; opened 4 September 1848;
- Glencraig Junction; convergence of line from Glencraig Colliery and Craighead Colliery, 1898 - 1968;
- Cardenden; opened 4 September 1848;
- Redford Junction; convergence of line from Kinglassie Colliery, 1925;
- Glenrothes with Thornton; opened 11 May 1992;
- Thornton West Junction; divergence of south curve towards Kirkcaldy; divergence of spur line towards Wemyss Estate Railway;
- Thornton; above.

Gradients leaving Burntisland involved a climb for over five miles (8 km) including one mile (1.6 km) at 1 in 128; from Kirkcaldy gradients of 1 in 143, 105, 100 and 114 followed, and there was then a steep downhill run from Dysart to Thornton; from there climbing resumed at 1 in 129 and 104 to Markinch. After Markinch there was a further climb at 1 in 102 and then a fall at 1 in 105, a climb at 1 in 95 immediately following, and then at 111. From Ladybank to Tay-Port there were no gradients of any significance.
