= Dunfermline railway station =

Dunfermline railway station can refer to one of several railway stations in the town of Dunfermline, Scotland:

- Dunfermline City railway station, on the Dunfermline and Queensferry Railway
- Dunfermline Upper, where the Stirling and Dunfermline Railway and Dunfermline Branch of Edinburgh and Northern Railway met (closed)
- Dunfermline Queen Margaret, opened in 2000.
