= Inverkeithing railway station =

Railway station in Fife, Scotland

Inverkeithing Scottish Gaelic: Inbhir Chèitinn
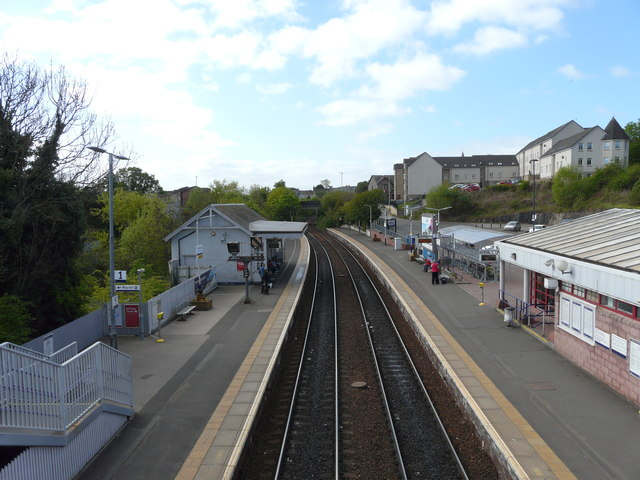
- Looking south from the station footbridge

General information
- Location: Inverkeithing, Fife; Scotland
- Coordinates: 56.0351°N 3.3954°W
- Grid reference: NT131833
- Managed by: ScotRail
- Platforms: 2

Other information
- Station code: INK

Key dates
- 1 November 1877: Opened

Passengers
- 2020/21: ▼0.156 million
- Interchange: ▼9,986
- 2021/22: ▲0.645 million
- Interchange: ▲42,237
- 2022/23: ▲0.746 million
- Interchange: ▼32,181
- 2023/24: ▲0.873 million
- Interchange: ▲43,448
- 2024/25: ▲0.953 million
- Interchange: ▲44,854
Location
Notes
- Passenger statistics from the Office of Rail and Road

Inverkeithing railway station serves the town of Inverkeithing in Fife, Scotland. The station is managed by ScotRail and is on the Fife Circle Line, 10 miles (16 km) north west of Edinburgh Waverley. The station is popular with commuters travelling to Edinburgh from Fife and beyond, thanks to its location beside the M90 motorway.

The station is served by ScotRail, LNER, CrossCountry and Caledonian Sleeper services. South of Inverkeithing the line continues towards Edinburgh via the nearby Forth Bridge, and north of the station, the Fife Circle Line splits in two - the main line continuing along the coast via Aberdour whilst the branch heads inland via Dunfermline.

== History ==
It opened in 1877, at the same time as the tracks of the Dunfermline and Queensferry Railway. In the 1880s, it was taken over by the North British Railway, and reopened in 1890 as a more significant double-track station on the approach to the newly built Forth Bridge.

== Facilities ==
Two large free of charge park and ride car parks are provided: Belleknowes car park and King Street car park. A third car park, Chapel Place Car Park, has electric vehicle charging points.

The station is currently staffed for all trains and has public toilets and a wheelchair accessible footbridge. The station provides a large free bike storage area.

The ticket office is located in a modern station building on the northbound platform, while a traditional North British Railway building survives on the southbound platform, where it serves as a waiting room.

== Services ==
Journey times as low as 15 minutes are available to Edinburgh Haymarket as London North Eastern Railway and ScotRail express services between Edinburgh and Aberdeen stop here. Some services between Edinburgh and Inverness also stop at Inverkeithing.

Monday to Saturday, 1 tph operates to Leven via Kirkcaldy, 1 tph operates to Leven via Dunfermline, 1 tph operates to Dundee, 1 tph operates to Cowdenbeath via Dunfermline, 1 tph operates to Perth and roughly 5 tph operate to Edinburgh. Limited Aberdeen ScotRail services additionally stop here on the early morning and late evening services.

On Sundays, 1 tph operates to Leven via Kirkcaldy, 1 tph operates to Leven via Dunfermline, 1 tph operates to Dundee and 1 tph operates to Aberdeen. Roughly 4-5 tph operate to Edinburgh.

London North Eastern Railway services between Aberdeen, London King's Cross and Leeds call at Inverkeithing.

As of May 2025, CrossCountry also operate one train a day to Aberdeen and one train per day to Plymouth.

Preceding station	National Rail	Following station
Haymarket	London North Eastern Railway; Northern Lights (London Kings Cross – Aberdeen)	Kirkcaldy
Haymarket	CrossCountry; 1 a day (Plymouth - Aberdeen)	Kirkcaldy
Haymarket	ScotRail; Edinburgh–Dundee line	Kirkcaldy
North Queensferry	ScotRail; Fife Circle Line	Dalgety Bay
North Queensferry	ScotRail; Fife Circle Line	Rosyth
Edinburgh Waverley	Caledonian Sleeper; Highland Caledonian Sleeper (London Euston – Aberdeen)	Kirkcaldy
