= Charlestown railway station =

Charlestown railway station may refer to:

- Charlestown railway station (ER), on the Elgin Railway in Scotland
- Charlestown railway station (Ireland), in County Mayo, Ireland
- Charlestown (KL) railway station, on the Kincardine Line in Scotland

== See also ==
- Charlestown (disambiguation)
- Charleston station (disambiguation)
