= Crossgates railway station (Fife) =

Disused railway station in Crossgates, Fife

Crossgates
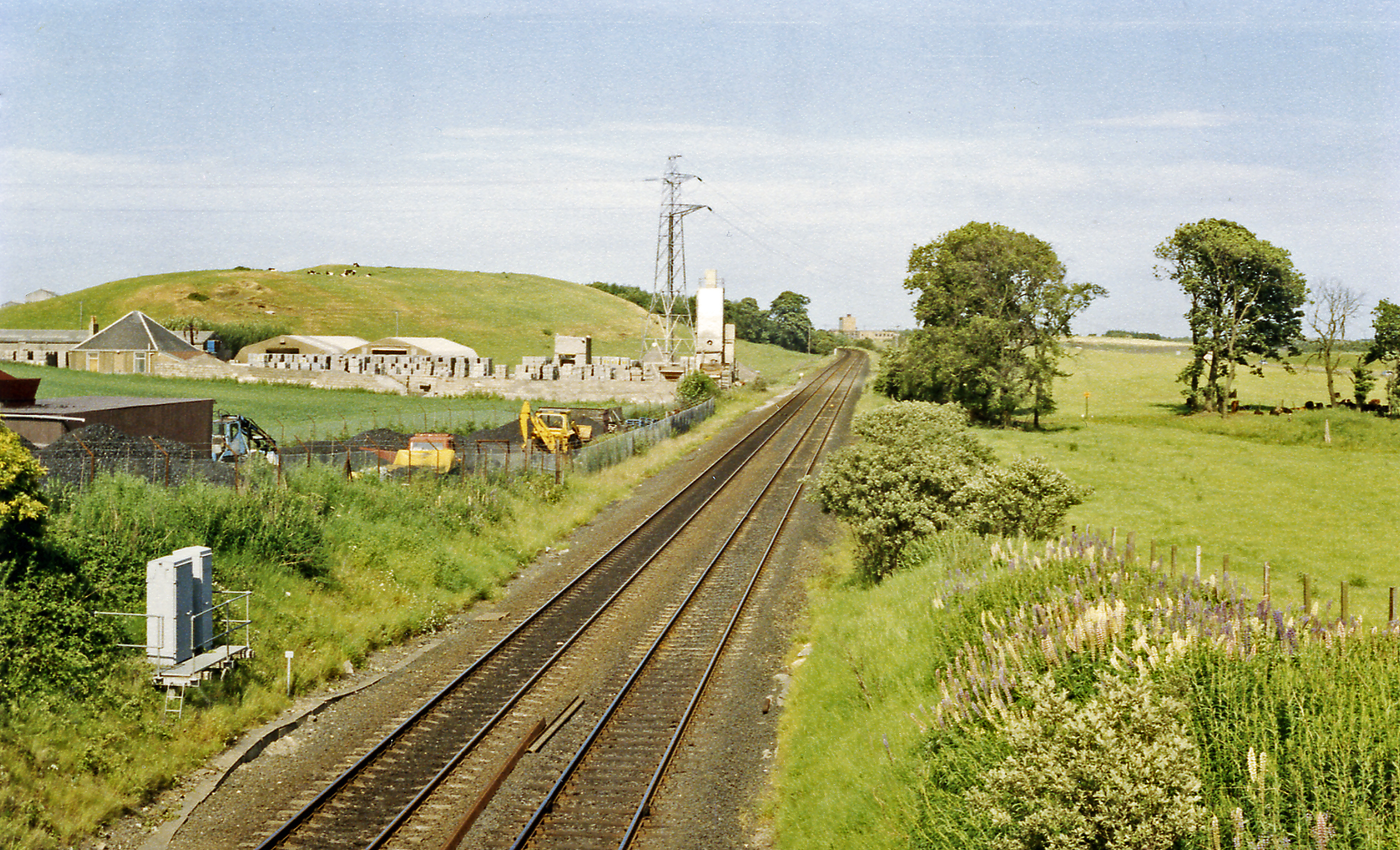
- The site of the station, looking northeast towards Thornton Junction, in 1988

General information
- Location: Crossgates, Fife; Scotland
- Coordinates: 56.091°N 3.3715°W
- Grid reference: NT147895
- Platforms: 2

Other information
- Status: Disused

History
- Original company: Edinburgh and Northern Railway
- Pre-grouping: Edinburgh, Perth and Dundee Railway; North British Railway
- Post-grouping: London, Midland and Scottish Railway; British Railways (Scottish Region)

Key dates
- 4 September 1848: Opened as Crossgates
- 1 July 1923: Name changed to Crossgates Fife
- 26 September 1949: Closed
Location

Crossgates Fife railway station co-served the village of Crossgates, Fife, Scotland, from 1848 to 1949 on the Edinburgh and Northern Railway.

== History ==
The station was opened as Crossgates on 4 September 1848 by the Edinburgh and Northern Railway. It was originally a terminus until Dunfermline Upper opened on 13 December 1849. The station building and the signal box were on the westbound platform and the goods yard was on the north side, which served Mossend Iron Foundry. The station's name was changed to Crossgates Fife on 1 July 1923 to avoid confusion with the station of the same name in Yorkshire. The station closed on 26 September 1949.

Preceding station	Historical railways	Following station
Halbeath; Line open, station closed	Edinburgh and Northern Railway	Cowdenbeath Old; Line and station closed
