= North Queensferry railway station =

Railway station in Fife, Scotland

North Queensferry Scottish Gaelic: Port na Banrighinn
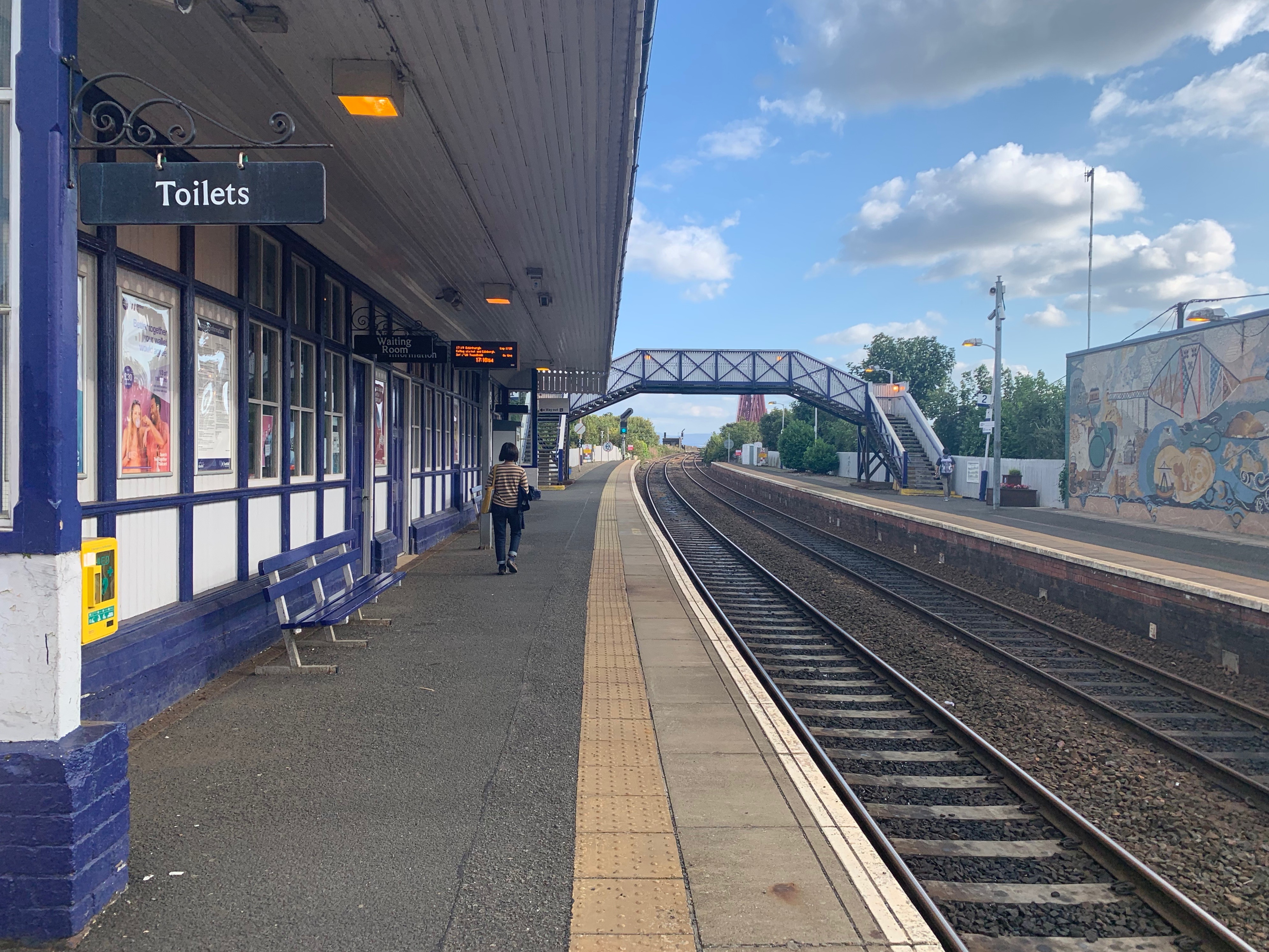
- View south towards the Forth Bridge

General information
- Location: North Queensferry, Fife; Scotland
- Coordinates: 56.0124°N 3.3947°W
- Grid reference: NT131808
- Managed by: ScotRail
- Platforms: 2

Other information
- Station code: NQU

Key dates
- 1 July 1890: Station opened

Passengers
- 2020/21: ▼25,274
- 2021/22: ▲86,826
- 2022/23: ▲98,514
- 2023/24: ▲0.118 million
- 2024/25: ▲0.122 million
Location
Notes
- Passenger statistics from the Office of Rail and Road

North Queensferry railway station is a railway station in the village of North Queensferry, Fife, Scotland. The station is managed by ScotRail and is on the Fife Circle Line, 11 1/4 miles (18.1 km) northwest of Edinburgh Waverley.

== History ==
Although the station was not in service by the time of the opening of the Forth Bridge in March 1890, it was opened on 1 July 1890. The station replaced the station at North Queensferry Pier, which had been opened in 1877 to take passengers to and from the ferry across the Forth.

The station has been unstaffed since 1990, following the closure of its ticket office. The original wooden Victorian station building is still standing and its design is unique to the area.

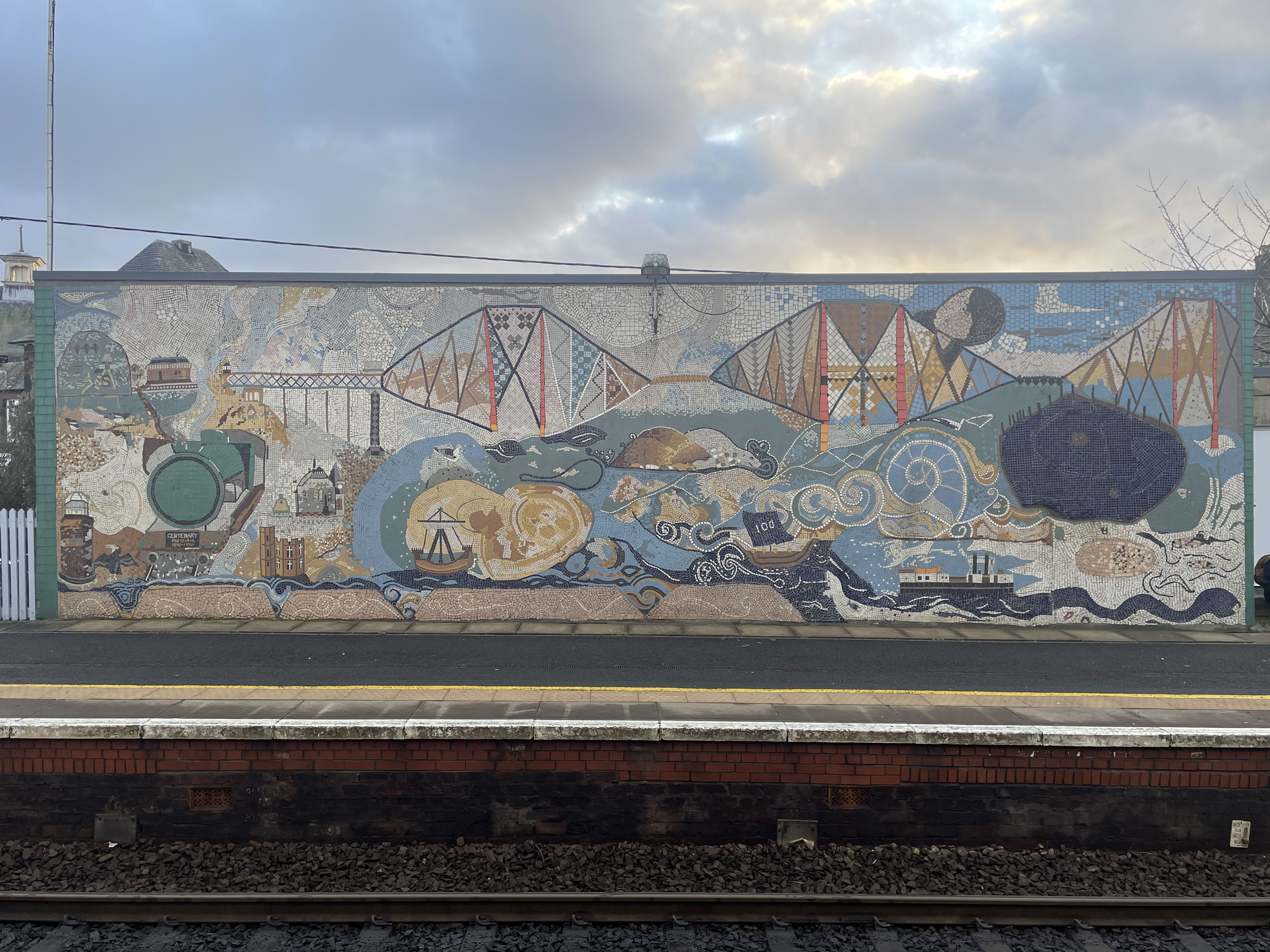
The mosaic at the station

To celebrate the Forth Bridge Centenary in 1990, a large mosaic depicting the bridge and the local area, created entirely by local residents, was unveiled at the station on Platform 2. The mosaic is now a well-known landmark on the Fife Circle line.

== Services ==
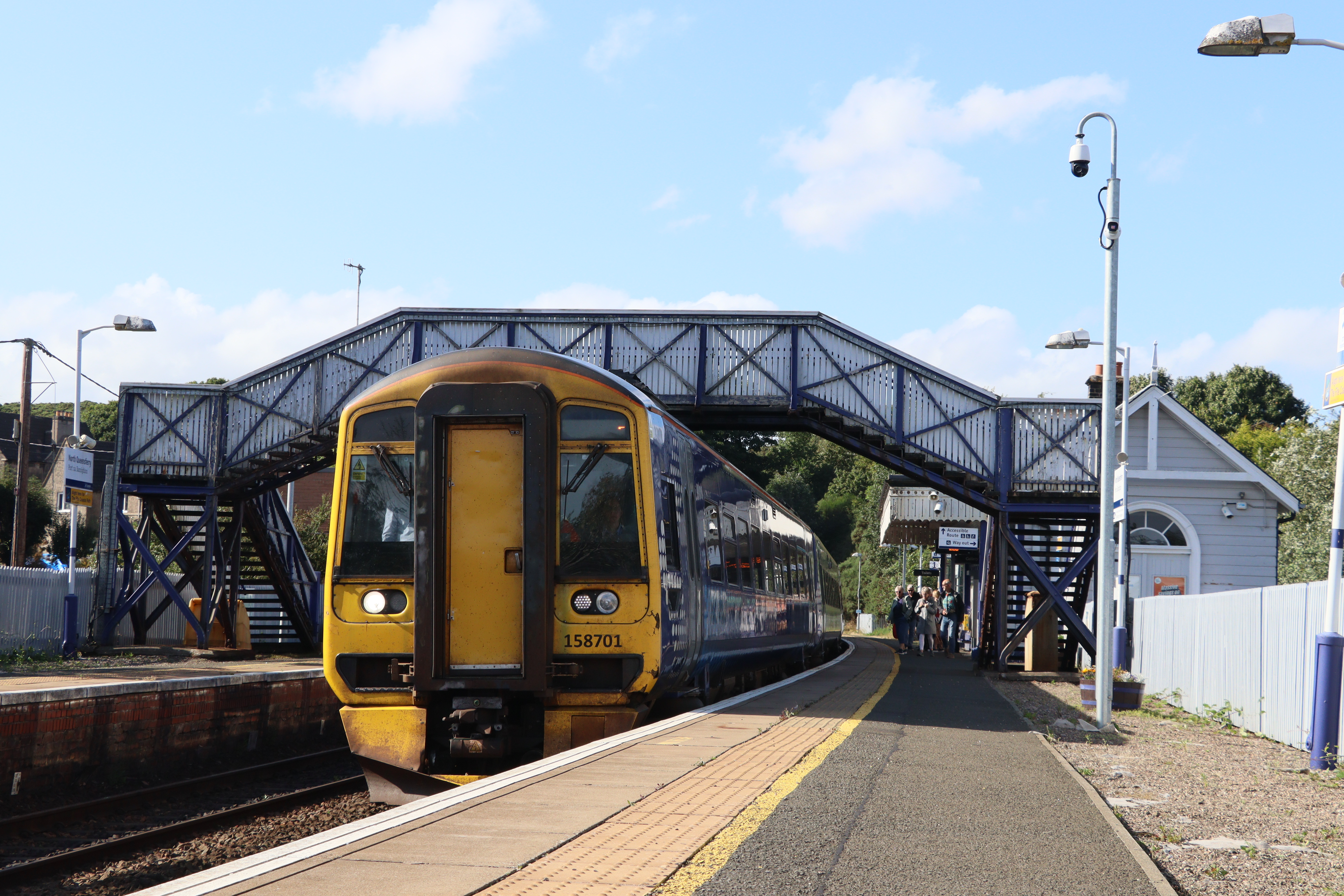
A ScotRail Class 158 at North Queensferry

Monday to Saturday daytimes four trains per hour go to Haymarket and onwards to Edinburgh Waverley southbound. Four trains per hour head towards northbound Inverkeithing and the Fife Circle. Of these, two run the full length of the circular route to Glenrothes with Thornton (one "clockwise" via Dunfermline, the other "anti-clockwise" via Kirkcaldy), one runs to Glenrothes via the coast and then terminates there and the other runs via Dunfermline to terminate at Cowdenbeath.

Evenings and Sundays two trains per hour go to Edinburgh Waverley and two along the Fife Circle, one via Dunfermline and the other via Kirkcaldy.

Preceding station	National Rail	Following station
Dalmeny	ScotRail; Fife Circle Line	Inverkeithing
