= Humbug Park =

Sports venue in Fife, Scotland

Humbug Park Crossgates Greyhound Stadium
- Location within Fife
- Location: Inverkeithing Road; Crossgates; Fife
- Coordinates: 56.081722°N 3.376694°W
- Owner: Fife Council
- Operator: Crossgates Primrose
- Capacity: 2,000
- Surface: Grass
- Opened: 1911

Tenants
- Crossgates Thistle (1911–1916); Crossgates Primrose (1926–1960, 1983–present); Greyhound racing (1937–1953)

Humbug Park also previously known as Crossgates Greyhound Stadium is a football ground and former greyhound racing track, on Inverkeithing Road in Crossgates, Fife, Scotland.

== Origins ==
The name Humbug Park derives from a disused pit of the former Cuttlehill Colliery on which the ground is located.

== Football ==
The ground is the home to Crossgates Primrose, a Scottish football club who play in the East of Scotland League.

== Greyhound racing ==
In 1938, a greyhound promoter with ties to Kirkcaldy Greyhound Stadium, called Thomas Scott, took out a 15-year lease and made extensive alterations to the stadium, including the installation of lighting and the erection of a covered enclosure. The first race meeting is believed to have been held on 19 June.

The racing distance was 275 yards and the racing took place regularly between 1937 until 1953. The track was independent (unlicensed) and took place on Friday and Saturday evenings and had a large mining community following.

In 1945, Scott applied for betting facilities for the 5,000 capacity venue, under the Betting and Lotteries Act 1934.
