= SVFC =

SVFC can refer to one of the following Scottish association football clubs:

- Saltcoats Victoria F.C.
- Steelend Victoria F.C.
- Stonehouse Violet F.C.
