= Halbeath railway station =

Disused railway station in Halbeath, Fife

Halbeath
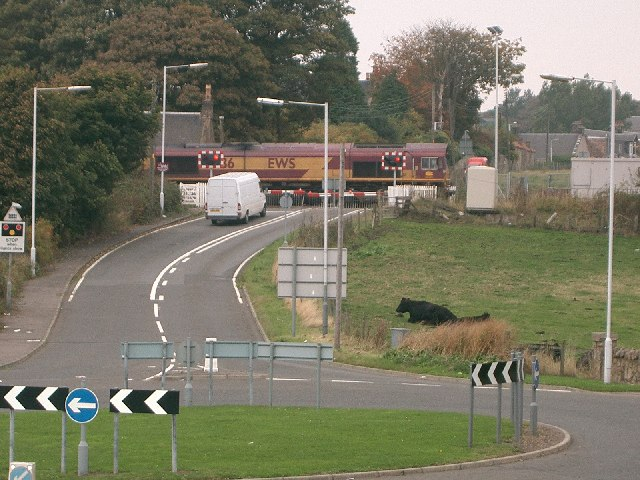
- The level crossing in 2005

General information
- Location: Halbeath, Fife; Scotland
- Coordinates: 56.0839°N 3.4051°W
- Grid reference: NT126887
- Platforms: 2

Other information
- Status: Disused

History
- Original company: Edinburgh and Northern Railway
- Pre-grouping: North British Railway
- Post-grouping: London and North Eastern Railway

Key dates
- Feb. 1850: Opened
- 1 January 1917: Closed
- 1 April 1919: Reopened
- 22 September 1930: Closed permanently
Location

Halbeath railway station served the village of Halbeath, Fife, Scotland, from 1850 to 1930 on the Dunfermline Branch.

== History ==
The station was opened in Feb. 1850 by the Edinburgh and Northern Railway. To the east of the level crossing was the goods yard and the signal box and on the eastbound platform was the station building. To the north was Halbeath Colliery, which was accessed by the Halbeath Waggonway to the east. The station closed on 1 January 1917 but it reopened on 1 April 1919, before closing permanently on 22 September 1930.

In 2026 the Scottish green party stated in their manifesto that they would put forth a proposal to reopen the station to help the environment and better connect communities.

Preceding station	Historical railways	Following station
Crossgates (Fife); Line open, station closed	North British Railway; Dunfermline Branch	Dunfermline Upper; Line open, station closed
