= Mineral railways of Dunfermline =

Former mineral railways in Scotland

Several mineral railways were constructed around Dunfermline in western Fife, Scotland, in the eighteenth century and later. Their purpose was to convey minerals to market from the outcropping coal deposits that had encouraged industrial activity in the area from an early date.

Several waggonways were built: the Fordell Railway, the Elgin Railway, the Halbeath Railway and others, with the objective of connecting collieries and quarries with harbours on the Firth of Forth. The Elgin Railway carried passengers from 1833 and formed the core of the Charlestown Railway and Harbour company, and finally in 1856 the West of Fife Mineral Railway was founded to build new lines. The Charleston and West of Fife companies combined to form the West of Fife Railway and Harbour.

All the lines have ceased to exist, except that a short section of the Charlestown line forms part of the Inverkeithing to Dunfermline line.

== Background, limestone and coal ==
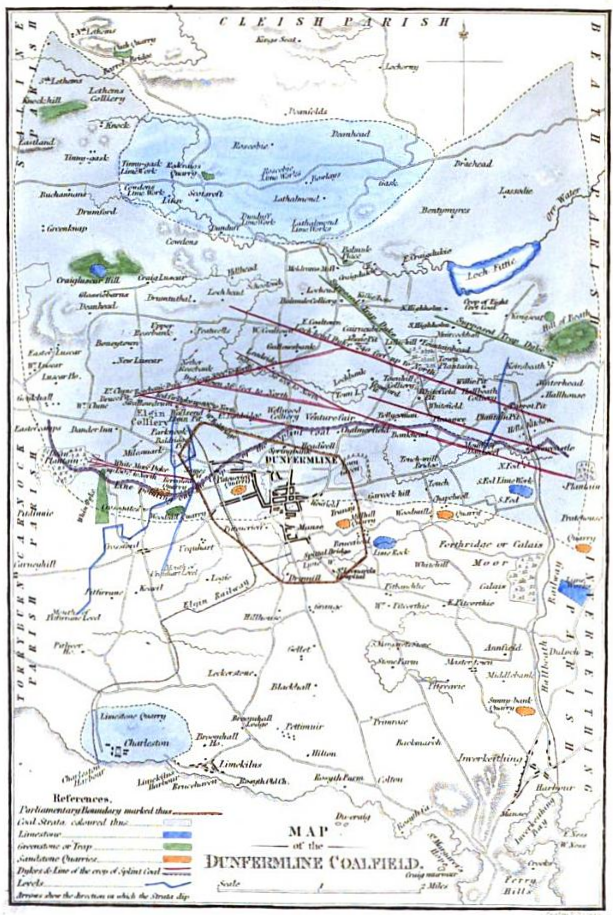
The Dunfermline coalfield in 1847

Coal deposits had been worked in the area close to the Fife coast for centuries. Coal had been important in the manufacture of lime, and of salt, both of which required huge quantities of coal. Transport of heavy minerals before the era when roads had been properly made was expensive, and most minerals were carried on the backs of pack horses. The expense of even a short transit hugely increased the cost of the product.

Proximity to water enabled boat transportation, and therefore mineral deposits close to the Firth were favoured, and were exploited first. Coal outcrops were worked since the fourteenth century, in shallow pits but as these were worked out, the workings had to move further away from water and transport became more difficult.

In the eighteenth century much of the limestone from the area around Dunfermline was exported through Brucehaven, near Limekilns, but as the agricultural revolution gathered pace the demand for lime to improve land also accelerated.

Before the era of the Liverpool and Manchester Railway in the 1830s, many collieries used wooden waggonways to move the mineral. By the eighteenth century these had achieved a degree of sophistication with proper guidance systems, and flanged wheels on the waggons had become widespread, although not universal. These waggonways were developed principally on Tyneside, and in Shropshire, and the technology was disseminated at first from those places.

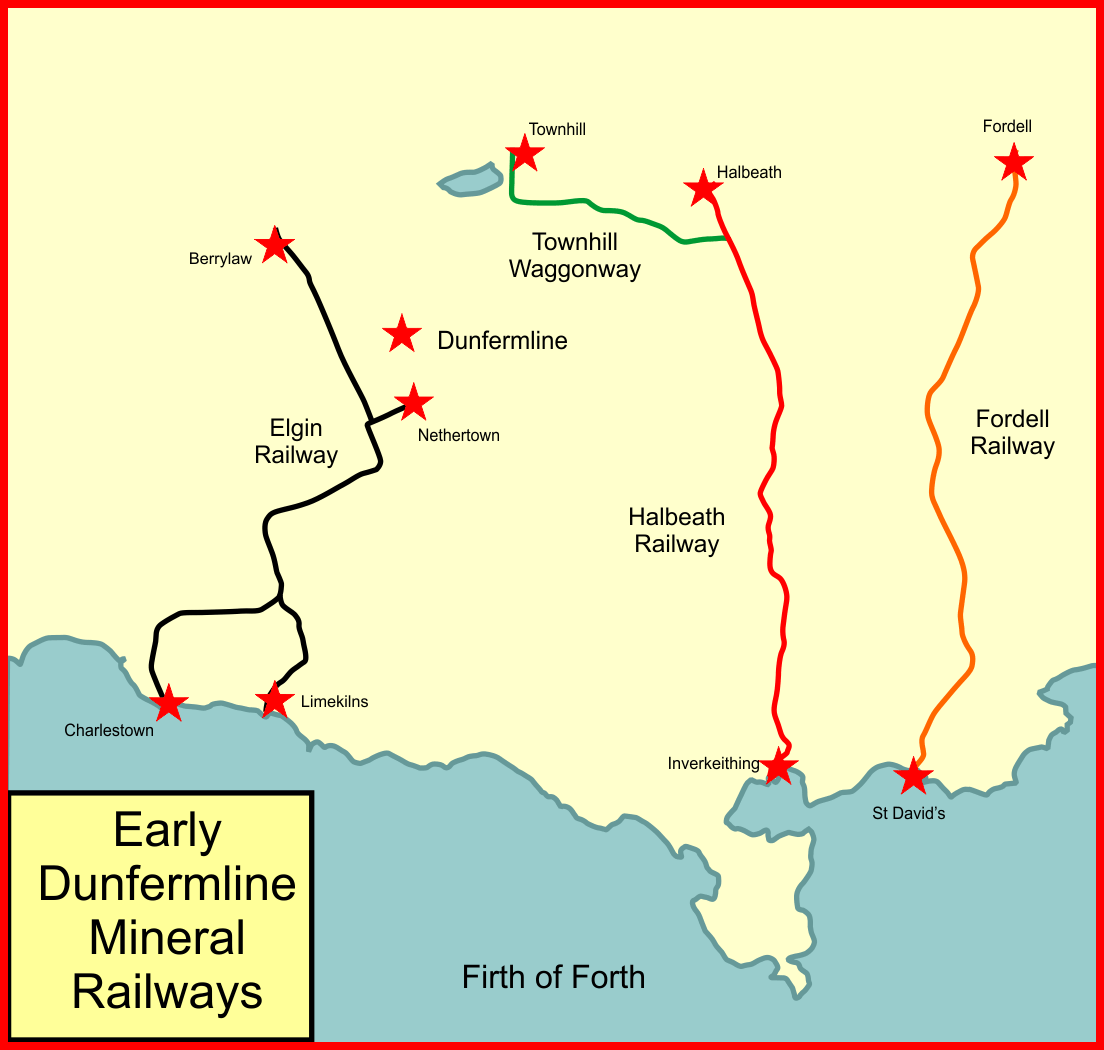
Early Dunfermline mineral railways

Three large waggonway networks were established by landowners to exploit coal and limestone deposits in their estates during this period; their systems were each referred to as railways, and they all continued into the modern railway era.

== The Fordell Railway ==
The Fordell Railway had an unbroken operational existence of 180 years. It ran to St David's Harbour, about 1 mile (1.6 km) east of Inverkeithing, from pits and quarries north of the harbour, and it was eventually extended northwards nearly to Cowdenbeath.

The Henderson family had owned extensive lands in the area since time immemorial, and coal had been worked since the sixteenth century. It was dug from outcrops at the surface, and was taken away by boat. As the outcrops became exhausted, overlying strata further from the coast had to be worked, and transport of the mineral to market was a significant challenge. The coal was carried in panniers on pack horses to a gathering point near Fordell Castle, and there by a coal road to Inverkeithing Harbour.

In 1752 Sir Robert Henderson, the fourth baronet, acquired lands on the Firth of Forth about one mile (1.6 km) east of Inverkeithing, and he constructed a harbour there. It became known as St David's harbour. Salt pans were established there and the coal road was extended to St David's. Vessels up to 600 tons could berth there.

About 1770 Henderson had a wooden waggonway built to connect the pits and quarries to the harbour. It was four miles (6.4 km) in extent. The waggonway followed the design principles of the Tyneside waggonways.

The track gauge was 4 ft 4 in (1,321 mm) and the gradients were steep: as much as 1 in 13 (76.9 ‰) near Vantage. The wooden permanent way was laid with two timber beams making a rail, fir underneath and beech above; wood sleepers were at 2-foot (610 mm) intervals. The rails were 10 to 11 feet (3.0 to 3.4 m) in length, secured to each other and the sleepers by oak pins. The line was a single line throughout. (Note: This form of construction was often referred to as "the double road", referring to the two layers of timber, not the modern connotation of double track.)

John Henderson succeeded to the baronetcy on 19 October 1781 and he continued to improve the coal workings, constructing a prodigious drainage channel to drain the workings. He purchased the mineral rights to lands at Cuttlehill, further north in 1798, and extended the waggonway to pits there. In 1798 the cost of construction was thought to be £450 per mile, and the maintenance cost £560 for the entire 4 1/4 miles (6.8 km) annually. The 48 long cwt (5,400 lb or 2,400 kg) waggons required two horses to draw them.

In December 1817 Henderson died and his daughter Anne Isabella inherited the estate, and in time she became the second wife of Sir Philip Calderwood Durham.

From 1823 coal was exploited from Prathouse by the Halbeath Company, which had its own railway network. However they were unable to connect their new pit to their own network, so they leased the pit to Sir Philip Durham and the Fordell system was extended to reach it, from West Moss pits. The line was opened in 1841 - 1842.

St David's Harbour was progressively improved in the nineteenth century as volumes of coal handled increased. It was deepened in 1826 and again in 1832 together with an extension to the pier. In 1844 an improved siding layout was installed, together with coal hoists.

In March 1832 the mine manager, William L Gofton, submitted a plan for upgrading the line, which was agreed upon. A new pit called Lady Anne was sunk south of Cuttlehill in 1833 and the upgrading of the line started at the same time. There was a short tunnel under the Crossgates – Donibristle road.

There were to be two inclined planes; one at Colton — 332 yards (304 m) with a gradient of 1 in 24 (41.7 ‰) — and one at Fordell House, known as the Vantage incline. Vantage was 1,148 yards (1,050 m) long with a gradient of 1 in 23+3/4 (44.2 ‰). At Hillend an extra horse was stationed to assist waggons up the incline.

The inclined planes used a large wheel round which the rope (later a wire rope) passed and there was a brake on the drum enabling a man to control the speed of the movement; it was worked on the balanced system: four loaded waggons descended and hauled four empties up. The upper part of the inclined plane had three rails and the lower half was single track, with a passing loop at the mid point.

Robert Hawthorn of Newcastle was asked to comment on the technical changes, and he proposed a further tunnel at Hillend bridge, under the Inverkeithing road, and a third inclined plane near St David's ending near the south pier. It was 480 yards (440 m) long on a gradient of1 in 28 (35.7 ‰).

The gauge of the new iron railway line was the same as the wooden railway and it was 4 1/2 miles (7.2 km) in length, falling continuously from Lady Anne pit 440 feet (134 m) above the track on the pier at St David's. The rails were 28 pounds per yard (14 kg/m) fish-bellied, procured from the Bedlington Iron Company. They were held in 9 pounds (4.1 kg) iron chairs secure to whinstone block sleepers by two iron pegs. The joint sleeper blocks were double width and there were no fishplates.

Between the inclines trains of four waggons were pulled by two horses. The cost of operation was thought to be about one-third of that with the wooden track system, and 50,000 long tons (56,000 short tons; 51,000 t) were carried annually, considered to be double the maximum possible on the old track.

The pit known as Wellington, renamed William in 1843, was also operating from 1843; coal was brought down from it to Lady Anne by a separate self-acting inclined plane. In 1847 no. 9 Pit was sunk, near to Lady Anne. Light parallel iron rails were used in the short branch connection. In 1850 the George Pit was sunk on the north of Cuttlehill; a standard gauge waggonway was built to connect to the nearby Edinburgh, Perth and Dundee Railway.

Up until this time all the output of the collieries (except a small amount of land sale) went for coastal and export shipping through St David's. However as the railway extended northwards, it now came close to the Edinburgh, Perth and Dundee Railway (EP&DR) Dunfermline branch line near Crossgates, and in 1853 a separate short waggonway was built connecting the George Pit with the EP&DR. This seems not to have diminished the volumes passing through St David's, due to the continuing expansion of the trade.

The extensive trackwork at the Alice exchange sidings (near Crossgates) were all of mixed gauge. Trouble was experienced with the mixed gauge points, and some were converted to a type where the approach rails were shifted to meet the lead rails, so that there were no switch rails at all.

From 1867 locomotive operation was planned on the line. The existing track was not strong enough to carry the loads of locomotives and relaying with steel rails was started from the St David's end, with some realignment to improve gradients. The Colton and Vantage inclines were reduced to single track, and the locomotive working started on 2 April 1868, a locomotive named St David's being the first to work. It was an 0-4-0 well tank built by Hawthorn & Co of Leith. It was brought in to St David's Harbour by boat. The relaying took place progressively, and the locomotive was restricted to the sections that had been dealt with. Some of the extremities were left with fish-bellied rails on stone sleepers and horse traction was used on them.

In 1871 a second locomotive, St George, was obtained, also arriving by boat. St George was an 0-4-0 saddle tank.

In 1880 Alice Pit was sunk near the main line of what was now the North British Railway (NBR, formerly the EP&DR). For some considerable time the pit was not used, but it was decided to extend the waggonway across Moss Morran from William Pit to Alice Pit and then round to George Pit. Moss Morran was a difficult bog, and large quantities of brushwood were dropped into it to stabilise it. The extension was complete by 1895: the Fordell Railway was now 5 3/4 miles (9.3 km) in extent.

The line between the George Pit and the NBR main line was laid in mixed gauge track, so that the output of George Pit and Alice Pit could be sent either to St David's or to the main line railway.

A third locomotive named Alice was obtained in 1880 from Grant, Ritchie & Co of Kilmarnock. It was an 0-4-0 saddle tank. This time the engine arrived by rail, at Crossgates, and was then drawn through the streets on temporary rails, drawn by horses.

About 1870 the waggons began to be fitted with brakes. This enabled greater loads to be taken by the locomotives, as controlling the waggons on the downward run was the limiting factor.

When the Forth Bridge was being completed, a new main line route from Inverkeithing to Burntisland was constructed, opened in 1890. At the point where its route intersected the Fordell Railway, the latter was lowered by 9 feet (2.7 m), and this resulted in a section of 814 yards (744 m) on which there was a gradient against the load, of 1 in 464 (2.2 ‰).

The first two locomotives (St David's and St George) were scrapped about the end of the nineteenth century, and two new engines were acquired from Andrew Barclay, Sons & Co of Kilmarnock: they were named Fordell, arrived in 1901, and Lord Hobart in 1912. They had steam brakes (unlike the previous engines which had hand brakes only), and spring buffers for the main line rolling stock.

Volumes of coal mined and carried on the line continued to increase, and a peak was reached in 1911 when 87,111 long tons (97,564 short tons; 88,509 t) tons were mined and all of that output was carried on the Fordell Railway. The First World War reduced the volume of trade enormously, and after the cessation of hostilities, the trade at St David's never recovered, as shippers preferred to use nearby harbours which were better suited to handling larger vessels. That process accelerated to 1945, when the now-obsolete coal handling equipment at St David's was an insuperable limitation. During World War II the Admiralty was the only customer, it was agreed that the coal output would all be taken north to the Alice Pit (a little to the east of the George Pit, and adjacent to the former EP&DR line) and taken away by main line railway.

The last load of coal went to St David's on 10 August 1946. The line between Fordell Village and Alice Pit (and the connection to the main line there) continued in use. At the time of closure there were 190 waggons of the original pattern, all of them without springs and opening at one end only.

== Elgin Railway ==
The Elgin Railway ran from several collieries and quarries north and north-west of Dunfermline to Charlestown harbour, west of Queensferry. (Note: Many contemporary accounts spell the place Charleston.)

Charles, the fifth Earl of Elgin owned collieries to the north and north-west of Dunfermline, and two harbours on the Forth: Charlestown and Limekilns. Both of these had limestone quarries nearby, and impressive arrays of lime kilns. Bruce extended limestone quarries near Broomhall, and built new kilns, before 1760. He constructed a harbour which he called Charlestown in 1761, and the works included a village with cottages for workers and ships' crews waiting for a tide.

Lime burning required large quantities of coal, but nothing suitable was available on the Broomhall estate, and Elgin was dependent on supplies from workings at Pitfirrane and Urquhart. The road transit was difficult, and he attempted to interest his neighbouring landowners, Sir John Wedderburn of Gosforth, now of Pitfirrane, and Robert Wellwood of Garvock and Pitliver, in improving transport facilities; in 1762 he was corresponding with them over a possible waggonway, but little was done. Lord Elgin gradually acquired land to the foot of the Pittencrieff Coal Road with a view to construction of a waggonway.

In 1765 George Chalmers of Edinburgh tried to persuade the Earl to grant a wayleave for a waggonway to replace the road transport. He had been to great trouble to discover the best Newcastle method, and wrote: "I suppose we can have people from Bo'ness or Carron who can make the waggons of a proper size and probably one which will hold 2 1/2 tons of coals may be sufficient for about 3 tons of limestone." He said he would consult William Brown of Throckley. In 1769 Chalmers wrote to Ralph Carr of Newcastle saying that a five-mile waggonway over rough terrain had been surveyed but that he wanted Mr Brown's advice. Chalmers' ambitions were partly realised when a short line was built at Limekilns to serve the kilns themselves, and a wooden waggonway was built from limestone quarries and coal pits at Berrylaw (west of Dunfermline) to the coast at Limekilns.

Some time between 1765 and 1780 a small network of lines to Charlestown was built, with an incline on a gradient of 1 in 6.7 on the final approach to Charlestown.

Thomas Pennant in 1772 called in during one of his tours, and noticed that the limestone is conveyed into the kilns by "a variety of railroads". The waggonway from Berrylaw coal pits to Limekilns, a distance of three miles (4.8 km), was laid between 1772 and 1775. (Note: Baxter (page 232) treats this as a separate network, the Limekilns Railway.) In 1777 the Pitfirrane pits and later those at Balmule and Urquhart to the north-east of Berrylaw were linked to Limekilns by a lengthy branch built by a Newcastle engineer, George Johnson. Perhaps by 1777 and certainly by 1792 (Note: Lewis, probably derivative; Thomas and Turnock say maybe not until 1812.) Charlestown kilns had waggonways too. Another branch was put in to Charlestown in 1801. Though the original Berrylaw - Limekilns waggonway survived for a time, most of it was finally removed, thus converting the two branches into the main line. This was probably done by 1812.

The gauge of Elgin's lines was 4 ft 3 in (1,295 mm) The waggon capacity increased from 50 long cwt (5,600 lb or 2,500 kg) to 60 long cwt (6,700 lb or 3,000 kg) between 1784 and 1796. The waggons had two iron wheels and two plain wooden wheels, and were drawn by two horses.

In 1794 Elgin's successor built a new line from Limekilns to recently acquired coal mines around Baldridge and Rosebank. The main flow on the second line was to Charlestown harbour. It is not certain when the line was relaid with edge rails, but it may have been completed in 1841. The system was expanding with branches to Netherton in 1812, Lady Elgin in 1823, to Francis and Bruce pits in 1826 and to Wellwood pit about 1840. Hunter and Tom pits were connected in 1850 and Balmudo pit about 1857.

The track gauge was 4 ft (1,219 mm) sleeper lengths of 5, 6, and 7 feet (1.5, 1.8, and 2.1 m) were used.

In 1796 the system 8,230 yards (7,526 m) of main line, 2,800 yards (2,560 m) of bye way (i.e. sidings and passing loops) and 1,370 yards (1,253 m) of check rails. About 1810 the track was converted to the use of iron edge rails.

The waggon capacity was 50 long cwt (5,600 lb or 2,500 kg) in 1784, increased to 60 long cwt (6,700 lb or 3,000 kg) by 1796. In the early 1820s Elgin waggonway had spring catch points with iron rails, worked by remote control.

In 1824 Alexander Scott described the line in a technical paper:

The railway on Lord Elgin's works, between Dunfermline and Limekilns in Fife, for design and execution, is inferior to none. On this line of railway there are two inclined planes, executed with all the requisite machinery, for the loaded waggons drawing up the empty ones; the longest of these is about 511 yards, with a declivity of about one in twenty. Between the two inclined planes, the ground had been originally nearly level to some extent: an ingenious advantage is taken of this level, by commencing, at a short distance from the foot of the upper inclined plane, and cutting out a track for a railway, with an easy slope in the line of the main descending railway for the loaded waggons, by banking up the earth, and facing it with a stone-wall; another railway is formed with a similar slope, but in a contrary direction, towards the foot of the upper inclined plane. In this manner the two railways are carried forward until they reach the top or bank-head of the under inclined plane, where the difference of perpendicular height between the two appears to be about 10 feet; the one-half of this height gives a declivity to the loaded waggons to proceed downwards; and the other half a declivity to the empty waggons, to proceed to the foot of the upper inclined plane: the brake or drag of the loaded waggons has only to be attended to, for regulating their motion to the place where they start on the inclined plane.

By forming the two railways upon the original level line, in the manner above described, the bank-head of the empty waggons is several yards from the bank-head where the loaded waggons start: this distance is got the better of, by means of an additional piece of rope or chain, that is hooked off and on, as occasion requires. The breadth of each set of tracks on this line is 4 feet 3 inches; (Note: The track gauge was 4ft 0in. Lewis points out that Scott is referring to a back-to-back dimension; original drawings of 1821 - 1823 show the gauge as 4ft.) the weight of each of the waggons, when loaded, is between 2 and 3 tons. From 100 to 200 tons of coal pass down this line daily.

The railway was later realigned; improvements may have been made by 1821 by the engineer Landale. Further improvements were made in the Coalbridge area in the 1830s to improve sharp curves, and there was a realignment at Merryhill in 1851 to meet the requirements of the turnpike trust.

There was also a branch to Nethertown in Dunfermline, opened in 1833, and it was used for general freight traffic and passengers. This changed its nature from a purely mineral line and it became known, informally at first, as the Dunfermline and Charlestown Railway. The passengers were conveyed from 31 October 1833 from a "depot" at the foot of the Nethertown incline to Charlestown. A surprising number of the passengers travelled to Charlestown for the purpose of sea-bathing, which had become a popular craze.

The extension to Nethertown itself was opened on 10 March 1834; this "Nethertown" was a little north of the 1812 branch terminus.

Quick explains the first passenger operations:

Dunfermline was provided with a link to the Forth steamers. Towards the end of 1833 a service was advertised from the junction of the coal road to Charlestown, just short of the harbour. From 1834 it ran from the Dunfermline station at Netherton (sic). Returns to the Board of Trade for the first half of 1842 say that the service ran twice daily in winter, four times in summer, with no intermediate stoppages. All services were horse-drawn until 1853, when steam was introduced for minerals. In June 1853 the line was inspected with a view to attaching passenger carriages to steam-drawn mineral trains, but the permission was refused. The service ceased at the end of September 1863. (North British Railway minutes of 21 August said that the Company would be discontinuing the arrangement on and after 1 October following.)

Quick states that the passenger service ended in September 1863.

Chalmers described the situation on Lord Elgin's railway:

His Lordship's coal is conveyed to his limeworks and shipping at Charleston [sic] by a railroad, the two inclined planes of which, near the town of Dunfermline, are much admired, and were executed, on a change of the line of the rail-road in 1821, at very great expense, under the direction of the late ingenious Mr Landale of Dundee. The Wellwood coal for exportation is now also conveyed along this railway, which is connected with that colliery by a branch line... The railway is about six miles in length, but longer when the branches to the different pits, &c, are taken into account. There are from 100 to 500 tons of coal generally carried along it in a day, according to the demand, or the number of vessels lying in the Charleston harbour waiting for them.

In October 1849 the main line of the Elgin Railway was converted to standard gauge. As the changeover took a few days during which the line was closed, and an early railway replacement bus service was operated in substitution for the passenger trains, operated by John Croall and Co of Edinburgh.

About 1850 a connection was made at Colton to the standard gauge line of the Stirling and Dunfermline Railway. Steam traction was adopted on the Elgin line. In 1852 Chalmers published a second volume, in which he described the adoption of steam engines:

Steam was for the first time introduced on the Railway to Charleston in February 1852, whereby that seaport is brought within 10 or 12 minutes of Dunfermline. There is one large railway carriage, able to accommodate about 50 passengers... There are two inclines on the railroad near to the town of Dunfermline and a third at the shore. The coals are conveyed by a locomotive engine from the pits to the top of the first incline at the Colton station, [near the] east end of Golf Drum Street, and from the bottom of it they are drawn a short distance by horses, to the top of the second incline, which commences a little south of Pittencrieff toll-bar, and are afterwards conveyed by another locomotive, which takes also goods and passengers from the Netherton (sic) station in the town of Dunfermline to the steamboats that ply between Stirling and Granton [near Edinburgh] pier.

By 1861 much of the network was purchased by the West of Fife Mineral Railway (below) and the remainder, the central section through Dunfermline, was abandoned in 1866.

== Halbeath Railway ==
The Halbeath Railway ran from Sampson Lloyd's collieries near Crossgates and Dunfermline to the Forth at Inverkeithing where coal was exported, and also used in salt pans. A line of five miles (8.0 km) in length was opened in 1783, using wooden track. In due course connections were made to other industries, including limestone quarries at Sunnybank, freestone quarries at Bonnyside and Rosebank and distilling at Borland. The construction costs had been estimated at £750 per mile including the waggons. There were passing places on the single track at intervals of 550 yards (503 m). Traffic developed sufficiently to justify improvement of track with iron capping of the wooden rails by 1798. Iron edge rails were installed in 1811. The track gauge was 4 ft 4 in (1,321 mm). In 1841 a branch opened from Guttergates to Townhill collieries. (below)

In the 1846 parliamentary session the bill for the Edinburgh and Perth Direct Railway (E&PDR) was rejected. The North British Railway (NBR) had hoped to expand northwards by an alliance with this company, and the NBR board had decided to commit up to £25,000 to the purchase of the Halbeath Railway, as it was anticipated that the route of the Halbeath would be used for a future main line north. £10,000 was put down as a deposit. This caused an uproar at a shareholders' meeting as the Board was already under fire for committing the company's money to speculative schemes, and the shares in the Halbeath line that had been purchased were subsequently sold.

When the Edinburgh and Northern Railway (E&NR) obtained authorisation for its line, the exact alignment of the Dunfermline branch left ambiguous the question of the intersection with the Halbeath Railway. When the time came to make the crossing, the E&NR understood that a flat crossing was to be made, but the rival Edinburgh and Perth Direct Railway provisional committee still owned the Halbeath line, although it was moribund by this time. The E&PDR committee still harboured thoughts of promoting their northward line, notwithstanding the earlier setback. Accordingly the Halbeath directors, prompted by the E&PDR, refused to agree to a flat crossing of their line, and the completion of the Dunfermline branch was frustrated: it terminated for the time being at Crossgates in 1848. Negotiations with the Halbeath people failed to reach any sensible compromise, whether underbridge, overbridge, or anything else. It was only when the E&PDR scheme was obviously doomed that the matter was resolved, and the Dunfermline branch was completed, making a flat crossing with the Halbeath line after all, and opening in 1849.

The Halbeath line was abandoned as an operational railway in 1867.

Nonetheless by now the NBR had acquired the entire company, and over several years when its utility as a springboard for a Perth line was gone, the NBR tried to sell it. In January 1869 the NBR noted that it was "a very bad investment, but we cannot get rid of it": no-one would buy it. In 1871 the entire Halbeath line was closed down and some of its track removed.

In 1877 part of the trackbed was used for the Inverkeithing Harbour branch, an offshoot of the Dunfermline and Queensferry Railway, which had been taken over by the NBR. In 1882, 43 long tons (48 short tons; 44 t) of scrap, probably rails, were sold from the line by the NBR, and by July 1896 all the rails had been lifted and sold except for 300 yards (274 m) to Inverkeithing brickworks, and 377 yards (345 m) at the northern end.

== Townhill waggonway ==
The town of Dunfermline owned the Townhill colliery, but found it difficult and expensive to transport its output to harbours on the Forth. After a long period during which road transport was used, a waggonway to join the Halbeath line at Guttergates was built; it opened in September 1841 from North Engine (Townhill No 1 Pit) with a short branch to Humbug. There was a fall of 100 feet (30.5 m) to the junction with the Halbeath line, but an initial section of the route rose (against the load) to Bellyeoman before falling at 1 in 32 (31.3 ‰).

== Venturefair waggonway ==
There was a pit called Venturefair near the Town Loch: writing in 1879 Ebenezer Henderson said:

Early in the year 1812, Mr Syme completed a railway between his colliery at Venture-Fair ... and Knabbie Street, where his town coal depot was situated. This coal depot which was situated about the middle of Knabbie Street, north side, at the back of the houses, has been disused for about fifty years.

The line was a little over 1 mile (1.6 km) long, and included a viaduct of four arches 30 feet (9.1 m) high. The track was probably cast iron rails on stone sleepers.

== Townhill branch extension ==
The Townhill branch was extended to connect with the Elgin system about the year 1856, and also to reach Wellwood colliery, which had lost its link with Charlestown by this time. Traffic on the Townhill line and its various connections then became dominant and the line to Halbeath had closed by 1850. In the end all the traffic from the Townhill area was routed to the NBR at Charlestown by the Elgin Railway and the link with Inverkeithing closed by 1867.

== Main line railways ==
In 1830 the Liverpool and Manchester Railway opened for traffic, and with its predecessor lines showed what a modern railway would be like: steam locomotives replaced horse traction, and waggons ran coupled together in trains. Speeds faster than a trotting horse were now taken for granted; and passengers were conveyed.

The transition did not take place overnight, and for a long time purely mineral concerns did not associate themselves with the concept of a modern, relatively high speed railway. Moreover for several critical years, money was very tight. However the Edinburgh and Glasgow Railway was authorised in 1838 and opened its main line in 1842, and the race was on to construct lines to connect with the emerging English railway network, and to form a Scottish system too. In 1845 a prodigious number of railway schemes were authorised, and not all of them were to be successful. However the Edinburgh and Northern Railway (E&NR) was constructed, and by an accident of railway politics the authorisation included a branch line from Thornton to Dunfermline, opened to Crossgates in 1848. The E&NR reached Dunfermline in 1849. (It changed its name to the Edinburgh, Perth and Dundee Railway in 1849 also.)

The other main line railway to enter Dunfermline at this time did so from the west: it was the Stirling and Dunfermline Railway, sponsored by the Edinburgh and Glasgow Railway. It opened in 1849 and made an end-on connection with the E&NR branch line. Together the two lines formed a continuous west to east line through the area.

In fact after the battle in which the Halbeath Railway was used to obstruct the E&NR line's construction, the E&NR was allowed to make a connection with the Townhill tramway and open up a standard gauge connection with the Townhill colliery by addition of a third rail. The same method was used to reach the Halbeath colliery.

== The Dunfermline and Charlestown Railway ==
The Dunfermline branch was added to the Elgin system in 1834, before the arrival of the two main line railways. Passengers and general goods were conveyed from Dunfermline to Charlestown Harbour, which became an important ferry port for transport to Edinburgh. This changed the character of the Elgin Railway network from a simple mineral line to a general railway, and the route soon became known informally as the Dunfermline and Charlestown Railway. The entire network was 6 miles (9.7 km) long between Wellwood, Baldridge and Charlestown Harbour. In the 1850s a line was added running eastwards across the north side of Dunfermline to join up with the Halbeath Railway system, giving access to the Halbeath collieries.

== Charleston Railway and Harbour Company ==
Charleston Railway and Harbour Act 1859
- Act of Parliament
- Parliament of the United Kingdom
- Long title: An Act to authorize the Charleston Railway and Harbour Company to purchase and acquire the Charleston Railway and Harbour, and to extend and improve the said Railway and Harbour.
- Citation: 22 & 23 Vict. c. xcvi

Dates
- Royal assent: 8 August 1859

The Charleston Railway and Harbour Company was incorporated by the Charleston Railway and Harbour Act 1859 (22 & 23 Vict. c. xcvi) on 8 August 1859, with capital of £72,000. The act empowered the new company to take over some of the network of the Elgin Railway, between Charlestown and a junction with the West of Fife Mineral Railway at Dunfermline (Townhill Junction), and to improve the harbour at Charlestown. Authorised capital was £72,000.

The Elgin lines that became part of the Charleston Railway were already working co-operatively with the new West of Fife Mineral Railway (below), and the co-operation continued.

== West of Fife Mineral Railway ==
West of Fife Mineral Railway Act 1856
- Act of Parliament
- Parliament of the United Kingdom
- Long title: An Act for making a Railway from Dunfermline to Killairnie with a Branch to Kingseat in the County of Fife, to be called "The West of Fife Mineral Railway."
- Citation: 19 & 20 Vict. c. xcviii

Dates
- Royal assent: 14 July 1856

Text of statute as originally enacted

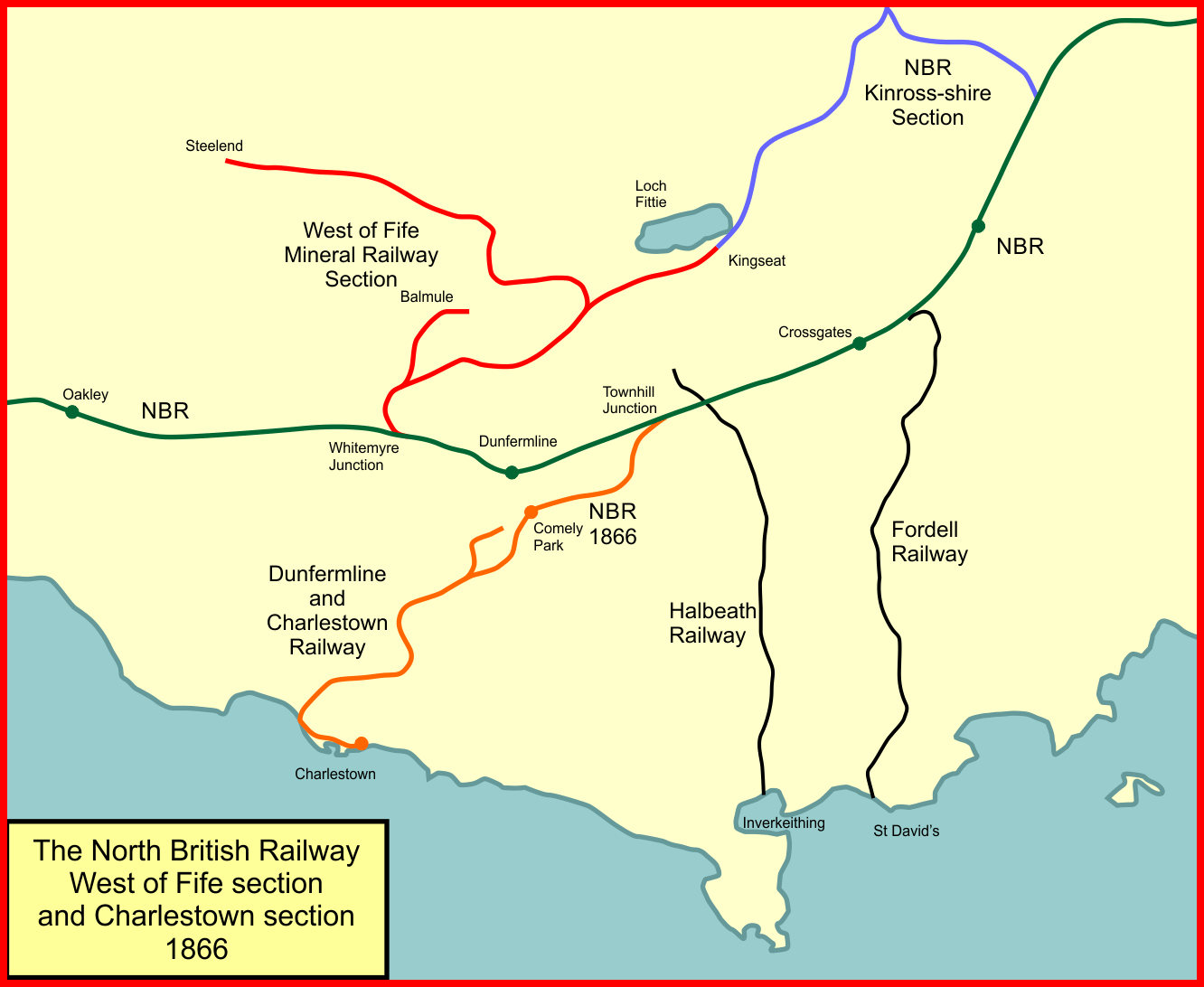
The West of Fife Mineral Railway system

As the extractive industries of West Fife developed, increasing numbers of pits needed a railway connection, and on 14 July 1856 the West of Fife Mineral Railway was authorised by the West of Fife Mineral Railway Act 1856 (19 & 20 Vict. c. xcviii), to build a line between Dunfermline and Killairnie, on the way to Saline. Good quality blackband ironstone and limestone were known to be available as well as coal. The Dunfermline starting point was to be at or near the Elgin Railway Junction (which became Whitemyre Junction), and the termination was to be "at a Point in a Field or Enclosure on the Estate of Killairnie, adjoining the Junction of the Turnpike Road from Redcraigs to Saline, with the New Road leading there from to North Steelend". There was to be a branch to Kingseat. Authorised capital was £45,000, and passenger operation had been mentioned in the prospectus and was authorised in the act, although passengers were never actually carried. It opened as far as Steelend on 25 June 1858. The opening of the West of Fife, which was a railway of standard gauge using modern wagons, offering direct transit onward to the main line network, changed the nature of the mineral lines in the area, and the old waggonway lines suffered.

West of Fife Mineral Railway (Roscobie Branch) Act 1857
- Act of Parliament
- Parliament of the United Kingdom
- Long title: An Act to enable the West of Fife Mineral Railway Company to construct a Branch Railway to Roscobie; and for certain other Purposes.
- Citation: 20 & 21 Vict. c. xci

Dates
- Royal assent: 27 July 1857

Text of statute as originally enacted

By the West of Fife Mineral Railway (Roscobie Branch) Act 1857 (20 & 21 Vict. c. xci) of 27 July 1859 the West of Fife was authorised to extend to Roscobie, and finally the West of Fife Mineral Railway (Kingseat Extension) Act 1860 (23 & 24 Vict. c. cxlv) of 23 July 1860 to extend the Kingseat branch to Beath.

West of Fife Mineral Railway (Kingseat Extension) Act 1860
- Act of Parliament
- Parliament of the United Kingdom
- Long title: An Act to enable the West of Fife Mineral Railway Company to extend the Kingseat Branch of their Railway; and for certain other Purposes.
- Citation: 23 & 24 Vict. c. cxlv

Dates
- Royal assent: 23 July 1860

Construction of the line to Loch Fittie (the Kingseat branch) was delayed owing to a dispute over mineral rights. Additional powers, the West of Fife Mineral Railway (Kingseat Extension) Act 1860 (23 & 24 Vict. c. cxlv) of 23 July 1860, were needed for the line when it was finally built; it was completed after the end of the independent existence of the company. It served new workings south of Loch Fitty; development of these deep pits allowed the life expired Halbeath pits to be abandoned. The terminal point of the Kingseat branch was close to the end of the Kinross-shire Railway, and the lines were connected by the Kinross-shire Railway when the West of Fife line was built. The Kingseat branch became the West of Fife main line with a greater volume of traffic than the Steelend line, where collieries were much slower to develop.

The West of Fife wanted to get access to the harbour at Charlestown:

The West of Fife Railway Company have just completed an arrangement, about which there has been of late considerable negotiation, whereby they acquire, at a cost we believe of £62,000, the Charlestown Railway from the Right Hon. the Earl of Elgin. The Charlestown Railway embraces the line from Dunfermline to Charlestown Harbour... There will, we understand, be considerable alterations effected by the new proprietors on the gradients of the Charlestown line, so as to make the railway more available than hitherto for passengers as well as for mineral traffic.

West of Fife Railway and Harbour Act 1861
- Act of Parliament
- Parliament of the United Kingdom
- Long title: An Act to amalgamate the West of Fife Mineral Railway Company and the Charleston Railway and Harbour Company.
- Citation: 24 & 25 Vict. c. ccxxvi

Dates
- Royal assent: 1 August 1861

On 1 August 1861 the West of Fife Railway and Harbour Act 1861 (24 & 25 Vict. c. ccxxvi) merged the West of Fife Railway Company with the Charlestown Railway and Harbour Company, and also the Elgin Railways, to form the West of Fife Railway and Harbour Company. Formal absorption was discussed in October 1858 and was formalised from 1 October 1861.

== West of Fife Railway and Harbour Company ==
The West of Fife Railway and Harbour Company started its existence in a satisfactory financial position; at a shareholders' meeting on 13 September 1861 a 5% dividend was announced for Charlestown shareholders and 4% to West of Fife shareholders. However since 1858 the West of Fife company had feared an incursion by the Edinburgh and Glasgow Railway, which had proposed a line from North Queensferry; if successful, such a line would seriously reduce the profitability of the West of Fife company, and consideration was given to a merger with the North British Railway.

== In North British Railway hands ==
Accordingly, the independent existence of the new company did not endure long: by the North British, Edinburgh, Perth and Dundee and West of Fife Railways Amalgamation Act 1862 (25 & 26 Vict. c. clxxxix) of 29 July 1862 the West of Fife Railway and Harbour Company was vested in the North British Railway. The former Elgin railway system declined rapidly in importance after the NBR takeover, when the company wished to make direct connection with its own standard gauge wagons, and parts of the network soon closed.

On 27 October 1862 a new locomotive-worked incline down to the harbour at Charlestown was opened, replacing the rope worked incline. Improvement works were also carried out at the harbour itself. The new line was a single-track deviation at a gradient of 1 in 50, leaving the old line at Broadhills. The old line closed on 25 October 1862: at this time the passenger service was in operation and the new deviation had not been inspected by the Board of Trade inspector for approval for passenger operation, so a temporary station was built at Merryhill, the lowest point on the original line. Passengers had to walk the last one-half mile (0.8 km) to Charlestown, and passenger usage immediately declined substantially. The passenger service ceased from 30 September 1863.

Getting access to Charlestown from the main line railway network involved the use of the exchange sidings at Colton, west of Dunfermline. However the former Elgin line running south from there to Charlestown used the Pittencrieff incline, which was still rope-worked. The North British (Edinburgh, Dunfermline and Perth) Railway Act 1863 (26 & 27 Vict. c. ccxiii) authorised a new line by-passing it. The new line left the Nethertown line at Liggar's Bridge (at a junction called Elbowend Junction) and continued eastwards, passing round the south and then northwards past the east side of Dunfermline, turning east again to join the Dunfermline to Cowdenbeath line at Townhill Junction. This new line opened during the first half of 1865. The Pittencrieff incline continued in use nonetheless, serving Baldridge Pit, until 1875. The new line was the basis of the later Dunfermline and Queensferry Railway approach to Dunfermline, but at this stage it was a mineral railway only.

The West of Fife line had been engineered by Thomas Bouch, who had made a name for himself building low-cost railways, avoiding expensive and—he argued—unnecessary engineering features. From 1875 the North British Railway found it necessary to regrade and reconstruct much of the original sections of the West of Fife line.

On 1 June 1880 the NBR opened a connection from Lilliehill Junction to Townhill Junction, providing a more convenient connection to the West of Fife mineral lines.

The Dunfermline and Queensferry Railway had long been proposed, and it was finally opened on 2 November 1877, leaving the Charlestown line at Charlestown Junction. It had been conceived as an alternative route for ferry passengers crossing the Forth at Queensferry. It was promoted independently, and the North British Railway had promised financial support, but as it became increasingly likely that a Forth Bridge would soon be built, the NBR lost interest, and the little company had to fall back on its own resources. It used a Comely Park passenger station in Dunfermline (later renamed Dunfermline Lower in 1890) and Townhill Junction at Dunfermline faced eastwards.

Until 1890 there was no Forth Bridge: the east and north of Fife were reached from Edinburgh by crossing the Firth of Forth by ferry to Burntisland. Alternatively, Perth could be reached by way of Falkirk, crossing the Forth at Stirling. During the planning and construction of the Forth Bridge, the North British Railway set about designing the network of lines needed to reach it directly. On the south side a new line was built from Saughton Junction to South Queensferry. On the north side the 1877 Dunfermline and Queensferry line led to the approaches to the bridge.

In the Dunfermline area, a new south-to-west curve was built at Touch Junctions, enabling trains from the Forth Bridge to turn west to the original Dunfermline (Upper) station. Comely Park station in Dunfermline was renamed Dunfermline Lower. Burntisland had become a major port for the export of coal from the Fife coalfields. A direct line from Inverkeithing to Burntisland was needed, enabling trains crossing the Bridge to turn east and reach Burntisland, Kirkcaldy and the coastal towns. The junction at Inverkeithing was made a triangle so that coal trains from west and north of Dunfermline could run direct to Burntisland. These lines all opened in 1890.

On 1 September 1894 a new passenger service was instigated on the Charlestown line; it continued until 1 November 1926. Four southbound and three northbound services are shown in the 1895 Bradshaw, supplemented by one Mondays only return working and four Saturdays-only trips. Journey time from Dunfermline Lower was 10 to 15 minutes. An intermediate passenger station on the Charlestown line was opened early in March 1916; it was named Crombie Halt, and was provided for munitions workers at the Royal Ordnance Depot. It was later opened to public use on 1 March 1921, renamed Braeside. It closed with the line in 1926. Bruce comments on the sharp curves and steep gradients of the branch, which had four intermediate siding connections. Freight traffic continued to use the Charlestown line until 1964 serving a Royal Navy Armaments Depot.

In 1906 the North British Railway opened a connecting line towards its Kincardine branch, joining the former Charlestown route at Elbowend Junction.

A lengthy three-mile (4.8 km) extension beyond Steelend on the West of Fife line was built by the North British Railway in 1909 for, and at the expense of, John Wilson MP, who had plans for mining on the western side of Saline hills. The line was called the Sheardrum branch; Wilson's expectations were not well fulfilled, and the branch and the mines were not successful, and the extension closed in 1935.

St David's harbour was placed under naval control during World War I, as the important Royal Navy Dockyard of Rosyth was close by. The closure to commercial business meant that after the war, most customers had taken their business elsewhere.

A platform was constructed on the Charlestown branch for the use of workers at Crombie Depot. Work started in December 1915 and it opened on 25 May 1916. It was for the use of workmen employed at the depot only. However the station was opened to the general public as Braeside on 1 March 1921; this was the last station to be opened by the North British Railway.

== Closure ==
The passenger service to Charlestown was withdrawn at the beginning of November 1926, possibly 1 November 1926, although Crombie depot continued to receive a considerable goods traffic, up to twenty wagons daily. The Kincardine line passenger service was withdrawn from 7 July 1930. Braeside Halt had closed on 1 August 1926.

By the end of World War II the geological reserves of the Dunfermline coalfield were nearing exhaustion, and the mineral railways were dependent on the coal mining for their own survival. The decline continued and by 1963 nearly all of the West of Fife mineral lines had closed. The West of Fife Railway section from Gask Junction to Steelend closed on 7 June 1951, and the West of Fife line to Gask Junction and Lathalmond depot closed on 5 July 1951.

The Nethertown goods branch from Elbowend Junction closed on 3 August 1959, and the Whitemyre Junction to Lilliehill Junction main line closed on 2 September 1963. Lilliehill was still reached directly from Townhill Junction until that route too closed on 31 December 1976. Meanwhile Charlestown goods closed on 24 February 1964.

From February 1964 the Charlestown line to Crombie Depot was leased to the Admiralty, but that closed in December 1990.

In fact all that remained were two lines. The route from the Forth Bridge to Dunfermline Lower and Townhill Junction continued as an important passenger and goods route, and this remains in use at the present time.

The second was the Kincardine Line, which connected with the Charlestown branch at Elbowend Junction. This had lost its passenger service in 1930, and was sustained by two coal fired power stations. One has since closed and the other will have closed by March 2016. Re-opening of the line to passenger traffic has been proposed; it is not clear at present (2015) whether this is viable.
