= Steelend =

Coordinates: 56.112°N 3.549°W

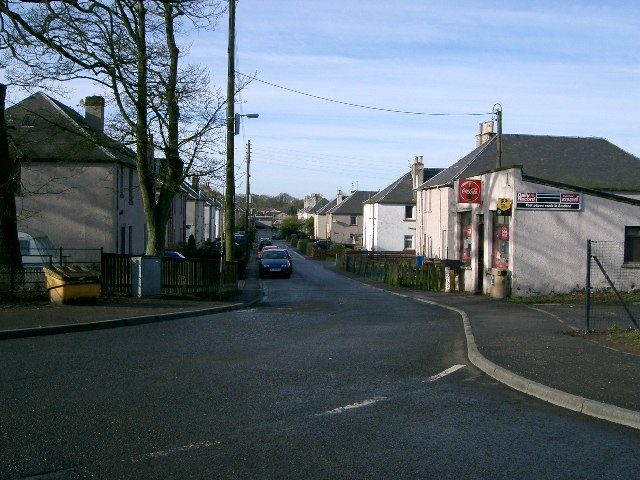
- Steelend in 2006

- Location within Fife
- Population: 320 (1991)
- OS grid reference: NT036924
- Council area: Fife
- Country: Scotland
- Sovereign state: United Kingdom
- Post town: Dunfermline
- Police: Scotland
- Fire: Scottish
- Ambulance: Scottish
- UK Parliament: Dunfermline and West Fife
- Scottish Parliament: Dunfermline

Steelend is a former mining village in West Fife, Scotland, located on the B914 road approximately three-quarters of a mile east of the village of Saline and four miles north-west of Dunfermline. The village is home to a community centre and the Steelend Miners Welfare Club. A church was once located in the village but was demolished in the 1980s. In 1991 it had a population of 320.

The now-defunct Steelend Victoria F.C. were based at Woodside Park on the east side of the village until 2013 when the club folded due to financial issues. The name comes from a farm on Saline Hill north of Steelend.

A goods railway station once existed to the east of the village on the West of Fife Mineral Railway. The station served the several collieries that once operated nearby to Steelend, which included Sunnybraes Colliery, Saline Valley Colliery, Killernie Colliery and North Steelend Colliery.

The public transport serves the village in the form of buses which run to Dunfermline, Falkirk or Rosyth.

To the south of the village is Bandrum Hill, on top of which is a large standing stone, which are accessible from Steelend by a path. To the north of the village is the eastern end of Saline Glen, which carries the Saline Burn and a footpath which leads west into the centre of Saline.
