= Cowdenbeath Old railway station =

Disused railway station in Cowdenbeath, Fife

Cowdenbeath Old
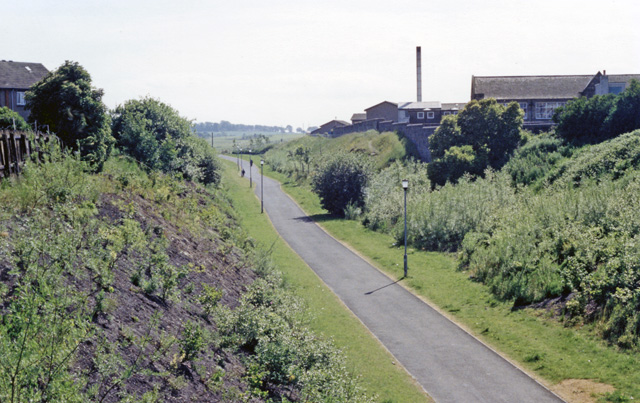
- The site of the station, looking northeast towards Lochgelly, in 1988

General information
- Location: Cowdenbeath, Fife; Scotland
- Coordinates: 56.1076°N 3.3416°W
- Grid reference: NT166913
- Platforms: 2

Other information
- Status: Disused

History
- Original company: Edinburgh and Northern Railway
- Pre-grouping: Edinburgh, Perth and Dundee Railway; North British Railway

Key dates
- 4 September 1848: Opened as Cowdenbeath
- 1 June 1890: Name changed to Cowdenbeath Old
- 31 March 1919: Closed
Location

Cowdenbeath railway station served the town of Cowdenbeath, Fife, Scotland, from 1848 to 1919 on the Edinburgh and Northern Railway.

== History ==
The station was opened on 4 September 1848 by the Edinburgh and Northern Railway. On the east side was the goods yard. The day before the newer Cowdenbeath station opened, the station's name was changed to Cowdenbeath Old on 1 June 1890. A deviation line opened to serve the new station in 1900, rendering this station useless, thus it closed on 31 March 1919, although it still remained open to miners.

Preceding station	Historical railways	Following station
Crossgates (Fife); Line and station closed	Edinburgh and Northern Railway	Lochgelly; Line closed, station open
