= Crossgates, Fife =

Coordinates: 56.084°N 3.3754°W

Crossgates
- Location within Fife
- Population: 2,830 (2020)
- OS grid reference: NT1441688756
- Council area: Fife
- Lieutenancy area: Fife
- Country: Scotland
- Sovereign state: United Kingdom
- Post town: COWDENBEATH
- Postcode district: KY4
- Police: Scotland
- Fire: Scottish
- Ambulance: Scottish
- UK Parliament: Kirkcaldy and Cowdenbeath
- Scottish Parliament: Cowdenbeath

Crossgates is a village in Fife, Scotland. It is located close to the junction of the M90 and A92, about two miles east of Dunfermline and a similar distance south west of Cowdenbeath. The village name means 'crossroads': it is situated at the point where the main Dunfermline-Kirkcaldy road crosses the old Great North Road from Inverkeithing to Perth.

According to the 2011 census, the village has a population of 2,458.

Crossgates has a long history of mining, both deep and opencast. In 2008 ATH Resources opened an opencast mine at Muir Dean to the south of the village, with the intention of removing 2,000,000 tons of coal. Planning permission for the mine was initially refused by Fife Council but the decision was later overturned by the Scottish Government. In April 2011, an application for an extension to the Muir Dean mine was lodged by ATH Resources to extend the surface mine to the south, which was granted. ATH Resources went into administration, leaving an ecological disaster with an uncertain future at the time. The majority of reparation works have now been completed, with the former mine infilled, and the landscape returned to farmland.

Crossgates is designated, via a signpost, as "Fife's first energy efficient village", though there is no evidence for this.

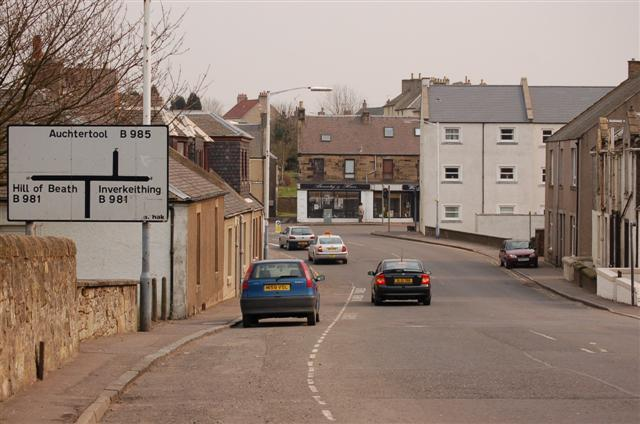
Crossgates, approaching from the M90 motorway

For a century, until 1949, it was served by a railway station on the Edinburgh and Northern Railway.

== Education ==
The village has one school, Crossgates Primary School, which also contains a nursery and under 3 provision. The school is split into 8 classes with around 210 students in the school. The school originally dates from 1920. Students from Crossgates Primary typically attend, Beath High School in Cowdenbeath which is the nearest high school to Crossgates.

== Sport ==
=== Football ===
Crossgates is home to the football club Crossgates Primrose, who compete in the East of Scotland League. The club play at Humbug Park in the village. Former Scottish International and Rangers player Jim Baxter started his career with the club before signing for Raith Rovers.

=== Lawn Bowls ===
Crossgates has its own Bowling Club which is located to the rear of the Community Centre (Miners' Institute) and has been there since 1940.

== Notable residents ==
- Stuart Adamson, guitarist of The Skids, Big Country and The Raphaels.
