= Charlestown railway station (ER) =

Disused railway station in Charlestown, Fife

Coordinates: 56.0367°N 3.5054°W

Charlestown

General information
- Location: Charlestown, Fife; Scotland
- Platforms: 1

Other information
- Status: Disused

History
- Original company: Elgin Railway
- Pre-grouping: North British Railway

Key dates
- 31 October 1833: Opened
- 30 September 1863: Closed
Location

Charlestown (ER) railway station served the town of Charlestown, Fife, Scotland from 1833 to 1863 on the Elgin Railway.

== History ==
The station opened on 31 October 1833 by the Elgin Railway. It closed on 30 September 1863, although a newer station opened on the Kincardine Line in 1894.
