= Kirkcaldy Greyhound Stadium =

Former Scottish greyhound racing venue

Kirkcaldy Greyhound Track
- Location: Kirkcaldy, Fife, Scotland
- Coordinates: 56°06′45″N 3°10′24″W
- Opened: 1934
- Closed: 1973

Kirkcaldy Greyhound Track was a former greyhound racing track in Kirkcaldy, Fife, Scotland.

== History ==
Greyhound Racing took place on the 2,300 capacity Kirkcaldy and District Track and Sports Ground, off Oriel Road, south of Masserene Road. Adjacent to the west side of the stadium was the Sunnybrae Plantation.

The first race meeting was on 15 December 1934. The racing was independent (not affiliated to the National Greyhound Racing Club) and continued for over 35 years. The race nights consisted of Thursday and Saturday evenings. The circumference of the track was 365 yards and the race distances were 235 and 410 yards.

In 1938, a greyhound promoter called Thomas Scott took a 15 year lease at Humbug Park. Scott was associated with Kirkcaldy Greyhound Stadium at the time.

The stadium was put up for sale in June 1966, following the retirement of the proprietor. The stadium continued to operate under the management of Jimmy Easton, until 1973, when it was marked for housing.
