= Crossgates Primrose F.C. =

Association football club in Scotland

Crossgates Primrose
- Full name: Crossgates Primrose Football Club
- Nickname: The Rose
- Founded: 1926 (folded 1960, re-formed 1983)
- Ground: Humbug Park; Inverkeithing Road; Crossgates
- Capacity: 2,000
- Coordinates: 56°4′55″N 3°22′39″W
- Chairman: Norrie Philp
- Manager: Alan Campbell
- League: East of Scotland League First Division
- 2025–26: East of Scotland League First Division, 10th of 16
- Website: https://www.crossgatesprimrosefc.com/
Home colours	Away colours

Crossgates Primrose Football Club are a Scottish football club based in Crossgates, near Dunfermline, Fife. The team plays in the East of Scotland League First Division, having moved from the junior leagues in 2018.

They were originally formed in 1926 but folded in 1960 with the club re-forming in 1983. Due to a lack of committee members, the club withdrew from the league in November 2015 and spent the rest of the season in abeyance. Following the establishment of a new committee in April 2016, Primrose returned to playing competitively for the 2016–17 season. The team have been managed since August 2017 by Alan Campbell.

Their home ground is Humbug Park, its unusual name deriving from a disused pit of the former Cuttlehill Colliery on which site the ground is located. The park was also home to greyhound racing between 1937 and 1953.

Crossgates' record attendance was 7,600 for a Scottish Junior Cup sixth round tie in 1952–53 against Auchinleck Talbot.

The club's best-known former players are Scotland legend Jim Baxter, who Crossgates sold to Raith Rovers for £200, and his second cousin George Kinnell.

== Current squad ==
As of 13 July 2026

Note: Flags indicate national team as defined under FIFA eligibility rules; some limited exceptions apply. Players may hold more than one non-FIFA nationality.

No.	Pos.	Nation	Player
1	GK	SCO	Logan Halliday
2	DF	SCO	Harrison Reid
3	DF	SCO	Charlie Murray
4	DF	SCO	Lyle Kellichan (Captain)
5	DF	SCO	Callum Deas
6	MF	SCO	Lachlan Murphy
7	MF	SCO	Reece Bernard
8	FW	SCO	Scott Hynd
9	FW	SCO	Mark McKenzie
10	MF	SCO	Craig Henderson
11	MF	SCO	Rab Kinnaird

No.	Pos.	Nation	Player
12	MF	SCO	Jaiden Fairley (on-loan from East Fife)
14	MF	SCO	Dylan Geddes
15	DF	SCO	Ben Finnan
16	DF	SCO	Max Donaldson
17	DF	SCO	Andy McDonald
18	FW	SCO	Aaron Wood
19	FW	SCO	Luke Mahady
21	GK	ENG	Johnathan Dunford (on-loan from East Fife)
23	MF	SCO	James McAteer
25	MF	SCO	Jake Rennie
—	MF	SCO	Layton Martin

Note: Flags indicate national team as defined under FIFA eligibility rules; some limited exceptions apply. Players may hold more than one non-FIFA nationality.

No.	Pos.	Nation	Player

--->

== Honours ==
- Alex Jack Cup: 2021–22
- Fife Junior Cup: 1947–48, 1955–56
