= Charleston station =

Charleston station may refer to:

== Transportation ==
- Charleston station (West Virginia), an Amtrak train station in Charleston, West Virginia, United States
- North Charleston station, an intermodal transportation center in North Charleston, South Carolina, United States
- Charleston Union Station Company, a former railroad company based in Charleston, South Carolina, United States
- Charleston station (Missouri), a former Missouri Pacific Railroad station in Charleston, Missouri
- Charleston railway station, a closed railway station in South Australia

== Military ==
- Charleston Air Force Station, a former United States Air Force Station in Charleston, Maine, United States
- Naval Weapons Station Charleston, a United States Navy base located on the west bank of the Cooper River, in South Carolina, United States, now named Naval Support Activity Charleston
- North Charleston Air Force Station, a closed United States Air Force General Surveillance Radar station in North Charleston, South Carolina, United States

== See also ==
- Charleston (disambiguation)
- Charlestown station (disambiguation)
