= Charlestown (KL) railway station =

One of two disused railway stations in Charlestown, Fife

Charlestown
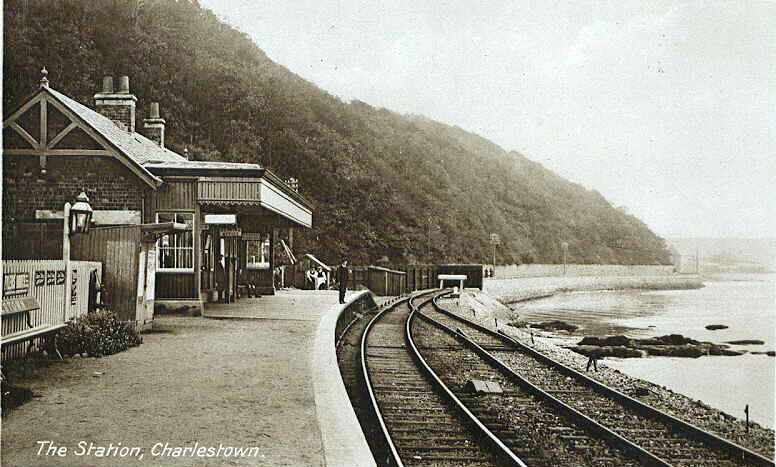

General information
- Location: Charlestown, Fife; Scotland
- Coordinates: 56.0353°N 3.4945°W
- Grid reference: NT069834
- Platforms: 1

Other information
- Status: Disused

History
- Original company: North British Railway
- Post-grouping: LNER

Key dates
- 1 September 1894: Opened
- 1 November 1926: Closed
Location

Charlestown railway station served the town of Charlestown, Fife, Scotland from 1894 to 1926 on the Kincardine Line.

== History ==
The station opened for passengers on 1 September 1894. It was on the shoreline and west of Limekilns. It closed to passengers on 1 November 1926.

Preceding station	Historical railways	Following station
Terminus	Kincardine Line	Dunfermline Town; Line partly open, station closed
