= Dunfermline City railway station =

Railway station in Fife, Scotland

Dunfermline City Scottish Gaelic: Baile Dhùn Phàrlain
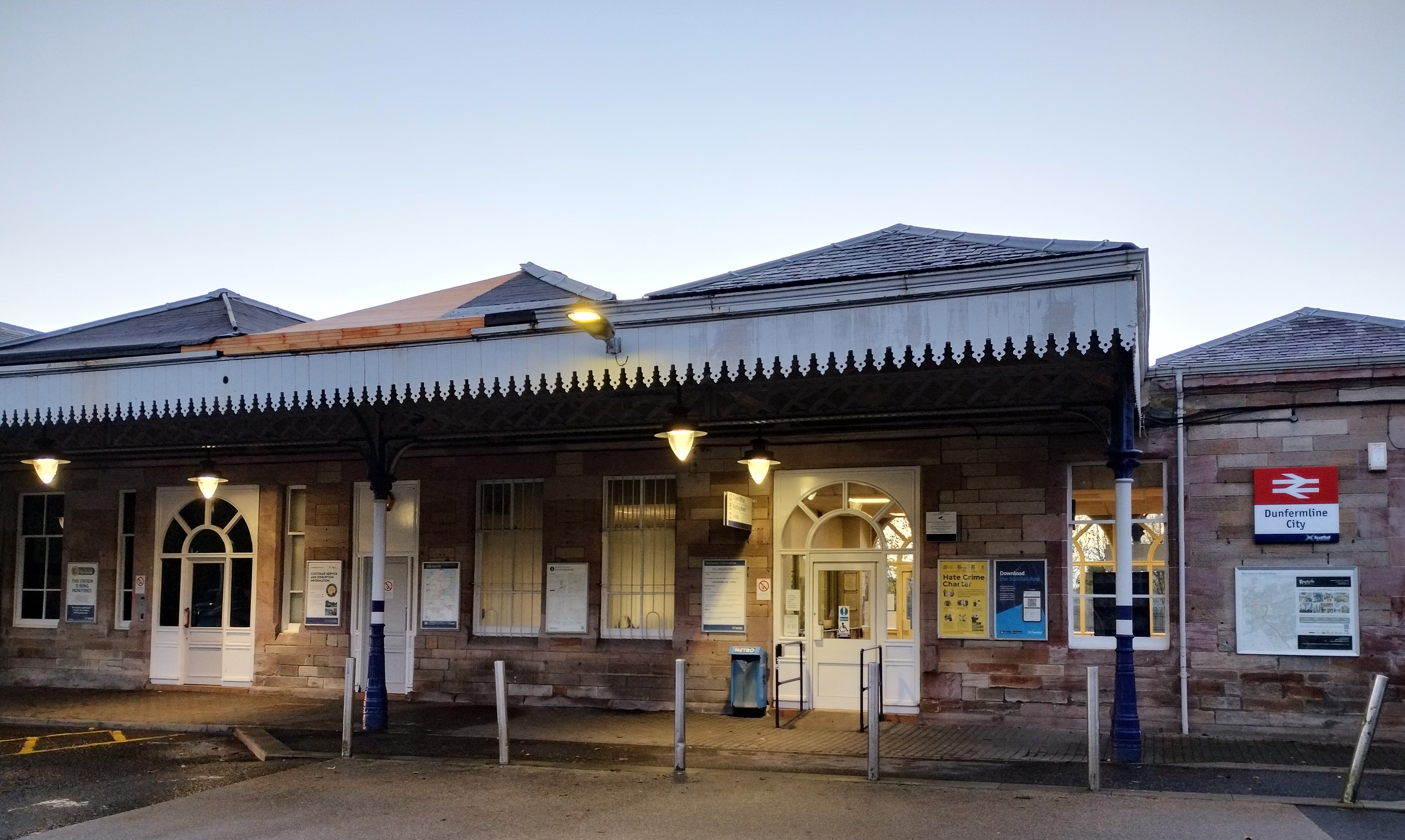
- St Margaret's Drive entrance

General information
- Location: Dunfermline, Fife; Scotland
- Coordinates: 56.0682°N 3.4521°W
- Grid reference: NT096870
- Manager: ScotRail
- Platforms: 2

Other information
- Station code: DFE

History
- Original company: Dunfermline and Queensferry Railway
- Pre-grouping: North British Railway
- Post-grouping: LNER

Key dates
- 5 March 1890: Opened as Dunfermline Lower
- 1968: Renamed as Dunfermline
- January 2000: Renamed as Dunfermline Town
- 3 October 2022: Renamed as Dunfermline City

Passengers
- 2020/21: ▼72,732
- 2021/22: ▲0.275 million
- 2022/23: ▲0.353 million
- 2023/24: ▲0.475 million
- 2024/25: ▲0.570 million
Location
Notes
- Passenger statistics from the Office of Rail and Road

Dunfermline City railway station (formerly Dunfermline Town) is a station in the city of Dunfermline, Fife, Scotland. The station is managed by ScotRail and is on the Fife Circle Line, 17 miles (27 km) north of Edinburgh Waverley.

== History ==
The station was opened by the Dunfermline and Queensferry Railway on 1 November 1877, named Dunfermline, Comely Park. It was rebuilt in 1889, the Down (northbound) platform being extended eastwards with a new booking office building and a new Up (southbound platform) being provided; the extended facilities were brought into use on 5 March 1890, from which date the station was known as Dunfermline Lower in contradistinction to Dunfermline Upper on the line to Stirling. After the latter station was closed in 1968, the suffix was dropped and it became known as plain Dunfermline. During the 1970s and 1980s British Rail only ran a regular daytime service on the Dunfermline line between Edinburgh and as far as Cowdenbeath; Lochgelly & Cardenden were only served during the weekday business peaks, whilst the remainder of the route to Thornton Junction was freight-only (having been closed to passengers in 1969). In 1989 though, BR decided to restore the Fife circular.

In March 1998, Dalgety Bay opened, while two years later in 2000, a new station was opened in the expanding eastern suburbs of Dunfermline and given the name of Dunfermline Queen Margaret, after the nearby Queen Margaret Hospital. To prevent confusion following the opening of the nearby Dunfermline Queen Margaret in 2000, the station was again renamed to Dunfermline Town. Around the same time the frequency was improved to every 30 mins to Edinburgh.

Following Dunfermline being granted city status, Jenny Gilruth, the Transport Minister, announced on 3 October 2022 that the station would be renamed to Dunfermline City.

== Station facilities ==
The station can be accessed from St. Margaret's Drive. The station building is on the northbound platform. In the building is a ticket office, a toilet (accessed by key) and a kiosk. There is also a CCTV monitoring centre for stations in the east of Scotland and a taxi ordering office. There is a public phone at the entrance and there are waiting rooms on both platforms. The platforms are connected by a ramped subway, this providing an alternative access to the station from Woodmill Street on the south side. There is a taxi rank at the main entrance and station car parks on both sides of the railway. CCTV is in operation.

== Train services ==
On Mondays to Saturdays during the daytime, there is a half-hourly service southbound to Edinburgh Waverley, and a half-hourly service northbound round the Fife Circle as far as Cowdenbeath, with one service per hour continuing through Leven since the spring 2025 timetable change. There is also a daily service to and from Perth via Markinch.

In 2016, the Sunday frequency service was increased to hourly, from its previous 2-hourly service.

Preceding station	National Rail	Following station
Rosyth	ScotRail; Fife Circle Line	Dunfermline Queen Margaret
	Historical railways	
Rosyth; Line and station open	North British Railway; Dunfermline and Queensferry Railway and Dunfermline Branch of E&NR	Halbeath; Line open; station closed
Rosyth; Line and station open	North British Railway; Dunfermline and Queensferry Railway and Dunfermline Branch of E&NR	Dunfermline Upper; Line and station closed
Cairneyhill; Line open; station closed	North British Railway; Kincardine Line	Terminus
Charlestown (KL); Line and station closed	North British Railway; Charlestown Railway	Terminus
