= Dunfermline Queen Margaret railway station =

Railway station in Fife, Scotland

Dunfermline Queen Margaret Scottish Gaelic: Dùn Phàrlain Banrigh Mairead
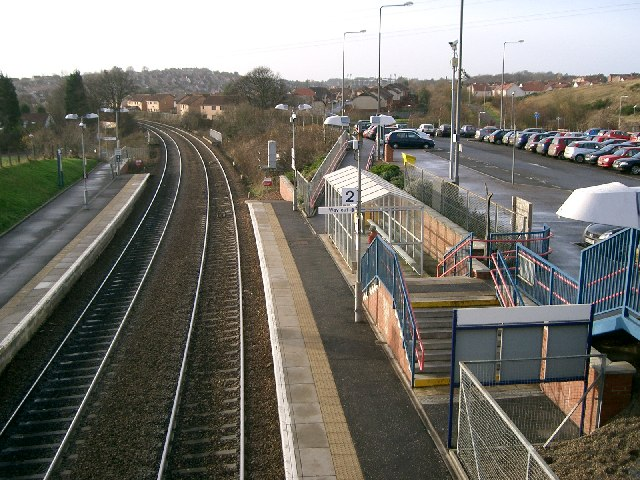
- A view looking west towards Dunfermline City station

General information
- Location: Dunfermline, Fife; Scotland
- Coordinates: 56.0803°N 3.4214°W
- Grid reference: NT116883
- Manager: ScotRail
- Platforms: 2

Other information
- Station code: DFL

History
- Original company: Railtrack

Key dates
- 26 January 2000: Opened

Passengers
- 2021/22: ▲0.110 million
- 2022/23: ▲0.140 million
- 2023/24: ▲0.184 million
- 2024/25: ▼0.130 million
- 2025/26: ▲0.222 million
Location
Notes
- Passenger statistics from the Office of Rail and Road

Dunfermline Queen Margaret railway station is a railway station in Dunfermline, Fife, Scotland. The station is managed by ScotRail and is on the Fife Circle Line, 18 1/2 miles (29.8 km) north of Edinburgh Waverley. The station takes its name from the nearby Queen Margaret Hospital. It is the longest railway station name in Scotland.

== History ==
The station was opened on 26 January 2000 by Railtrack and the former National Express franchisee, ScotRail. It is located at the east side of the former triangular junction formed by Touch North, Touch South and Townhill Junctions (where the now closed Stirling and Dunfermline Railway to Stirling via Alloa diverged), and serves the eastern side of Dunfermline. Passengers can only purchase tickets using a machine at the station. There is no ticket office or newsagents and only a small covered waiting area, although there is a fairly large car park with 93 spaces and two electric vehicle charging points.

== Services ==
There is a half-hourly service to/from Edinburgh (southbound) & Cowdenbeath (northbound) one train per hour continuing to Leven. On Sundays, an hourly service runs in each direction. A single evening service runs through to Perth all week, though the Sunday service runs earlier than its weekday/Saturday equivalent.

Preceding station	National Rail	Following station
Dunfermline City	ScotRail; Fife Circle Line	Cowdenbeath

== Bibliography ==
- Brailsford, Martyn, ed. (December 2017) [1987]. Railway Track Diagrams 1: Scotland & Isle of Man (6th ed.). Frome: Trackmaps. ISBN 978-0-9549866-9-8.
- Jowett, Alan (March 1989). Jowett's Railway Atlas of Great Britain and Ireland: From Pre-Grouping to the Present Day (1st ed.). Sparkford: Patrick Stephens Ltd. ISBN 978-1-85260-086-0. OCLC 22311137.
- RAILSCOT on Dunfermline Branch of Edinburgh and Northern Railway
