= Dunfermline Upper railway station =

Disused railway station in Dunfermline, Fife

Dunfermline Upper

General information
- Location: Dunfermline, Fife; Scotland
- Coordinates: 56.0735°N 3.457°W
- Grid reference: NT094876
- Platforms: 2

Other information
- Status: Disused

History
- Original company: Edinburgh and Glasgow Railway
- Pre-grouping: North British Railway
- Post-grouping: LNER; British Rail (Scottish Region)

Key dates
- 13 December 1849: Opened as Dunfermline
- 2 June 1890: Name changed to Dunfermline Upper
- 7 October 1968: Closed
Location

Dunfermline Upper railway station served the town (now city) of Dunfermline, Fife, Scotland from 1849 to 1968 on the Stirling and Dunfermline Railway.

== History ==
The station opened on 13 December 1849 by the Edinburgh and Glasgow Railway. To the north was the goods yard which had a large goods shed and sidings. There was also a locomotive shed to the east which was later replaced. The station had two signal boxes, one to the east and the other to the west which were opened in 1880. The east signal box was replaced in 1916 and it replaced the west signal box in 1927. The station's name was changed to Dunfermline Upper on 2 June 1890 to distinguish it from Dunfermline Lower. The station closed on 7 October 1968. The track through the station continued to be used by coal trains from Oakley Colliery until 1986. The track was removed in 1993, the station was demolished and the land sold. The former station area became a retail and business park.

Preceding station	Disused railways	Following station
Oakley (Fife); Line and station closed	Stirling and Dunfermline Railway	Terminus
