= List of listed buildings in St Monans, Fife =

This is a list of listed buildings in the parish of St Monans in Fife, Scotland.

== List ==
Name	Location	Date listed	Grid ref. (Note: Sometimes known as OSGB36, the grid reference (where provided) is based on the British national grid reference system used by the Ordnance Survey. • "Guide to National Grid". Ordnance Survey. • "Get-a-map". Ordnance Survey.)	Geo-coordinates	Notes	LB number (Note: Historic Environment Scotland assign a unique alphanumeric identifier to each designated site in Scotland, for listed buildings this always begins with "LB", for example "LB12345".)	Image
11 And 12 West Shore				56°12′18″N 2°45′59″W	Category C(S)	40972	Upload another image
17 West Shore				56°12′17″N 2°46′00″W	Category C(S)	40976	Upload another image
5 Cribbs, Mid Shore				56°12′19″N 2°45′54″W	Category B	40987	Upload Photo
8 Mid Shore				56°12′18″N 2°45′52″W	Category B	40993	Upload another image
17 Station Road Including Garden Wall To Station Road				56°12′21″N 2°45′54″W	Category B	41006	Upload Photo
15 And 17 West Street				56°12′19″N 2°45′58″W	Category C(S)	41020	Upload Photo
6 West Street				56°12′19″N 2°45′56″W	Category C(S)	41023	Upload Photo
18 East Street				56°12′19″N 2°45′52″W	Category C(S)	41029	Upload Photo
10 Forth Street				56°12′18″N 2°45′47″W	Category C(S)	41045	Upload another image
9 West End				56°12′16″N 2°46′04″W	Category C(S)	40942	Upload another image
13 West End				56°12′15″N 2°46′05″W	Category C(S)	40944	Upload another image
14 West End				56°12′15″N 2°46′05″W	Category C(S)	40950	Upload Photo
3 West Shore				56°12′18″N 2°45′57″W	Category B	40968	Upload Photo
18 West Shore				56°12′17″N 2°46′01″W	Category C(S)	40977	Upload another image
21 West Shore				56°12′17″N 2°46′02″W	Category B	40978	Upload another image
1 East Shore				56°12′18″N 2°45′48″W	Category B	40995	Upload Photo
2 And 3 East Shore				56°12′18″N 2°45′48″W	Category C(S)	40996	Upload another image
4 East Shore				56°12′18″N 2°45′47″W	Category C(S)	40997	Upload Photo
5, 6 And 7 East Shore				56°12′18″N 2°45′46″W	Category C(S)	40999	Upload another image
14 And 14A East Shore				56°12′18″N 2°45′44″W	Category C(S)	41002	Upload another image
4 Station Road				56°12′19″N 2°45′56″W	Category C(S)	41009	Upload another image
26-30 Station Road				56°12′22″N 2°45′56″W	Category B	41014	Upload Photo
2, 4 And 6 East Street				56°12′19″N 2°45′54″W	Category C(S)	41028	Upload Photo
42, 44 And 46 East Street				56°12′19″N 2°45′50″W	Category C(S)	41033	Upload Photo
48 And 50 East Street				56°12′19″N 2°45′50″W	Category C(S)	41034	Upload Photo
21 Forth Street				56°12′19″N 2°45′47″W	Category B	41044	Upload Photo
23 West End Cronan Na Mara				56°12′14″N 2°46′07″W	Category C(S)	40954	Upload another image
36 West End Inverie Including Garages And Outbuildings				56°12′14″N 2°46′14″W	Category B	40959	Upload Photo
2 West Shore				56°12′18″N 2°45′56″W	Category B	40967	Upload another image
Balcaskie House West Lodge And Gatepiers				56°13′09″N 2°47′20″W	Category B	15553	Upload Photo
St Monan's Church And Churchyard				56°12′11″N 2°46′16″W	Category A	15558	Upload another image
1 And 2 Mid Shore				56°12′18″N 2°45′55″W	Category B	40984	Upload another image
7 Mid Shore				56°12′18″N 2°45′52″W	Category C(S)	40992	Upload another image
5 East Shore And 4 Forth Street				56°12′18″N 2°45′47″W	Category C(S)	40998	Upload another image
15 East Shore				56°12′18″N 2°45′42″W	Category B	41003	Upload Photo
6-8 Station Road				56°12′19″N 2°45′56″W	Category C(S)	41010	Upload another image
14 Station Road				56°12′20″N 2°45′56″W	Category B	41011	Upload Photo
25 East Street				56°12′20″N 2°45′52″W	Category C(S)	41030	Upload Photo
12 Forth Street				56°12′18″N 2°45′47″W	Category C(S)	41046	Upload Photo
40 West End Burnside				56°12′13″N 2°46′15″W	Category C(S)	40961	Upload Photo
1 West Shore				56°12′18″N 2°45′56″W	Category B	40966	Upload Photo
5-7 West Shore				56°12′18″N 2°45′58″W	Category B	40970	Upload another image
16 West Shore				56°12′18″N 2°46′00″W	Category C(S)	40975	Upload Photo
24 West Shore				56°12′17″N 2°46′02″W	Category B	40980	Upload Photo
25 West Shore				56°12′17″N 2°46′03″W	Category C(S)	40981	Upload Photo
8 And 9 East Shore				56°12′18″N 2°45′46″W	Category C(S)	41000	Upload Photo
Parish Church Hall Station Road				56°12′24″N 2°45′57″W	Category B	41007	Upload Photo
22 Station Road				56°12′21″N 2°45′56″W	Category C(S)	41013	Upload Photo
7 And 8 Narrow Wynd				56°12′19″N 2°46′00″W	Category C(S)	41027	Upload Photo
5, 7 And 9 Forth Street				56°12′18″N 2°45′49″W	Category C(S)	41039	Upload Photo
15 West End				56°12′15″N 2°46′05″W	Category C(S)	40945	Upload Photo
17 West End				56°12′15″N 2°46′06″W	Category C(S)	40946	Upload Photo
8-10 West Shore				56°12′18″N 2°45′58″W	Category C(S)	40971	Upload Photo
27 West Shore				56°12′17″N 2°46′03″W	Category C(S)	40983	Upload another image
2 Cribbs, Mid Shore				56°12′18″N 2°45′54″W	Category B	40988	Upload Photo
6 Mid Shore				56°12′18″N 2°45′53″W	Category C(S)	40991	Upload Photo
1 And 3 Station Road				56°12′19″N 2°45′55″W	Category B	41004	Upload Photo
5 And 7 Station Road				56°12′19″N 2°45′55″W	Category B	41005	Upload Photo
35 George Terrace Including Garden Walls And Outbuilding				56°12′22″N 2°45′55″W	Category B	41015	Upload Photo
Montador Brothers Building, West Street				56°12′19″N 2°45′58″W	Category C(S)	41024	Upload Photo
19 Forth Street				56°12′19″N 2°45′47″W	Category B	41043	Upload Photo
8 West End				56°12′16″N 2°46′04″W	Category C(S)	40948	Upload Photo
25 West End Rockslea				56°12′14″N 2°46′07″W	Category C(S)	40955	Upload another image
34 West End				56°12′13″N 2°46′11″W	Category C(S)	40957	Upload another image
41 And 42 West End Burnside				56°12′13″N 2°46′14″W	Category C(S)	40962	Upload Photo
Clapper Bridge Over Inweary Or St Monance Burn				56°12′12″N 2°46′14″W	Category B	40964	Upload Photo
Newark Farmhouse Garden Walls And Gatepiers				56°12′11″N 2°46′39″W	Category C(S)	15555	Upload Photo
26 West Shore				56°12′17″N 2°46′03″W	Category C(S)	40982	Upload Photo
1 Cribbs, Mid Shore				56°12′18″N 2°45′54″W	Category B	40985	Upload Photo
12 And 13 East Shore				56°12′18″N 2°45′45″W	Category C(S)	41001	Upload Photo
1 And 3 Forth Street				56°12′18″N 2°45′49″W	Category B	41038	Upload Photo
17 Forth Street				56°12′19″N 2°45′48″W	Category B	41042	Upload Photo
4 And 5 West End				56°12′16″N 2°46′04″W	Category C(S)	40941	Upload Photo
18 West End				56°12′15″N 2°46′05″W	Category C(S)	40952	Upload another image
32 West End				56°12′13″N 2°46′09″W	Category C(S)	40956	Upload another image
St Monance Harbour				56°12′16″N 2°45′56″W	Category B	40965	Upload Photo
22 And 23 West Shore				56°12′17″N 2°46′02″W	Category B	40979	Upload Photo
3 Cribbs, Mid Shore				56°12′19″N 2°45′54″W	Category C(S)	40986	Upload Photo
4 And 5 Mid Shore				56°12′18″N 2°45′54″W	Category B	40990	Upload Photo
12 Mid Shore Royal Bank Of Scotland				56°12′18″N 2°45′50″W	Category C(S)	40994	Upload Photo
2 Station Road				56°12′19″N 2°45′56″W	Category C(S)	41008	Upload Photo
18 Station Road				56°12′20″N 2°45′56″W	Category C(S)	41012	Upload Photo
5 West Street				56°12′20″N 2°45′57″W	Category C(S)	41018	Upload Photo
Braeside Baptist Hall, West Street				56°12′19″N 2°45′57″W	Category C(S)	41021	Upload Photo
6 Narrow Wynd, Davidson's Buildings				56°12′19″N 2°46′00″W	Category C(S)	41026	Upload Photo
8 And 9 Virgin Square				56°12′19″N 2°45′50″W	Category B	41036	Upload Photo
10 Virgin Square				56°12′19″N 2°45′50″W	Category B	41037	Upload Photo
2 And 3 West End				56°12′17″N 2°46′04″W	Category C(S)	40940	Upload Photo
35 West End Rockview				56°12′13″N 2°46′12″W	Category C(S)	40958	Upload Photo
Wash-House Of 40 West End, Burnside				56°12′13″N 2°46′15″W	Category C(S)	40963	Upload Photo
13 West Shore				56°12′18″N 2°45′59″W	Category C(S)	40973	Upload Photo
14 And 15 West Street				56°12′19″N 2°45′59″W	Category C(S)	40974	Upload Photo
4 Cribbs, Mid Shore				56°12′19″N 2°45′54″W	Category B	40989	Upload Photo
32 And 33 Braeheads Including Outbuildings				56°12′17″N 2°46′05″W	Category C(S)	41016	Upload Photo
3 West Street				56°12′20″N 2°45′56″W	Category C(S)	41017	Upload Photo
7 And 9 West Street				56°12′20″N 2°45′57″W	Category C(S)	41019	Upload Photo
2 And 4 West Street				56°12′19″N 2°45′56″W	Category B	41022	Upload Photo
Narrow Wynd And West Street, Town Council Flats And Stores				56°12′19″N 2°45′59″W	Category C(S)	41025	Upload Photo
27 East Street				56°12′20″N 2°45′51″W	Category C(S)	41031	Upload Photo
7 Virgin Square				56°12′19″N 2°45′52″W	Category C(S)	41035	Upload Photo
11 Forth Street				56°12′19″N 2°45′48″W	Category C(S)	41040	Upload Photo
13 And 15 Forth Street				56°12′19″N 2°45′48″W	Category C(S)	41041	Upload Photo
14 And 16 Forth Street And 1 And 3 Rose Street				56°12′19″N 2°45′46″W	Category B	41047	Upload another image
11 West End				56°12′16″N 2°46′05″W	Category C(S)	40943	Upload Photo
19 West End				56°12′15″N 2°46′06″W	Category C(S)	40947	Upload Photo
12 West End, Seaforth				56°12′15″N 2°46′04″W	Category C(S)	40949	Upload Photo
16 West End The Cabin Bar				56°12′15″N 2°46′05″W	Category C(S)	40951	Upload Photo
21 And 22 West End				56°12′15″N 2°46′06″W	Category C(S)	40953	Upload Photo
39 West End Burnside				56°12′13″N 2°46′15″W	Category B	40960	Upload Photo
The Dolphin 4 West Shore Including Block Of Garages At Rear				56°12′18″N 2°45′57″W	Category B	40969	Upload Photo

== Key ==
The scheme for classifying buildings in Scotland is:

- Category A: "buildings of national or international importance, either architectural or historic; or fine, little-altered examples of some particular period, style or building type."
- Category B: "buildings of regional or more than local importance; or major examples of some particular period, style or building type, which may have been altered."
- Category C: "buildings of local importance; lesser examples of any period, style, or building type, as originally constructed or moderately altered; and simple traditional buildings which group well with other listed buildings."

In March 2016 there were 47,288 listed buildings in Scotland. Of these, 8% were Category A, and 50% were Category B, with the remaining 42% being Category C.

== See also ==
- List of listed buildings in Fife
