= List of listed buildings in Collessie, Fife =

This is a consolidated list of listed buildings in the parish of Collessie in Fife, Scotland.

== List ==
| Name | Location | Date listed | Grid ref. (Note: Sometimes known as OSGB36, the grid reference (where provided) is based on the British national grid reference system used by the Ordnance Survey. • "Guide to National Grid". Ordnance Survey. • "Get-a-map". Ordnance Survey.) | Geo-coordinates | Notes | LB number (Note: Historic Environment Scotland assign a unique alphanumeric identifier to each designated site in Scotland, for listed buildings this always begins with "LB", for example "LB12345".) | Image |
|---|---|---|---|---|---|---|---|
| Estate Cottage To North Of Kinloch Farm | | | | 56°17′50″N 3°09′45″W | Category B | 4303 | Upload Photo |
| Charlottetown Woodside Cottages (North Cottage Only) | | | | 56°17′02″N 3°08′43″W | Category C(S) | 2439 | Upload Photo |
| Daft Mill Cart Shed | | | | 56°17′51″N 3°06′15″W | Category C(S) | 2451 | Upload Photo |
| Trafalgar Cornhill Farmhouse | | | | 56°18′17″N 3°09′56″W | Category B | 2458 | Upload Photo |
| Collessie Village Collessie Parish, Kirk | | | | 56°18′22″N 3°09′19″W | Category B | 2463 | Upload another image |
| Collessie Village Outbuilding To Rear Of The Glebe | | | | 56°18′22″N 3°09′17″W | Category C(S) | 2466 | Upload Photo |
| Lochieheads House | | | | 56°18′17″N 3°12′27″W | Category C(S) | 2481 | Upload Photo |
| Newton Of Collessie Walled Garden To Farmhouse | | | | 56°18′14″N 3°08′44″W | Category C(S) | 2489 | Upload Photo |
| Newton Of Collessie - Steading And Farmbuildings | | | | 56°18′17″N 3°08′47″W | Category B | 2490 | Upload Photo |
| Bowhouse Farmhouse | | | | 56°16′38″N 3°10′50″W | Category C(S) | 2435 | Upload Photo |
| Charlottetown Former United Free Church Hall | | | | 56°17′02″N 3°08′41″W | Category C(S) | 2438 | Upload Photo |
| Trafalgar Collessie Primary School | | | | 56°18′13″N 3°09′42″W | Category B | 2457 | Upload Photo |
| Charlottetown Woodside House | | | | 56°17′04″N 3°08′44″W | Category C(S) | 2462 | Upload Photo |
| Collessie Village Lomondview | | | | 56°18′21″N 3°09′21″W | Category C(S) | 2471 | Upload Photo |
| Collessie Village West End (Mrs Scott And Mrs Watt) | | | | 56°18′20″N 3°09′27″W | Category B | 2474 | Upload Photo |
| Ladybank Station, Carriage Shed And Workshops | | | | 56°16′41″N 3°07′21″W | Category B | 2478 | Upload Photo |
| Ladybank Station Former Lodge And Ticket Office On East Platform | | | | 56°16′25″N 3°07′16″W | Category B | 2479 | Upload Photo |
| Lochieheads House Stable Block | | | | 56°18′17″N 3°12′29″W | Category C(S) | 2482 | Upload Photo |
| Melville Home Farm | | | | 56°18′31″N 3°08′16″W | Category B | 2485 | Upload Photo |
| Giffordtown, Easter Kilwhiss, Bridge Over Rossie Drain | | | | 56°16′48″N 3°10′09″W | Category C(S) | 47153 | Upload Photo |
| Rustic Summerhouse North Of Kinloch Farm | | | | 56°17′50″N 3°09′44″W | Category C(S) | 4304 | Upload Photo |
| Cairnfield Farm Steadings | | | | 56°17′06″N 3°07′55″W | Category C(S) | 2436 | Upload Photo |
| Trafalgar Cornhill Farm Steadings | | | | 56°18′19″N 3°09′55″W | Category B | 2459 | Upload Photo |
| Collessie Village Collessie Kirkyard Dyke | | | | 56°18′21″N 3°09′19″W | Category B | 2464 | Upload Photo |
| Collessie Village Sunnyview | | | | 56°18′22″N 3°09′21″W | Category C(S) | 2467 | Upload Photo |
| Collessie Village Washhouse Property Of Mr Stark, Lomondview | | | | 56°18′21″N 3°09′22″W | Category C(S) | 2476 | Upload Photo |
| Rossie Farm Steadings And Outbuildings | | | | 56°17′58″N 3°12′10″W | Category B | 2499 | Upload Photo |
| Gatepiers And Walls At West Lodge, Ladybank Road | | | | 56°16′24″N 3°07′13″W | Category B | 2526 | Upload Photo |
| Collessie Village Cottage Adjoining Sunnyview | | | | 56°18′22″N 3°09′20″W | Category C(S) | 2468 | Upload Photo |
| Collessie Village Ivy Cottage And Garden House | | | | 56°18′23″N 3°09′21″W | Category C(S) | 2469 | Upload Photo |
| Kinloch House, North Lodge | | | | 56°18′02″N 3°09′43″W | Category C(S) | 2477 | Upload Photo |
| Newton Of Collessie Farmhouse | | | | 56°18′14″N 3°08′47″W | Category B | 2488 | Upload Photo |
| Rossie Farmhouse | | | | 56°17′56″N 3°12′08″W | Category B | 2498 | Upload Photo |
| Kinloch Former Lodge House | | | | 56°17′50″N 3°09′42″W | Category C(S) | 2522 | Upload Photo |
| Kinloch House, Dovecote | | | | 56°17′46″N 3°09′53″W | Category B | 4305 | Upload Photo |
| Annsmuir House, Horsemill | | | | 56°17′18″N 3°06′39″W | Category B | 2434 | Upload Photo |
| Collessie Village Washhouse Property Of Braehead | | | | 56°18′21″N 3°09′22″W | Category C(S) | 2447 | Upload Photo |
| Easter Kilwhiss Farm Range Of Steadings And Cart Shed | | | | 56°17′01″N 3°09′58″W | Category B | 2452 | Upload Photo |
| Edenbank Roadbridge (A914) | | | | 56°15′51″N 3°08′33″W | Category C(S) | 2453 | Upload Photo |
| Heatherinch Farm, Barn, Ladybank Road | | | | 56°16′18″N 3°07′12″W | Category C(S) | 2454 | Upload Photo |
| Kinloch Farmhouse And Offices | | | | 56°17′47″N 3°09′42″W | Category B | 2456 | Upload Photo |
| Lumquat Mill And Cottage | | | | 56°18′34″N 3°14′03″W | Category C(S) | 2484 | Upload Photo |
| Shiells/Lathrisk Roadbridge (Unclassified Road) | | | | 56°15′51″N 3°09′29″W | Category C(S) | 2500 | Upload Photo |
| Collessie Village Strad Cottage And Manse Gates | | | | 56°18′22″N 3°09′15″W | Category C(S) | 153 | Upload Photo |
| Collessie Village Lomond View (Mr Stark) | | | | 56°18′21″N 3°09′20″W | Category C(S) | 154 | Upload Photo |
| Meadowwells House Outbuilding | | | | 56°18′26″N 3°10′40″W | Category C(S) | 4307 | Upload Photo |
| Collessie Village The Wee Hoose In Grounds Of Cedar House | | | | 56°18′22″N 3°09′11″W | Category B | 2449 | Upload Photo |
| Kinloch House | | | | 56°17′52″N 3°09′55″W | Category B | 2455 | Upload Photo |
| Trafalgar The Smithy | | | | 56°18′12″N 3°09′49″W | Category C(S) | 2461 | Upload Photo |
| Collessie Village Braehead | | | | 56°18′21″N 3°09′20″W | Category B | 2470 | Upload Photo |
| Melville House Dovecote | | | | 56°18′04″N 3°07′42″W | Category B | 2486 | Upload another image |
| Pitlair House | | | | 56°17′46″N 3°06′05″W | Category B | 2492 | Upload Photo |
| Pitlair House Pair Of Gatepiers At South Driveway | | | | 56°17′39″N 3°05′53″W | Category C(S) | 2494 | Upload Photo |
| Rankeilour Bridge Over Rankeilour Burn At No 3276 1186 | | | | 56°17′40″N 3°05′16″W | Category C(S) | 2495 | Upload Photo |
| Meadowwells House | | | | 56°18′26″N 3°10′38″W | Category C(S) | 4306 | Upload Photo |
| Collessie Village Station House | | | | 56°18′27″N 3°09′25″W | Category B | 2473 | Upload Photo |
| Ladybank Station (East Block) | | | | 56°16′27″N 3°07′17″W | Category B | 2480 | Upload Photo |
| Melville Muir Cottages | | | | 56°17′34″N 3°06′45″W | Category C(S) | 2487 | Upload Photo |
| West Lodge Ladybank Road | | | | 56°16′25″N 3°07′13″W | Category C(S) | 2525 | Upload Photo |
| Bridge Over Rankeilour Burn At No 3326 1098 | | | | 56°17′12″N 3°04′46″W | Category C(S) | 45596 | Upload Photo |
| Cairnfield Cottages | | | | 56°17′04″N 3°07′55″W | Category C(S) | 2437 | Upload Photo |
| Collessie Village Southview (Mrs Rennie) | | | | 56°18′20″N 3°09′25″W | Category C(S) | 2448 | Upload Photo |
| Daft Mill And Farm Buildings | | | | 56°17′50″N 3°06′15″W | Category B | 2450 | Upload Photo |
| Trafalgar Smithy House | | | | 56°18′13″N 3°09′50″W | Category C(S) | 2460 | Upload Photo |
| Collessie Village The Glebe | | | | 56°18′21″N 3°09′17″W | Category B | 2465 | Upload Photo |
| Collessie Village Rose Cottage | | | | 56°18′23″N 3°09′23″W | Category B | 2472 | Upload Photo |
| Collessie Village Washhouse Mrs Watt, West End | | | | 56°18′20″N 3°09′26″W | Category C(S) | 2475 | Upload Photo |
| Lumquat Farmhouse | | | | 56°18′36″N 3°13′32″W | Category C(S) | 2483 | Upload Photo |
| Pitlair Dovecot | | | | 56°17′44″N 3°06′12″W | Category B | 2493 | Upload Photo |
| Rossie House | | | | 56°17′44″N 3°11′20″W | Category B | 2496 | Upload another image |
| Rossie House Home Farm Cartshed | | | | 56°17′45″N 3°11′19″W | Category B | 2497 | Upload Photo |
| Weddersbie Farmhouse | | | | 56°18′15″N 3°11′44″W | Category C(S) | 2523 | Upload Photo |
| Wellwood House Ladybank Road | | | | 56°16′17″N 3°07′07″W | Category C(S) | 2524 | Upload Photo |

== Key ==
The scheme for classifying buildings in Scotland is:

- Category A: "buildings of national or international importance, either architectural or historic; or fine, little-altered examples of some particular period, style or building type."
- Category B: "buildings of regional or more than local importance; or major examples of some particular period, style or building type, which may have been altered."
- Category C: "buildings of local importance; lesser examples of any period, style, or building type, as originally constructed or moderately altered; and simple traditional buildings which group well with other listed buildings."

In March 2016 there were 47,288 listed buildings in Scotland. Of these, 8% were Category A, and 50% were Category B, with the remaining 42% being Category C.

== See also ==
- List of listed buildings in Fife
