= List of listed buildings in Abdie, Fife =

This is a list of listed buildings in the parish of Abdie in Fife, Scotland.

== List ==
Name	Location	Date listed	Grid ref. (Note: Sometimes known as OSGB36, the grid reference (where provided) is based on the British national grid reference system used by the Ordnance Survey. • "Guide to National Grid". Ordnance Survey. • "Get-a-map". Ordnance Survey.)	Geo-coordinates	Notes	LB number (Note: Historic Environment Scotland assign a unique alphanumeric identifier to each designated site in Scotland, for listed buildings this always begins with "LB", for example "LB12345".)	Image
Abdie Parish Kirk				56°20′12″N 3°12′13″W	Category B	2560	Upload another image
Inchrye Steading				56°20′23″N 3°10′52″W	Category B	45921	Upload Photo
Approach To Abdie Kirk Yard, Gate, 2 Flanking Buildings, And Kirkyard				56°20′01″N 3°11′57″W	Category B	2561	Upload another image
Craigmill - Meal Mill				56°20′51″N 3°13′23″W	Category B	2563	Upload Photo
Craigmill - Miller's House				56°20′51″N 3°13′22″W	Category C(S)	2564	Upload Photo
Berryhill House				56°19′49″N 3°12′02″W	Category B	2590	Upload Photo
Halton Hill Steading				56°19′54″N 3°13′20″W	Category B	2591	Upload Photo
Abdie Cottage And Kirk Style				56°20′02″N 3°11′58″W	Category C(S)	2580	Upload Photo
Parkhill Mill				56°21′12″N 3°13′23″W	Category B	2565	Upload another image
Parkhill Steading				56°21′13″N 3°13′21″W	Category C(S)	2566	Upload Photo
Lindores House				56°20′14″N 3°11′31″W	Category B	2581	Upload Photo
Kinnaird House				56°20′39″N 3°10′43″W	Category B	2587	Upload Photo
Abdie House, (Former Abdie Manse)				56°19′59″N 3°11′56″W	Category B	2562	Upload Photo
"Roselea" And "Ivy Cottage", Lindores				56°20′19″N 3°11′26″W	Category B	2584	Upload Photo
Halton Hill Farmhouse With Boundary Walls				56°19′54″N 3°13′20″W	Category C(S)	43476	Upload Photo
Inchrye Lodge				56°19′58″N 3°10′41″W	Category B	2588	Upload another image
Abdie Curling Club House, Lecturer's Inch, Lindores Loch, Near Newburgh				56°20′10″N 3°11′50″W	Category B	52182	Upload Photo

== Key ==
The scheme for classifying buildings in Scotland is:

- Category A: "buildings of national or international importance, either architectural or historic; or fine, little-altered examples of some particular period, style or building type."
- Category B: "buildings of regional or more than local importance; or major examples of some particular period, style or building type, which may have been altered."
- Category C: "buildings of local importance; lesser examples of any period, style, or building type, as originally constructed or moderately altered; and simple traditional buildings which group well with other listed buildings."

In March 2016 there were 47,288 listed buildings in Scotland. Of these, 8% were Category A, and 50% were Category B, with the remaining 42% being Category C.

== See also ==
- List of listed buildings in Fife
