= List of listed buildings in Fife =

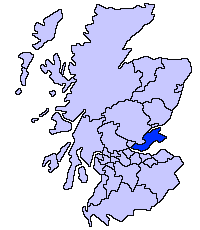
Fife shown within Scotland

This is a list of listed buildings in Fife. The list is split out by parish.

- List of listed buildings in Abdie, Fife
- List of listed buildings in Aberdour, Fife
- List of listed buildings in Anstruther Wester, Fife
- List of listed buildings in Auchterderran, Fife
- List of listed buildings in Auchtermuchty, Fife
- List of listed buildings in Auchtertool, Fife
- List of listed buildings in Ballingry, Fife
- List of listed buildings in Balmerino, Fife
- List of listed buildings in Beath, Fife
- List of listed buildings in Buckhaven And Methil, Fife
- List of listed buildings in Burntisland, Fife
- List of listed buildings in Cameron, Fife
- List of listed buildings in Carnbee, Fife
- List of listed buildings in Carnock, Fife
- List of listed buildings in Ceres, Fife
- List of listed buildings in Collessie, Fife
- List of listed buildings in Cowdenbeath, Fife
- List of listed buildings in Crail, Fife
- List of listed buildings in Creich, Fife
- List of listed buildings in Culross, Fife
- List of listed buildings in Cults, Fife
- List of listed buildings in Cupar, Fife
- List of listed buildings in Dairsie, Fife
- List of listed buildings in Dalgety, Fife
- List of listed buildings in Dunbog, Fife
- List of listed buildings in Dunfermline, Fife
- List of listed buildings in Dunino, Fife
- List of listed buildings in Elie And Earlsferry, Fife
- List of listed buildings in Elie, Fife
- List of listed buildings in Falkland, Fife
- List of listed buildings in Ferry-Port-On-Craig, Fife
- List of listed buildings in Flisk, Fife
- List of listed buildings in Forgan, Fife
- List of listed buildings in Inverkeithing, Fife
- List of listed buildings in Kemback, Fife
- List of listed buildings in Kennoway, Fife
- List of listed buildings in Kettle, Fife
- List of listed buildings in Kilconquhar, Fife
- List of listed buildings in Kilmany, Fife
- List of listed buildings in Kilrenny, Fife
- List of listed buildings in Kinghorn, Fife
- List of listed buildings in Kinglassie, Fife
- List of listed buildings in Kingsbarns, Fife
- List of listed buildings in Kirkcaldy And Dysart, Fife
- List of listed buildings in Kirkcaldy, Fife
- List of listed buildings in Ladybank, Fife
- List of listed buildings in Largo, Fife
- List of listed buildings in Leslie, Fife
- List of listed buildings in Leuchars, Fife
- List of listed buildings in Leven, Fife
- List of listed buildings in Lochgelly, Fife
- List of listed buildings in Logie, Fife
- List of listed buildings in Markinch, Fife
- List of listed buildings in Monimail, Fife
- List of listed buildings in Moonzie, Fife
- List of listed buildings in Newburgh, Fife
- List of listed buildings in Newburn, Fife
- List of listed buildings in Newport-On-Tay, Fife
- List of listed buildings in Pittenweem, Fife
- List of listed buildings in Saline, Fife
- List of listed buildings in Scoonie, Fife
- List of listed buildings in St Andrews And St Leonards, Fife
- List of listed buildings in St Andrews, Fife
- List of listed buildings in St Monance, Fife
- List of listed buildings in Strathmiglo, Fife
- List of listed buildings in Tayport, Fife
- List of listed buildings in Torryburn, Fife
- List of listed buildings in Tulliallan, Fife
- List of listed buildings in Wemyss, Fife

== See also ==
- Scheduled monuments in Fife
