= List of listed buildings in Leven, Fife =

This is a list of listed buildings in the parish of Leven in Fife, Scotland.

== List ==
Name	Location	Date listed	Grid ref. (Note: Sometimes known as OSGB36, the grid reference (where provided) is based on the British national grid reference system used by the Ordnance Survey. • "Guide to National Grid". Ordnance Survey. • "Get-a-map". Ordnance Survey.)	Geo-coordinates	Notes	LB number (Note: Historic Environment Scotland assign a unique alphanumeric identifier to each designated site in Scotland, for listed buildings this always begins with "LB", for example "LB12345".)	Image
Victoria Road And Durie Street, Scoonie Parish Church (Church Of Scotland) With Boundary Walls, Gatepiers And Gates				56°11′51″N 2°59′44″W	Category B	37346	Upload Photo
40 High Street And Bank Street, Tsb With Gatepiers, Boundary Walls And Railings				56°11′41″N 2°59′52″W	Category B	46500	Upload Photo
23 Durie Street, Bianco's (Formerly The Hunting Lodge)				56°11′47″N 2°59′44″W	Category C(S)	37348	Upload Photo
Forth Street And Viewforth Place, Greig Institute With Boundary Walls				56°11′40″N 2°59′46″W	Category B	37349	Upload Photo
Durie Street, Carlow Memorial Hall, St Andrews Parish Church Hall				56°11′49″N 2°59′43″W	Category C(S)	46493	Upload Photo
Glenlyon Road, The Millfield				56°11′53″N 3°00′25″W	Category C(S)	46498	Upload Photo
4 And 6 High Street				56°11′38″N 2°59′55″W	Category C(S)	46499	Upload Photo
Durie Street, St Peter's Roman Catholic Church				56°11′48″N 2°59′43″W	Category B	46495	Upload Photo
82 High Street And North Street				56°11′44″N 2°59′48″W	Category C(S)	46503	Upload Photo
Letham Glen, Entrance Gate And Gates				56°12′13″N 2°59′50″W	Category C(S)	46504	Upload Photo
Links Road, Ballindalloch				56°11′50″N 2°59′34″W	Category C(S)	46505	Upload Photo
Linnwood Hall				56°12′11″N 3°00′46″W	Category B	46508	Upload Photo
Scoonie Brae, Scoonie Cemetery, Christie Burial Enclosure, Gravestones, Boundary Walls, Gatepiers And Gates				56°12′13″N 2°59′44″W	Category C(S)	37351	Upload Photo
Durie Street And Waggon Road, Former Co-Operative Building				56°11′47″N 2°59′46″W	Category C(S)	37353	Upload Photo
14 And 16 Durie Street, Leven Library				56°11′47″N 2°59′47″W	Category C(S)	46490	Upload Photo
Durie Street, St Andrew's Parish Church And Bain Hall, With Boundary Walls And Gatepiers				56°11′52″N 2°59′38″W	Category B	46494	Upload Photo
2 Forth Street, Bank Of Scotland Building And Forth House				56°11′43″N 2°59′47″W	Category C(S)	46497	Upload Photo
68 And 70 High Street, Royal British Legion				56°11′43″N 2°59′49″W	Category C(S)	46501	Upload Photo
Links Road, Deeside				56°11′51″N 2°59′27″W	Category C(S)	46506	Upload Photo
Links Road, Scoonie Manse With Boundary Walls				56°11′47″N 2°59′34″W	Category C(S)	46507	Upload Photo
Sawmill Bridge Over River Leven				56°11′40″N 3°00′31″W	Category C(S)	46512	Upload another image
Largo Road, Obertal (Formerly Nia-Roo) With Boundary Walls				56°12′26″N 2°59′20″W	Category B	37352	Upload Photo
Parkhill, Parkhill Primary School With Boundary Walls And Gates				56°11′45″N 3°00′00″W	Category C(S)	46511	Upload Photo
Durie Street, Carberry House, Sundial				56°11′56″N 2°59′36″W	Category B	37350	Upload Photo
17-19 (Odd Nos) Commercial Road, Gala Bingo, Former Regent Picture House				56°11′45″N 2°59′52″W	Category C(S)	46489	Upload Photo
Durie Street, Former Co-Operative Store				56°11′49″N 2°59′45″W	Category C(S)	46491	Upload Photo
Durie Street, Carberry House With Walled Garden And Boundary Walls				56°11′57″N 2°59′36″W	Category B	46492	Upload Photo
Durie Street And Victoria Road, War Memorial And Garden				56°11′51″N 2°59′43″W	Category C(S)	46496	Upload Photo
74, 76 And 76A High Street				56°11′43″N 2°59′49″W	Category C(S)	46502	Upload Photo
Victoria Road, St Margaret's Queen Of Scotland Episcopal Church With Boundary Walls				56°11′51″N 2°59′48″W	Category B	37347	Upload Photo
Church Road, White Memorial Baptist Church With Gatepier, Gates And Boundary Walls				56°11′50″N 2°59′34″W	Category C(S)	46488	Upload Photo
Linnwood Hall, Lodge House, Gatepiers And Boundary Walls				56°12′03″N 3°00′39″W	Category C(S)	46509	Upload Photo
Linnwood Hall, Walled Garden Including Gate				56°12′13″N 3°00′42″W	Category C(S)	46510	Upload Photo
Shorehead, The Corner, Barron				56°11′37″N 2°59′55″W	Category C(S)	46513	Upload Photo

== Key ==
The scheme for classifying buildings in Scotland is:

- Category A: "buildings of national or international importance, either architectural or historic; or fine, little-altered examples of some particular period, style or building type."
- Category B: "buildings of regional or more than local importance; or major examples of some particular period, style or building type, which may have been altered."
- Category C: "buildings of local importance; lesser examples of any period, style, or building type, as originally constructed or moderately altered; and simple traditional buildings which group well with other listed buildings."

In March 2016 there were 47,288 listed buildings in Scotland. Of these, 8% were Category A, and 50% were Category B, with the remaining 42% being Category C.

== See also ==
- List of listed buildings in Fife
