= List of listed buildings in Kingsbarns, Fife =

This is a list of listed buildings in the parish of Kingsbarns in Fife, Scotland.

== List ==
Name	Location	Date listed	Grid ref. (Note: Sometimes known as OSGB36, the grid reference (where provided) is based on the British national grid reference system used by the Ordnance Survey. • "Guide to National Grid". Ordnance Survey. • "Get-a-map". Ordnance Survey.)	Geo-coordinates	Notes	LB number (Note: Historic Environment Scotland assign a unique alphanumeric identifier to each designated site in Scotland, for listed buildings this always begins with "LB", for example "LB12345".)	Image
Briar Rose And Croft Cottage North Street				56°18′03″N 2°39′26″W	Category B	13694	Upload Photo
Randerston Farm				56°17′15″N 2°38′05″W	Category C(S)	8797	Upload Photo
Kingsbarns Parish Churchyard Sepulchral Monument To Corstorphines Of Kingsbarns				56°17′58″N 2°39′32″W	Category B	8710	Upload Photo
Kingsbarns Parish Church The Square And Main Street				56°17′58″N 2°39′34″W	Category B	8718	Upload another image See more images
Monypenny House Seagate				56°17′58″N 2°39′27″W	Category C(S)	8723	Upload Photo
St Anne's And South Quarter Cottages Seagate				56°17′59″N 2°39′25″W	Category C(S)	8724	Upload Photo
Crombie's Hall Main Street				56°17′54″N 2°39′35″W	Category C(S)	8730	Upload Photo
Cambo Arms Hotel Main Street Including Out-Buildings, Car Park Walls, And Gateway				56°17′59″N 2°39′34″W	Category B	8733	Upload Photo
South Quarter Farmhouse				56°17′53″N 2°39′27″W	Category B	8738	Upload Photo
Smithy House (Incorporating Former Smithy) Station Road				56°17′57″N 2°39′40″W	Category B	8751	Upload Photo
Kippo Doocot				56°17′08″N 2°41′01″W	Category B	8753	Upload Photo
Rose Cottage (Miss Scott) Including Garden Walls				56°17′56″N 2°39′26″W	Category C(S)	8776	Upload Photo
Former Joiner's Shop Now Farm Store Of South Quarter Farm				56°17′56″N 2°39′26″W	Category C(S)	8777	Upload Photo
Cambo Dovecot				56°17′32″N 2°38′48″W	Category B	8793	Upload Photo
Cambo Estate, Cambo House, Run Of Six Iron Footbridges Over Burn				56°17′39″N 2°38′28″W	Category B	13195	Upload another image
Kingsbarns Parish Churchyard The Square And Main Street				56°17′58″N 2°39′33″W	Category C(S)	8711	Upload another image
Woodside Cottage Back Style				56°17′56″N 2°39′22″W	Category C(S)	8716	Upload Photo
Cottages, Now Out-Buildings Of Cesneuk, Off Main Street And Square				56°17′56″N 2°39′31″W	Category B	8725	Upload Photo
Balmerino And The Old Hoose (Ha Boag) Main Street				56°17′54″N 2°39′32″W	Category C(S)	8729	Upload Photo
Parish Church Manse, Off Main Street, Including Garden Walls				56°17′52″N 2°39′36″W	Category B	8732	Upload Photo
Daisybank North Street				56°18′01″N 2°39′34″W	Category C(S)	8741	Upload Photo
Kippo Gatepiers				56°17′21″N 2°41′17″W	Category B	8754	Upload Photo
Pitmilly - North Lodge				56°18′47″N 2°41′02″W	Category C(S)	8755	Upload Photo
Garage, Formerly Cottage Croft Butts House North Street				56°18′03″N 2°39′29″W	Category B	8782	Upload Photo
The Grey House The Square Including Garden Walls And Out-Buildings				56°17′57″N 2°39′28″W	Category B	8720	Upload Photo
Dunholm And Mrs Blyth's Seagate				56°17′57″N 2°39′27″W	Category B	8721	Upload Photo
House (Mr Spence) Including Out-Buildings To Rear, Seagate				56°17′58″N 2°39′28″W	Category B	8722	Upload Photo
Hazeldean And No 9 Main Street				56°17′55″N 2°39′32″W	Category C(S)	8727	Upload Photo
The Old Forge North Street Including Garden Walls And Garage				56°18′03″N 2°39′27″W	Category C(S)	8742	Upload Photo
Westwood Cottage And Bon Accord The Square				56°17′57″N 2°39′29″W	Category B	8762	Upload Photo
4, 6 And 8 Lady Wynd				56°17′57″N 2°39′26″W	Category B	8778	Upload Photo
Cambo Stables And Walled Garden				56°17′32″N 2°38′31″W	Category B	8792	Upload Photo
Barns Cottage And Stella Maris (W B Anderson) The Square				56°17′58″N 2°39′31″W	Category C(S)	8714	Upload Photo
Dunstan Cottage (Wellers) Off Main Street				56°17′55″N 2°39′32″W	Category C(S)	8726	Upload Photo
North Quarter Steading Main Street				56°18′01″N 2°39′36″W	Category C(S)	8736	Upload Photo
Former Bakehouse Torrie House Off Station Road				56°18′00″N 2°39′38″W	Category B	8747	Upload Photo
No 1 The Pleasance Station Road				56°17′58″N 2°39′37″W	Category B	8748	Upload Photo
Cambo Farm				56°17′32″N 2°39′14″W	Category B	8757	Upload Photo
Cesneuk The Square				56°17′56″N 2°39′32″W	Category B	8760	Upload Photo
Cottages (Findlay And Hill) Lady Wynd				56°17′54″N 2°39′30″W	Category C(S)	8775	Upload Photo
Kingsbarns Parish Church - Session House The Square				56°17′57″N 2°39′34″W	Category C(S)	8719	Upload Photo
Cameron Cottage And Rosebank, Main Street				56°17′53″N 2°39′33″W	Category B	8731	Upload Photo
North Quarter House, Main Street, Including Garden Walls				56°17′59″N 2°39′36″W	Category B	8735	Upload Photo
South Quarter Farm Steading Including Farmyard Walls				56°17′54″N 2°39′28″W	Category B	8739	Upload Photo
Briar Cottages The Wynd				56°18′02″N 2°39′28″W	Category B	8744	Upload Photo
Retreat Cottage Bell's Wynd				56°18′01″N 2°39′27″W	Category B	8745	Upload Photo
Cambo Lodges And Gates				56°17′10″N 2°38′59″W	Category B	8758	Upload Photo
Cherry Cottage North Street				56°18′02″N 2°39′32″W	Category B	8780	Upload Photo
Boghall Farm, Byre				56°18′54″N 2°40′01″W	Category B	49657	Upload Photo
Kingsbarns School Main Street				56°17′55″N 2°39′35″W	Category B	13693	Upload Photo
Strathyre Main Street				56°17′54″N 2°39′32″W	Category B	8728	Upload Photo
The Library Main Street				56°18′00″N 2°39′36″W	Category B	8737	Upload Photo
Kingsbarns Smithy North Street				56°18′00″N 2°39′34″W	Category B	8740	Upload Photo
St Margaret's (Miss Robertson) The Wynd				56°18′02″N 2°39′29″W	Category C(S)	8743	Upload Photo
No 2 The Pleasance Garage Premises Station Road				56°17′58″N 2°39′38″W	Category C(S)	8750	Upload Photo
Cambo Mausoleum				56°17′24″N 2°38′50″W	Category B	8794	Upload Photo
East Newhall Farm				56°17′15″N 2°38′33″W	Category B	8795	Upload another image
Village Pump The Square				56°17′57″N 2°39′33″W	Category B	8712	Upload Photo
Wellgate, The Square Including Garden Walls				56°17′56″N 2°39′32″W	Category B	8715	Upload Photo
Kingsbarns Farm Main Street And North Street				56°18′02″N 2°39′35″W	Category B	8734	Upload Photo
No 2 The Pleasance Station Road				56°17′58″N 2°39′38″W	Category B	8749	Upload Photo
Hillhead Icehouse				56°18′56″N 2°40′57″W	Category C(S)	8756	Upload Photo
Cambo House				56°17′39″N 2°38′30″W	Category B	8759	Upload another image
Cottage, Kingsbarns Farm North Street				56°18′02″N 2°39′32″W	Category B	8779	Upload Photo
May Cottage North Street				56°18′02″N 2°39′32″W	Category B	8781	Upload Photo
Randerston Farm House				56°17′18″N 2°38′02″W	Category A	8796	Upload Photo
Schoolhouse The Square				56°17′58″N 2°39′31″W	Category B	8713	Upload Photo
Ladyville Lady Wynd				56°17′54″N 2°39′31″W	Category C(S)	8717	Upload Photo
Torrie House Off Station Road				56°18′00″N 2°39′38″W	Category B	8746	Upload Photo
Kippo Farmhouse				56°17′04″N 2°40′56″W	Category B	8752	Upload Photo
Kingsbarns House The Square Including Garden Walls And Out-Buildings				56°17′57″N 2°39′30″W	Category B	8761	Upload Photo

== Key ==
The scheme for classifying buildings in Scotland is:

- Category A: "buildings of national or international importance, either architectural or historic; or fine, little-altered examples of some particular period, style or building type."
- Category B: "buildings of regional or more than local importance; or major examples of some particular period, style or building type, which may have been altered."
- Category C: "buildings of local importance; lesser examples of any period, style, or building type, as originally constructed or moderately altered; and simple traditional buildings which group well with other listed buildings."

In March 2016 there were 47,288 listed buildings in Scotland. Of these, 8% were Category A, and 50% were Category B, with the remaining 42% being Category C.

== See also ==
- List of listed buildings in Fife
