= List of listed buildings in Moonzie, Fife =

This is a list of listed buildings in the parish of Moonzie in Fife, Scotland.

== List ==
Name	Location	Date listed	Grid ref. (Note: Sometimes known as OSGB36, the grid reference (where provided) is based on the British national grid reference system used by the Ordnance Survey. • "Guide to National Grid". Ordnance Survey. • "Get-a-map". Ordnance Survey.)	Geo-coordinates	Notes	LB number (Note: Historic Environment Scotland assign a unique alphanumeric identifier to each designated site in Scotland, for listed buildings this always begins with "LB", for example "LB12345".)	Image
Colluthie House				56°21′40″N 3°04′13″W	Category C(S)	15550	Upload Photo
Moonzie House (Former Manse Of Moonzie)				56°20′50″N 3°04′09″W	Category C(S)	15559	Upload Photo
Moonze Parish Kirk				56°20′46″N 3°04′19″W	Category B	15534	Upload another image
Moonzie School Including Water Pump And Well To South				56°20′37″N 3°03′36″W	Category C(S)	15547	Upload Photo
Colluthie Steading				56°21′39″N 3°04′14″W	Category C(S)	15551	Upload Photo

== Key ==
The scheme for classifying buildings in Scotland is:

- Category A: "buildings of national or international importance, either architectural or historic; or fine, little-altered examples of some particular period, style or building type."
- Category B: "buildings of regional or more than local importance; or major examples of some particular period, style or building type, which may have been altered."
- Category C: "buildings of local importance; lesser examples of any period, style, or building type, as originally constructed or moderately altered; and simple traditional buildings which group well with other listed buildings."

In March 2016 there were 47,288 listed buildings in Scotland. Of these, 8% were Category A, and 50% were Category B, with the remaining 42% being Category C.

== See also ==
- List of listed buildings in Fife
