= List of listed buildings in Tayport, Fife =

This is a list of listed buildings in the parish of Tayport in Fife, Scotland.

== List ==
Name	Location	Date listed	Grid ref. (Note: Sometimes known as OSGB36, the grid reference (where provided) is based on the British national grid reference system used by the Ordnance Survey. • "Guide to National Grid". Ordnance Survey. • "Get-a-map". Ordnance Survey.)	Geo-coordinates	Notes	LB number (Note: Historic Environment Scotland assign a unique alphanumeric identifier to each designated site in Scotland, for listed buildings this always begins with "LB", for example "LB12345".)	Image
Parish Kirk Of Ferryport-On-Craig Castle Street				56°26′51″N 2°52′44″W	Category B	41923	Upload another image
13 Rose Street				56°26′51″N 2°52′42″W	Category C(S)	41939	Upload Photo
14, 16, 18 Rose Street				56°26′48″N 2°52′40″W	Category C(S)	41941	Upload Photo
Harbour Cottages 17, 19, 21 Inn Street				56°27′07″N 2°53′01″W	Category B	41947	Upload Photo
7 - 21 Isla Place, Albert Place				56°27′05″N 2°53′05″W	Category C(S)	41948	Upload Photo
West Lighthouse And Attached Cottages, 7, 8 West Lights West Common				56°27′10″N 2°53′57″W	Category B	41953	Upload another image
11 Rose Street				56°26′51″N 2°52′42″W	Category C(S)	41938	Upload Photo
92 Tay Street				56°26′53″N 2°52′42″W	Category C(S)	41934	Upload Photo
20 Rose Street				56°26′47″N 2°52′40″W	Category C(S)	41942	Upload Photo
East Lighthouse, West Lights West Common				56°27′10″N 2°53′33″W	Category B	41950	Upload another image
1 Whitenhill 'The Auld Hoose Bar' And Adjoining House, 3 Whitenhill				56°26′52″N 2°52′43″W	Category C(S)	41925	Upload Photo
22, 24 Whitenhill And 69 Tay Street				56°26′53″N 2°52′43″W	Category C(S)	41930	Upload Photo
9 - 11 Inn Cottage (Formerly Old Scotscraig Inn) Manana And Ice House, Now Garage, 15 Inn Street				56°27′06″N 2°52′58″W	Category B	41946	Upload Photo
1 West Lights (L Cleall Harding) West Common				56°27′10″N 2°53′32″W	Category B	41951	Upload Photo
'The Cottage' 2 William Street				56°26′50″N 2°52′49″W	Category B	41955	Upload Photo
Inchcape, 20 Dougal Street				56°27′00″N 2°53′04″W	Category B	41957	Upload Photo
16 Whitenhill				56°26′53″N 2°52′45″W	Category C(S)	41927	Upload Photo
20 Whitenhill And 1 Butter Wynd				56°26′53″N 2°52′44″W	Category C(S)	41929	Upload Photo
2 Butter Wynd				56°26′53″N 2°52′44″W	Category C(S)	41931	Upload Photo
4 Butter Wynd				56°26′53″N 2°52′44″W	Category C(S)	41932	Upload Photo
90 Tay Street				56°26′53″N 2°52′42″W	Category C(S)	41933	Upload Photo
Tayport Cafe 38 William Street				56°26′54″N 2°52′53″W	Category B	41956	Upload Photo
St Mary Star The Sea Rc Church, Queen Street				56°26′39″N 2°52′57″W	Category B	41959	Upload Photo
Tayport Harbour				56°27′03″N 2°52′50″W	Category B	41960	Upload Photo
14 Whitenhill				56°26′53″N 2°52′45″W	Category C(S)	41926	Upload Photo
3, 7, 9 Rose Street				56°26′52″N 2°52′42″W	Category C(S)	41937	Upload Photo
8 Greenside Place				56°26′51″N 2°52′40″W	Category C(S)	41945	Upload Photo
3 Queen Street Wellfield Cottage				56°26′47″N 2°52′49″W	Category B	41958	Upload Photo
Queen Street, Tayport Primary School Including Railings And Boundary Walls				56°26′49″N 2°52′45″W	Category B	49917	Upload Photo
2 School Wynd				56°26′52″N 2°52′41″W	Category C(S)	41935	Upload Photo
6 Greenside Place (Formerly 4, 6 Greenside Place)				56°26′51″N 2°52′40″W	Category C(S)	41944	Upload Photo
Parish Kirk Churchyard Castle Street				56°26′50″N 2°52′44″W	Category C(S)	41924	Upload Photo
18 Whitenhill, Westwood House				56°26′53″N 2°52′44″W	Category C(S)	41928	Upload Photo
4 School Wynd 'Paradise Cottage'				56°26′52″N 2°52′41″W	Category C(S)	41936	Upload Photo
15 Rose Street				56°26′50″N 2°52′41″W	Category C(S)	41940	Upload Photo
2,2A Greenside Place				56°26′51″N 2°52′41″W	Category C(S)	41943	Upload Photo
Argyle House 23 Albert Street				56°27′06″N 2°53′06″W	Category C(S)	41949	Upload Photo
Tayside House 6 West Lights West Common				56°27′10″N 2°53′55″W	Category C(S)	41952	Upload Photo
Queen Street, St Margaret's Episcopal Church Including Boundary Walls				56°26′42″N 2°52′54″W	Category C(S)	46529	Upload Photo

== Key ==
The scheme for classifying buildings in Scotland is:

- Category A: "buildings of national or international importance, either architectural or historic; or fine, little-altered examples of some particular period, style or building type."
- Category B: "buildings of regional or more than local importance; or major examples of some particular period, style or building type, which may have been altered."
- Category C: "buildings of local importance; lesser examples of any period, style, or building type, as originally constructed or moderately altered; and simple traditional buildings which group well with other listed buildings."

In March 2016 there were 47,288 listed buildings in Scotland. Of these, 8% were Category A, and 50% were Category B, with the remaining 42% being Category C.

== See also ==
- List of listed buildings in Fife
