= List of listed buildings in Dunino, Fife =

This is a list of listed buildings in the parish of Dunino in Fife, Scotland.

== List ==
Name	Location	Date listed	Grid ref. (Note: Sometimes known as OSGB36, the grid reference (where provided) is based on the British national grid reference system used by the Ordnance Survey. • "Guide to National Grid". Ordnance Survey. • "Get-a-map". Ordnance Survey.)	Geo-coordinates	Notes	LB number (Note: Historic Environment Scotland assign a unique alphanumeric identifier to each designated site in Scotland, for listed buildings this always begins with "LB", for example "LB12345".)	Image
Dunino Bridge Over Wakefield Burn				56°17′28″N 2°45′01″W	Category C(S)	4313	Upload Photo
Stravithie House, Lodge And Gatepiers				56°17′30″N 2°45′03″W	Category C(S)	4319	Upload Photo
Stravithie House, Stables				56°17′26″N 2°45′23″W	Category B	4321	Upload Photo
Stravithie Mill				56°17′45″N 2°45′10″W	Category B	4322	Upload Photo
Stravithie Mill Cottages				56°17′44″N 2°45′12″W	Category C(S)	4323	Upload Photo
Dunino Churchyard, Sundial				56°17′18″N 2°44′36″W	Category C(S)	4315	Upload Photo
Dunino Manse				56°17′22″N 2°44′38″W	Category B	4316	Upload another image
Beley Bridge				56°16′55″N 2°44′34″W	Category C(S)	4312	Upload Photo
Stravithie House, Mill				56°17′25″N 2°45′22″W	Category C(S)	4320	Upload Photo
Dunino Church				56°17′19″N 2°44′35″W	Category B	49	Upload another image
Dunino Churchyard And Walls				56°17′19″N 2°44′36″W	Category B	4314	Upload Photo
Stravithie House				56°17′27″N 2°45′16″W	Category C(S)	4318	Upload another image

== Key ==
The scheme for classifying buildings in Scotland is:

- Category A: "buildings of national or international importance, either architectural or historic; or fine, little-altered examples of some particular period, style or building type."
- Category B: "buildings of regional or more than local importance; or major examples of some particular period, style or building type, which may have been altered."
- Category C: "buildings of local importance; lesser examples of any period, style, or building type, as originally constructed or moderately altered; and simple traditional buildings which group well with other listed buildings."

In March 2016 there were 47,288 listed buildings in Scotland. Of these, 8% were Category A, and 50% were Category B, with the remaining 42% being Category C.

== See also ==
- List of listed buildings in Fife
