= List of listed buildings in Ferry-Port-On-Craig, Fife =

This is a list of listed buildings in the parish of Ferry-Port-On-Craig in Fife, Scotland.

== List ==
Name	Location	Date listed	Grid ref. (Note: Sometimes known as OSGB36, the grid reference (where provided) is based on the British national grid reference system used by the Ordnance Survey. • "Guide to National Grid". Ordnance Survey. • "Get-a-map". Ordnance Survey.)	Geo-coordinates	Notes	LB number (Note: Historic Environment Scotland assign a unique alphanumeric identifier to each designated site in Scotland, for listed buildings this always begins with "LB", for example "LB12345".)	Image
Scotscraig, Farm Cottages At Old House				56°26′35″N 2°54′06″W	Category C(S)	9007	Upload Photo
Scotscraig, Doocot				56°26′36″N 2°54′02″W	Category B	13707	Upload Photo
Pile Lighthouse				56°27′11″N 2°52′21″W	Category B	9009	Upload another image
Garpit Cornmill				56°26′09″N 2°52′23″W	Category B	9022	Upload Photo
Shanwell Farmhouse				56°25′47″N 2°51′30″W	Category C(S)	9001	Upload Photo
Scotscraig - Farm Building (Sawmill In 1969)				56°26′35″N 2°54′03″W	Category C(S)	9006	Upload Photo

== Key ==
The scheme for classifying buildings in Scotland is:

- Category A: "buildings of national or international importance, either architectural or historic; or fine, little-altered examples of some particular period, style or building type."
- Category B: "buildings of regional or more than local importance; or major examples of some particular period, style or building type, which may have been altered."
- Category C: "buildings of local importance; lesser examples of any period, style, or building type, as originally constructed or moderately altered; and simple traditional buildings which group well with other listed buildings."

In March 2016 there were 47,288 listed buildings in Scotland. Of these, 8% were Category A, and 50% were Category B, with the remaining 42% being Category C.

== See also ==
- List of listed buildings in Fife
