= List of listed buildings in Auchterderran, Fife =

This is a list of listed buildings in the parish of Auchterderran in Fife, Scotland.

== List ==
Name	Location	Date listed	Grid ref. (Note: Sometimes known as OSGB36, the grid reference (where provided) is based on the British national grid reference system used by the Ordnance Survey. • "Guide to National Grid". Ordnance Survey. • "Get-a-map". Ordnance Survey.)	Geo-coordinates	Notes	LB number (Note: Historic Environment Scotland assign a unique alphanumeric identifier to each designated site in Scotland, for listed buildings this always begins with "LB", for example "LB12345".)	Image
Pitcairn Steading And Farmhouse With Boundary Walls				56°08′54″N 3°17′31″W	Category B	43661	Upload Photo
Auchterderran War Memorial With Gatepiers, Boundary Wall And Railings				56°08′58″N 3°16′03″W	Category C(S)	43651	Upload Photo
Cardenden, Railway Viaduct				56°08′30″N 3°15′31″W	Category B	43656	Upload another image
Balgreggie With Outbuildings, Boundary Wall And Gates				56°09′19″N 3°15′12″W	Category C(S)	43657	Upload Photo
Cardenden, School Lane, Denend Primary School				56°08′32″N 3°15′43″W	Category B	43655	Upload Photo
Auchterderran, Woodend Road, Auchterderran Staff Development And Resources Centre With Outbuildings And Boundary Walls				56°09′04″N 3°16′02″W	Category C(S)	43650	Upload Photo
Bowhill, 133 Station Road, Bowhill Public House, Society, No 1 Gothenburg				56°08′46″N 3°15′44″W	Category C(S)	43654	Upload Photo
Auchterderran, Woodend Road, Auchterderran Parish Church Crypt And Graveyard				56°09′02″N 3°15′58″W	Category B	3675	Upload Photo
Auchterderran, 12 Woodend Road With Boundary Walls				56°09′02″N 3°16′00″W	Category C(S)	43649	Upload Photo
Bowhill, Main Street, Old Miners' Institute				56°08′52″N 3°15′51″W	Category C(S)	43653	Upload Photo
Harestanes Steading And Farmhouse With Boundary Walls				56°09′34″N 3°15′33″W	Category B	43659	Upload Photo
Little Raith				56°06′40″N 3°16′39″W	Category B	43660	Upload Photo
Dothan Farmhouse With Gatepiers And Boundary Walls				56°08′28″N 3°12′39″W	Category C(S)	43658	Upload Photo
Auchterderran, Woodend Road, Auchterderran Parish Church With Boundary Walls, Gates And Gatepiers				56°09′01″N 3°15′59″W	Category B	3674	Upload another image
Bowhill, 22 Main Street, Cemetery Lodge With Gatepiers, Gates, Boundary Walls And Railings				56°08′54″N 3°15′53″W	Category B	43652	Upload Photo

== Key ==
The scheme for classifying buildings in Scotland is:

- Category A: "buildings of national or international importance, either architectural or historic; or fine, little-altered examples of some particular period, style or building type."
- Category B: "buildings of regional or more than local importance; or major examples of some particular period, style or building type, which may have been altered."
- Category C: "buildings of local importance; lesser examples of any period, style, or building type, as originally constructed or moderately altered; and simple traditional buildings which group well with other listed buildings."

In March 2016 there were 47,288 listed buildings in Scotland. Of these, 8% were Category A, and 50% were Category B, with the remaining 42% being Category C.

== See also ==
- List of listed buildings in Fife
