= List of listed buildings in Anstruther Wester, Fife =

This is a list of listed buildings in the parish of Anstruther Wester in Fife, Scotland.

== List ==
Name	Location	Date listed	Grid ref. (Note: Sometimes known as OSGB36, the grid reference (where provided) is based on the British national grid reference system used by the Ordnance Survey. • "Guide to National Grid". Ordnance Survey. • "Get-a-map". Ordnance Survey.)	Geo-coordinates	Notes	LB number (Note: Historic Environment Scotland assign a unique alphanumeric identifier to each designated site in Scotland, for listed buildings this always begins with "LB", for example "LB12345".)	Image
Grangemuir House				56°13′37″N 2°44′40″W	Category B	2709	Upload another image
Isle of May High Lighthouse (Stevenson Lighthouse)	Isle of May			56°11′08″N 2°33′27″W	Category B	2712	Upload another image See more images
Easter Grangemuir Farmhouse				56°13′38″N 2°43′53″W	Category C(S)	2707	Upload Photo
Isle Of May South Horn	Isle of May			56°10′51″N 2°33′00″W	Category C(S)	2689	Upload another image
Grangemuir Bridge (Over Dreel Burn)				56°13′15″N 2°44′19″W	Category B	2708	Upload Photo
Grangemuir House East Lodge				56°13′35″N 2°44′25″W	Category C(S)	2710	Upload Photo
Grangemuir House Former Stables And Steading				56°13′38″N 2°44′48″W	Category B	2711	Upload Photo
Isle Of May Low Light And Cottages	Isle of May			56°11′16″N 2°33′27″W	Category C(S)	2687	Upload another image See more images
Isle Of May North Horn	Isle of May			56°11′27″N 2°33′51″W	Category C(S)	2688	Upload another image
Isle Of May Fluke Street Former Coal Store And Stable Block	Isle of May			56°11′02″N 2°33′16″W	Category B	2713	Upload Photo

== Key ==
The scheme for classifying buildings in Scotland is:

- Category A: "buildings of national or international importance, either architectural or historic; or fine, little-altered examples of some particular period, style or building type."
- Category B: "buildings of regional or more than local importance; or major examples of some particular period, style or building type, which may have been altered."
- Category C: "buildings of local importance; lesser examples of any period, style, or building type, as originally constructed or moderately altered; and simple traditional buildings which group well with other listed buildings."

In March 2016 there were 47,288 listed buildings in Scotland. Of these, 8% were Category A, and 50% were Category B, with the remaining 42% being Category C.

== See also ==
- List of listed buildings in Fife
