= List of listed buildings in Lochgelly, Fife =

This is a list of listed buildings in the parish of Lochgelly in Fife, Scotland.

== List ==
Name	Location	Date listed	Grid ref. (Note: Sometimes known as OSGB36, the grid reference (where provided) is based on the British national grid reference system used by the Ordnance Survey. • "Guide to National Grid". Ordnance Survey. • "Get-a-map". Ordnance Survey.)	Geo-coordinates	Notes	LB number (Note: Historic Environment Scotland assign a unique alphanumeric identifier to each designated site in Scotland, for listed buildings this always begins with "LB", for example "LB12345".)	Image
Lochgelly, Main Street, St Serf's Parish Church (Church Of Scotland; Formerly Macainsh Parish Church), Including Hall, Manse (82 Main Street), Gates, Gatepiers, Boundary Walls And Railings				56°07′31″N 3°18′39″W	Category C(S)	47755	Upload Photo
Lochgelly, Hall Street, Town House				56°07′38″N 3°18′29″W	Category B	37512	Upload Photo
125-127 (Odd Nos) Main Street, Former Miners' Welfare And War Memorial Institute				56°07′34″N 3°18′36″W	Category B	37513	Upload Photo
Lochgelly, Bank Street, Chapel Street Co-Op				56°07′41″N 3°18′33″W	Category B	37511	Upload Photo

== Key ==
The scheme for classifying buildings in Scotland is:

- Category A: "buildings of national or international importance, either architectural or historic; or fine, little-altered examples of some particular period, style or building type."
- Category B: "buildings of regional or more than local importance; or major examples of some particular period, style or building type, which may have been altered."
- Category C: "buildings of local importance; lesser examples of any period, style, or building type, as originally constructed or moderately altered; and simple traditional buildings which group well with other listed buildings."

In March 2016 there were 47,288 listed buildings in Scotland. Of these, 8% were Category A, and 50% were Category B, with the remaining 42% being Category C.

== See also ==
- List of listed buildings in Fife
