= List of listed buildings in Monimail, Fife =

This is a list of listed buildings in the parish of Monimail in Fife, Scotland.

== List ==
Name	Location	Date listed	Grid ref. (Note: Sometimes known as OSGB36, the grid reference (where provided) is based on the British national grid reference system used by the Ordnance Survey. • "Guide to National Grid". Ordnance Survey. • "Get-a-map". Ordnance Survey.)	Geo-coordinates	Notes	LB number (Note: Historic Environment Scotland assign a unique alphanumeric identifier to each designated site in Scotland, for listed buildings this always begins with "LB", for example "LB12345".)	Image
Letham 1-5 (Odd Nos) School Brae				56°19′03″N 3°07′18″W	Category C(S)	19230	Upload Photo
Rankeilour Bridge Over Rankeilour Burn				56°17′40″N 3°05′16″W	Category C(S)	19134	Upload Photo
Mount Hill, Hopetoun Monument (To Sir John Hope Of Over Rankeilour)				56°20′10″N 3°05′01″W	Category B	17428	Upload another image
Lindifferon Farmhouse, Gatepiers And Steading				56°20′05″N 3°06′30″W	Category B	15447	Upload Photo
Melville House North Lodge And Gatepiers				56°18′52″N 3°08′03″W	Category B	15450	Upload Photo
Fernie Castle Ice House				56°19′15″N 3°06′26″W	Category C(S)	15475	Upload Photo
Letham Village Letham Lands Farmhouse Steading And Former Horsemill				56°19′03″N 3°07′15″W	Category B	15478	Upload Photo
Monimail Village The Old Mill				56°18′57″N 3°08′19″W	Category B	15483	Upload Photo
Monimail Quarry Monument At The Ladies' Seat				56°19′07″N 3°08′19″W	Category C(S)	15484	Upload Photo
Nisbetfield Farmhouse And Steading				56°19′01″N 3°07′51″W	Category B	15485	Upload Photo
Over Rankeilour Home Farm And Gatepiers				56°18′18″N 3°05′15″W	Category B	15489	Upload Photo
Rankeilour Mains Farmhouse, Steading, Cartshed And Cottage				56°17′43″N 3°05′14″W	Category B	15490	Upload Photo
Monimail Parish Church				56°18′53″N 3°07′47″W	Category B	15497	Upload another image See more images
Letham Village West End St Margaret's St Cuthbert's (Formerly Helenslea) Ballacraine Cluny				56°19′01″N 3°07′18″W	Category C(S)	15443	Upload Photo
Letham Village West End The Brae				56°18′59″N 3°07′25″W	Category C(S)	15446	Upload Photo
Melville House Pavilion Blocks And Lodges				56°18′41″N 3°08′05″W	Category A	15448	Upload another image
Bow Of Fife Pitlessie Road Manse				56°18′10″N 3°05′59″W	Category C(S)	15467	Upload Photo
Over Rankeilour House, Octagonal Enclosure, And Garage And Gatepiers				56°18′36″N 3°05′13″W	Category A	15486	Upload Photo
Letham Village, Mr Cameron (West Of And Adjoining Letham Lands)				56°19′03″N 3°07′16″W	Category B	17426	Upload Photo
Letham Village West End, Melville Place Upper Melville Place Cargill House And West View				56°19′00″N 3°07′23″W	Category C(S)	15445	Upload Photo
Melville House Monument To West Of Walled Garden				56°18′52″N 3°08′16″W	Category B	15449	Upload Photo
Ballantager Farm-House And Steading				56°18′40″N 3°07′09″W	Category B	15464	Upload Photo
Cunnoquhie House				56°19′28″N 3°06′44″W	Category A	15469	Upload Photo
Fernie Castle Bridge At Main Drive				56°19′10″N 3°06′34″W	Category C(S)	15474	Upload Photo
Letham Village Schoolhouse				56°19′09″N 3°07′22″W	Category B	15482	Upload Photo
Cunnoquhie Former Stable Block				56°19′28″N 3°06′48″W	Category A	19749	Upload Photo
Monimail Cemetery Walls And Gatepiers, And Fragments Of Old Church And North Aisle				56°18′53″N 3°08′09″W	Category B	19133	Upload Photo
Letham Village, Dovecote To North Of School Brae				56°19′08″N 3°07′26″W	Category B	17427	Upload Photo
Bow Of Fife Church				56°18′12″N 3°06′01″W	Category C(S)	15466	Upload another image
Cunnoquhie Garden Walls And Gardener's Cottage				56°19′24″N 3°06′48″W	Category C(S)	15471	Upload Photo
Fernie Castle Garden Walls				56°19′14″N 3°06′09″W	Category C(S)	15473	Upload Photo
Rankeilour, East Lodge And Gatepiers				56°18′00″N 3°04′24″W	Category B	15491	Upload Photo
Fernie Castle Stable Blocks And Kennels				56°19′17″N 3°06′11″W	Category B	15476	Upload Photo
Letham Village School Brae Dovecot				56°19′06″N 3°07′21″W	Category B	15481	Upload Photo
St Mary's Farmhouse And Steading				56°19′23″N 3°03′30″W	Category B	15492	Upload Photo
Monimail Tower Or Palace (Also Known As Cardinal Beaton's Tower) And Melville House Garden Walls				56°18′50″N 3°08′09″W	Category A	15498	Upload another image See more images
Rankeilour Dovecote				56°17′43″N 3°05′05″W	Category B	19135	Upload Photo
Barham House				56°18′06″N 3°06′20″W	Category B	15465	Upload Photo
Fernie Castle Hotel				56°19′14″N 3°06′26″W	Category B	15472	Upload Photo
Over Rankeilour House Former Stables And Cottage To North				56°18′32″N 3°05′23″W	Category C(S)	15487	Upload Photo
Over Rankeilour House Garden Walls				56°18′34″N 3°05′37″W	Category C(S)	15488	Upload Photo
Pathcondie Farmhouse				56°19′00″N 3°08′39″W	Category B	19750	Upload Photo
Carslogie Dovecot				56°19′02″N 3°03′10″W	Category C(S)	15468	Upload Photo
Cunnoquhie Lodge And Gatepiers				56°19′21″N 3°06′24″W	Category B	15470	Upload Photo
Letham Village Letham Lands Former Bakehouse				56°19′03″N 3°07′16″W	Category C(S)	15479	Upload Photo
Letham Village West End Balyarrow				56°19′00″N 3°07′21″W	Category C(S)	15444	Upload Photo
Letham Village Balmerino Cottage And Garden Walls				56°19′06″N 3°07′24″W	Category B	15477	Upload Photo
Letham Village Letham Lands Dovecot				56°19′03″N 3°07′16″W	Category B	15480	Upload Photo

== Key ==
The scheme for classifying buildings in Scotland is:

- Category A: "buildings of national or international importance, either architectural or historic; or fine, little-altered examples of some particular period, style or building type."
- Category B: "buildings of regional or more than local importance; or major examples of some particular period, style or building type, which may have been altered."
- Category C: "buildings of local importance; lesser examples of any period, style, or building type, as originally constructed or moderately altered; and simple traditional buildings which group well with other listed buildings."

In March 2016 there were 47,288 listed buildings in Scotland. Of these, 8% were Category A, and 50% were Category B, with the remaining 42% being Category C.

== See also ==
- List of listed buildings in Fife
