= List of listed buildings in Kinglassie, Fife =

This is a list of listed buildings in the parish of Kinglassie in Fife, Scotland.

== List ==
Name	Location	Date listed	Grid ref. (Note: Sometimes known as OSGB36, the grid reference (where provided) is based on the British national grid reference system used by the Ordnance Survey. • "Guide to National Grid". Ordnance Survey. • "Get-a-map". Ordnance Survey.)	Geo-coordinates	Notes	LB number (Note: Historic Environment Scotland assign a unique alphanumeric identifier to each designated site in Scotland, for listed buildings this always begins with "LB", for example "LB12345".)	Image
Inchdairnie Lodge With Boundary Walls				56°10′49″N 3°12′45″W	Category C(S)	43665	Upload Photo
Kinglassie, Main Street, Mitchell Hall With Caretaker's House And Boundary Walls				56°10′26″N 3°14′34″W	Category B	43668	Upload Photo
Kinglassie, 2 Redwells Road With Boundary Walls And Gates				56°10′26″N 3°14′45″W	Category C(S)	43671	Upload Photo
Kinglassie House With Walled Garden, Boundary Walls, Gatepiers And Gate				56°09′42″N 3°14′01″W	Category B	43672	Upload Photo
Glenrothes, Church Street, St Columba's Parish Church Including Hall And Bell Tower				56°11′43″N 3°10′44″W	Category A	49999	Upload Photo
Kinglassie, Main Street, Former Free Church With Boundary Walls				56°10′29″N 3°14′27″W	Category C(S)	43666	Upload Photo
Kinglassie, Main Street, Miners Welfare Institute With Boundary Walls				56°10′31″N 3°14′22″W	Category C(S)	43667	Upload Photo
Kinglassie, Church Lane, Kinglassie Parish Church Gateway, Graveyard And Boundary Walls				56°10′23″N 3°14′43″W	Category B	13005	Upload Photo
Kinglassie, Main Street, War Memorial				56°10′26″N 3°14′33″W	Category C(S)	43670	Upload Photo
Craigend With Boundary Walls, Gatepiers And Gates				56°10′59″N 3°17′18″W	Category B	43663	Upload Photo
Bankhead House With Outbuilding, Boundary Walls, Gatepiers And Gates				56°10′44″N 3°13′30″W	Category C(S)	43662	Upload Photo
Strathore Road, Strathore Lodge Hotel With Gatepiers, Boundary Walls And Railings				56°09′41″N 3°11′38″W	Category C(S)	43673	Upload Photo
Auchmuir Bridge				56°11′46″N 3°15′39″W	Category B	13007	Upload another image
Blythe's Tower				56°10′56″N 3°14′48″W	Category B	13006	Upload another image
Cabbagehall Railway Viaduct				56°11′53″N 3°12′49″W	Category B	13008	Upload another image
Craigend Steading				56°10′59″N 3°17′15″W	Category B	43664	Upload Photo
Kinglassie, Main Street, Public Library And Health Centre With Boundary Walls				56°10′26″N 3°14′31″W	Category C(S)	43669	Upload Photo
Glenwood Road, Glenwood House With Outbuildings, Boundary Walls Gatepiers And Gates				56°11′46″N 3°12′47″W	Category B	13627	Upload Photo
Kinglassie, Church Lane, Kinglassie Parish Church				56°10′23″N 3°14′43″W	Category B	13004	Upload Photo
Kinglassie, Main Street, Kinglassie Primary School With Boundary Walls, Gatepiers, Gates And Railings				56°10′32″N 3°14′14″W	Category B	12960	Upload Photo
Beaufort Drive, Henge				56°11′07″N 3°09′35″W	Category C(S)	51792	Upload Photo

== Key ==
The scheme for classifying buildings in Scotland is:

- Category A: "buildings of national or international importance, either architectural or historic; or fine, little-altered examples of some particular period, style or building type."
- Category B: "buildings of regional or more than local importance; or major examples of some particular period, style or building type, which may have been altered."
- Category C: "buildings of local importance; lesser examples of any period, style, or building type, as originally constructed or moderately altered; and simple traditional buildings which group well with other listed buildings."

In March 2016 there were 47,288 listed buildings in Scotland. Of these, 8% were Category A, and 50% were Category B, with the remaining 42% being Category C.

== See also ==
- List of listed buildings in Fife
