= List of listed buildings in Ladybank, Fife =

This is a list of listed buildings in the parish of Ladybank in Fife, Scotland.

== List ==
Name	Location	Date listed	Grid ref. (Note: Sometimes known as OSGB36, the grid reference (where provided) is based on the British national grid reference system used by the Ordnance Survey. • "Guide to National Grid". Ordnance Survey. • "Get-a-map". Ordnance Survey.)	Geo-coordinates	Notes	LB number (Note: Historic Environment Scotland assign a unique alphanumeric identifier to each designated site in Scotland, for listed buildings this always begins with "LB", for example "LB12345".)	Image
Church Street Parish Church Manse				56°16′43″N 3°07′43″W	Category C(S)	36921	Upload Photo
Church Lane, Former Manse				56°16′38″N 3°07′32″W	Category C(S)	36919	Upload Photo
Ladybank Station (Main West Block)				56°16′27″N 3°07′18″W	Category A	36925	Upload Photo
Church Street No 48				56°16′37″N 3°07′43″W	Category C(S)	36922	Upload Photo
Victoria Road Miss Allan				56°16′39″N 3°07′23″W	Category C(S)	36926	Upload Photo
Beeches Road Ladybank Pumping Station				56°16′49″N 3°07′31″W	Category B	36918	Upload another image
Church Street Ladybank Church (C Of S)				56°16′45″N 3°07′43″W	Category B	36920	Upload Photo
Commercial Road Nos 1 & 3				56°16′27″N 3°07′23″W	Category C(S)	36923	Upload Photo

== Key ==
The scheme for classifying buildings in Scotland is:

- Category A: "buildings of national or international importance, either architectural or historic; or fine, little-altered examples of some particular period, style or building type."
- Category B: "buildings of regional or more than local importance; or major examples of some particular period, style or building type, which may have been altered."
- Category C: "buildings of local importance; lesser examples of any period, style, or building type, as originally constructed or moderately altered; and simple traditional buildings which group well with other listed buildings."

In March 2016 there were 47,288 listed buildings in Scotland. Of these, 8% were Category A, and 50% were Category B, with the remaining 42% being Category C.

== See also ==
- List of listed buildings in Fife
