= List of listed buildings in Ballingry, Fife =

This is a list of listed buildings in the parish of Ballingry in Fife, Scotland.

== List ==
Name	Location	Date listed	Grid ref. (Note: Sometimes known as OSGB36, the grid reference (where provided) is based on the British national grid reference system used by the Ordnance Survey. • "Guide to National Grid". Ordnance Survey. • "Get-a-map". Ordnance Survey.)	Geo-coordinates	Notes	LB number (Note: Historic Environment Scotland assign a unique alphanumeric identifier to each designated site in Scotland, for listed buildings this always begins with "LB", for example "LB12345".)	Image
Blair Mill (Eastern Mill Range Only)				56°09′03″N 3°21′55″W	Category B	3301	Upload Photo
Benarty, Hill Road, St Serf's Parish Church (Formerly Ballingry Kirk)				56°09′51″N 3°19′50″W	Category B	3318	Upload another image
Ballingry House				56°10′01″N 3°20′16″W	Category C(S)	1886	Upload Photo
Benarty House				56°09′13″N 3°21′30″W	Category A	3321	Upload Photo
Lumphinnans, Main Street, War Memorial Including Railings				56°07′12″N 3°19′50″W	Category C(S)	49890	Upload Photo
Benarty Steading				56°09′16″N 3°21′33″W	Category A	3322	Upload Photo
Wester Cartmore Farmhouse				56°07′57″N 3°19′34″W	Category C(S)	43732	Upload Photo
Wester Cartmore, Doocot				56°07′55″N 3°19′33″W	Category B	43733	Upload Photo

== Key ==
The scheme for classifying buildings in Scotland is:

- Category A: "buildings of national or international importance, either architectural or historic; or fine, little-altered examples of some particular period, style or building type."
- Category B: "buildings of regional or more than local importance; or major examples of some particular period, style or building type, which may have been altered."
- Category C: "buildings of local importance; lesser examples of any period, style, or building type, as originally constructed or moderately altered; and simple traditional buildings which group well with other listed buildings."

In March 2016 there were 47,288 listed buildings in Scotland. Of these, 8% were Category A, and 50% were Category B, with the remaining 42% being Category C.

== See also ==
- List of listed buildings in Fife
