= List of listed buildings in Kettle, Fife =

This is a list of listed buildings in the parish of Kettle in Fife, Scotland.

== List ==
Name	Location	Date listed	Grid ref. (Note: Sometimes known as OSGB36, the grid reference (where provided) is based on the British national grid reference system used by the Ordnance Survey. • "Guide to National Grid". Ordnance Survey. • "Get-a-map". Ordnance Survey.)	Geo-coordinates	Notes	LB number (Note: Historic Environment Scotland assign a unique alphanumeric identifier to each designated site in Scotland, for listed buildings this always begins with "LB", for example "LB12345".)	Image
Riggs Farmhouse And Cottage To East				56°15′24″N 3°08′55″W	Category B	13711	Upload Photo
Kingskettle 6, 7 Crown Square				56°15′42″N 3°06′59″W	Category C(S)	9038	Upload Photo
Ramornie Roadbridge Over River Eden				56°16′30″N 3°05′05″W	Category C(S)	9047	Upload Photo
Kingskettle 52 Rumdewan				56°15′29″N 3°07′14″W	Category C(S)	9048	Upload Photo
Kingskettle Main Street Canmore				56°15′46″N 3°06′59″W	Category C(S)	9026	Upload Photo
Kingskettle Main Street School And Schoolhouse				56°15′45″N 3°06′56″W	Category C(S)	9029	Upload Photo
Kingskettle, Main Street And South Street, Kettle Parish Church, Church Hall And Boundary Walls				56°15′44″N 3°06′55″W	Category B	9031	Upload another image
Balmalcolm Village Orchard House				56°15′45″N 3°06′03″W	Category B	9032	Upload Photo
Kettlebridge Cupar Road The Blue House				56°15′14″N 3°07′14″W	Category C(S)	9036	Upload Photo
Ramornie Policies Bridge Over Eden				56°16′12″N 3°05′52″W	Category B	9045	Upload Photo
Kingskettle Main Street Inchyra And Sunnyside				56°15′45″N 3°06′59″W	Category B	9030	Upload Photo
Orkie Miln Steading				56°15′33″N 3°07′51″W	Category B	13710	Upload Photo
Kingskettle Crown Square Crown Hotel Building				56°15′42″N 3°07′01″W	Category C(S)	9040	Upload Photo
Lathrisk Policies Burnside (Formerly Lathrisk House Laundry)				56°15′45″N 3°10′40″W	Category B	9043	Upload Photo
Lathrisk Home Farm House, Flanking Steading Wings Garden Walls And Gatepiers To South				56°15′42″N 3°10′25″W	Category B	9044	Upload Photo
Ramornie Policies Garden Walls And Garden Shed				56°16′28″N 3°05′49″W	Category C(S)	9046	Upload Photo
Kingskettle Ladybank Road Norwich And Glenely				56°15′50″N 3°06′59″W	Category C(S)	9023	Upload Photo
Kingskettle Main Street Kerr Cottage				56°15′46″N 3°06′58″W	Category C(S)	13709	Upload Photo
Kingskettle 26 Station Road Ash Villa				56°15′44″N 3°07′09″W	Category C(S)	9041	Upload Photo
Kingskettle Ladybank Road Rowanlea House And Gatepiers				56°15′50″N 3°07′01″W	Category C(S)	9024	Upload Photo
Kingskettle 8 Crown Square Cameron House				56°15′42″N 3°06′59″W	Category C(S)	9039	Upload Photo
Kingskettle 14 Main Street				56°15′46″N 3°06′57″W	Category C(S)	9027	Upload Photo
Kingskettle 32 Main Street Wayside				56°15′42″N 3°07′02″W	Category C(S)	9028	Upload Photo
Balmalcolm Village Rose Cottage And Cottage Adjoining To East				56°15′43″N 3°06′04″W	Category B	9033	Upload Photo
Edenbank Road-Bridge (A914) Over River Eden				56°15′51″N 3°08′33″W	Category C(S)	9035	Upload Photo
Kingskettle, Old Cemetery Enclosure				56°15′44″N 3°06′51″W	Category C(S)	13010	Upload Photo
Shiells/Lathrisk Roadbridge Over River Eden				56°15′51″N 3°09′29″W	Category C(S)	10810	Upload another image
Lathrisk House And Gatepiers				56°15′47″N 3°10′30″W	Category A	9042	Upload Photo
Kingskettle, Bankton Park, Station Inn				56°15′43″N 3°07′11″W	Category C(S)	13009	Upload Photo
Kettlebridge 50 North St Haughfield House				56°15′22″N 3°07′09″W	Category B	9037	Upload Photo
Kettlebridge Ladybank Road Low Farm Horsemill Range Only				56°15′51″N 3°07′03″W	Category C(S)	9025	Upload Photo
Balmalcolm Village White Croft (Formerly Balmalcolm Cottage)				56°15′41″N 3°06′14″W	Category B	9034	Upload Photo

== Key ==
The scheme for classifying buildings in Scotland is:

- Category A: "buildings of national or international importance, either architectural or historic; or fine, little-altered examples of some particular period, style or building type."
- Category B: "buildings of regional or more than local importance; or major examples of some particular period, style or building type, which may have been altered."
- Category C: "buildings of local importance; lesser examples of any period, style, or building type, as originally constructed or moderately altered; and simple traditional buildings which group well with other listed buildings."

In March 2016 there were 47,288 listed buildings in Scotland. Of these, 8% were Category A, and 50% were Category B, with the remaining 42% being Category C.

== See also ==
- List of listed buildings in Fife
