= List of listed buildings in Ceres, Fife =

This is a list of listed buildings in the parish of Ceres in Fife, Scotland.

== List ==
Name	Location	Date listed	Grid ref. (Note: Sometimes known as OSGB36, the grid reference (where provided) is based on the British national grid reference system used by the Ordnance Survey. • "Guide to National Grid". Ordnance Survey. • "Get-a-map". Ordnance Survey.)	Geo-coordinates	Notes	LB number (Note: Historic Environment Scotland assign a unique alphanumeric identifier to each designated site in Scotland, for listed buildings this always begins with "LB", for example "LB12345".)	Image
Bridge Over Ceres Burn, South Of Pitscottie				56°18′05″N 2°56′46″W	Category B	6501	Upload another image
Ceres, Saughtree, Main Street, House, Store And Garages				56°17′40″N 2°58′34″W	Category C(S)	4286	Upload Photo
High Street, House And Shop ( James Walker)				56°17′32″N 2°58′14″W	Category C(S)	4292	Upload Photo
High Street, Kirphon				56°17′32″N 2°58′14″W	Category C(S)	4294	Upload Photo
Teassesmill Bridge				56°17′08″N 2°58′19″W	Category B	2424	Upload Photo
Dairy, Castlegate, Ceres				56°17′30″N 2°58′12″W	Category C(S)	2371	Upload Photo
Castlegate Farmhouse Castlegate, Ceres				56°17′30″N 2°58′12″W	Category C(S)	2372	Upload Photo
15 Main Street, Plumtree Cottage				56°17′34″N 2°58′15″W	Category B	2383	Upload Photo
Cottage At East Gate, Baltilly, Formerly Occupied By James Archibald				56°17′36″N 2°58′29″W	Category C(S)	2386	Upload Photo
Southern Outbuilding Of Brand's Hotel, High Street, Ceres				56°17′31″N 2°58′14″W	Category A	2393	Upload another image
Castle House, Anstruther Road, Ceres				56°17′32″N 2°58′04″W	Category C(S)	2397	Upload Photo
Cummerfield Cottage, Anstruther Road, Ceres				56°17′32″N 2°58′04″W	Category C(S)	2398	Upload Photo
Ceres, Kirklands, 43 Main Street				56°17′39″N 2°58′24″W	Category C(S)	4285	Upload Photo
Bridgend, Dam Bridge				56°17′41″N 2°58′35″W	Category B	4295	Upload Photo
Bridgend, Gatepiers To Eastmost House On S Side Of New Town, West Of Bridge				56°17′41″N 2°58′37″W	Category C(S)	4296	Upload Photo
Craigrothie, Footbridge				56°17′21″N 3°00′01″W	Category B	2419	Upload another image
Kilhill Bridge Over Ceres Burn				56°17′57″N 2°57′35″W	Category C(S)	2427	Upload Photo
Loch Houses				56°17′29″N 2°58′25″W	Category C(S)	2442	Upload Photo
Baltilly, House And Walled Garden With Sundial				56°17′35″N 2°58′32″W	Category B	2384	Upload Photo
Viewfield Cottage St Andrew's Road Including Garden Walls And Gatepiers				56°17′37″N 2°58′02″W	Category B	2391	Upload Photo
Fife Folk Museum (Central And North Fife Preservation Society) High Street, Ceres				56°17′31″N 2°58′14″W		2394	Upload another image
Old Manse, Anstruther Road, Ceres				56°17′29″N 2°58′01″W	Category B	2403	Upload Photo
Smithy Cottage And Smith, Schoolhill, Junction With Anstruther Road				56°17′33″N 2°58′04″W	Category C(S)	2405	Upload Photo
Restalrig And Marlowes, Schoolhill, Ceres				56°17′33″N 2°58′02″W	Category C(S)	2407	Upload Photo
Craighall Den, Ceres, Limekiln				56°17′03″N 2°57′25″W	Category B	51767	Upload Photo
Greenside Farm Steading				56°15′17″N 2°58′52″W	Category A	4302	Upload another image
Teasses Estate, Walled Garden				56°15′42″N 2°57′11″W	Category C(S)	3436	Upload Photo
Teasses House, Gatelodge				56°15′35″N 2°57′56″W	Category B	3437	Upload Photo
Bow Butts Bridge - Bannockburn Monument				56°17′31″N 2°58′17″W	Category C(S)	2409	Upload Photo
House (Jasmine S Mair) South Croftdyke, Ceres				56°17′29″N 2°58′19″W	Category C(S)	2412	Upload Photo
Bridge Over Ceres Burn, On B939, West Side Pitscottie				56°18′20″N 2°56′47″W	Category C(S)	2428	Upload Photo
Wood End Cottage, North Croftdyke, Ceres				56°17′33″N 2°58′23″W	Category C(S)	2441	Upload Photo
Edenwood Home Farm (Front Nw Part Only)				56°17′40″N 3°02′10″W	Category B	2444	Upload Photo
Crawford Priory East Gate Gate Piers On A92 Near Clushford Toll				56°17′28″N 3°02′33″W	Category C(S)	2446	Upload Photo
Kirk Brae Lindsay Vault, Parish Churchyard (Formerly Main Street), Ceres				56°17′37″N 2°58′18″W	Category B	2365	Upload another image
St John's Masonic Lodge Off High Street, Ceres, Including Garden Walls				56°17′29″N 2°58′13″W	Category A	2368	Upload another image
Kimberley (Former Parish School) 33 Main Street, Ceres Including Garden Walls				56°17′37″N 2°58′21″W	Category B	2380	Upload Photo
1 Main Street, The Cross, Corner St Andrew's Road (Mrs Cunningham)				56°17′33″N 2°58′13″W	Category C(S)	2382	Upload Photo
Cottage (A Macdonald), Baltilly				56°17′36″N 2°58′28″W	Category C(S)	2387	Upload Photo
Castle Bank, Anstruther Road, Ceres				56°17′32″N 2°58′04″W	Category C(S)	2396	Upload Photo
High Street, Burnview				56°17′32″N 2°58′14″W	Category B	4293	Upload Photo
Craigrothie House, Icehouse And Screen Wall Linked To House				56°17′18″N 3°00′02″W	Category B	4300	Upload Photo
House (John Webster, Southern House), South Croftdyke, Ceres				56°17′29″N 2°58′18″W	Category C(S)	2414	Upload Photo
Wellwood, Well				56°17′54″N 2°57′40″W	Category B	2425	Upload Photo
Gathercauld Bridge Over Craighall Burn				56°16′29″N 2°56′06″W	Category C(S)	2429	Upload Photo
Teasses House				56°15′42″N 2°57′30″W	Category B	2430	Upload Photo
Kirk Brae Ceres Parish Churchyard (Formerly Main Street), Ceres				56°17′37″N 2°58′16″W	Category C(S)	2364	Upload Photo
Bishop Bridge Over Ceres Burn, Including Approach Walls Linking To Folk Museum, Ceres				56°17′29″N 2°58′14″W	Category A	2366	Upload another image See more images
1 Kirk Brae Parish Church Hall (Formerly 31 Main Street), Ceres				56°17′36″N 2°58′17″W	Category B	2379	Upload Photo
Brand's Hotel, High Street, Ceres Including North-West Wing				56°17′31″N 2°58′15″W	Category B	2392	Upload Photo
War Memorial Hall, Anstruther Road, Ceres				56°17′30″N 2°58′02″W	Category B	2402	Upload Photo
Main Street, Premises Formerly P Butt And Sons, Ceres				56°17′37″N 2°58′22″W	Category C(S)	4287	Upload Photo
56 Main Street, Meldrum's Hotel				56°17′37″N 2°58′25″W	Category C(S)	4289	Upload Photo
Teasses Estate, Steading				56°15′43″N 2°57′27″W	Category B	3435	Upload Photo
House (David Kidd) South Croftdyke Ceres				56°17′30″N 2°58′19″W	Category C(S)	2411	Upload Photo
Hill Of Tarvit Dovecot				56°17′30″N 3°00′23″W	Category B	2418	Upload another image
Mile Plate On A92 Near Tarvit Mill				56°18′02″N 3°01′41″W	Category B	2445	Upload Photo
Dunroamin, Bishop Bridge Off High Street, Ceres				56°17′30″N 2°58′13″W	Category C(S)	2367	Upload Photo
Wilbra Cottage, South Croftdyke, Ceres				56°17′28″N 2°58′19″W	Category C(S)	2375	Upload Photo
Coachhouse And Offices, Baltilly				56°17′35″N 2°58′30″W	Category C(S)	2385	Upload Photo
St Helens, St Andrew's Road				56°17′37″N 2°58′07″W	Category B	2390	Upload Photo
17,19 Main Street				56°17′35″N 2°58′15″W	Category B	4284	Upload Photo
54 Main Street				56°17′36″N 2°58′22″W	Category C(S)	4288	Upload Photo
Bridgend House Including Ancillary Structures, Gatepiers, Boundary Walls And Walled Garden And 1 And 2 Back Latch, Bridgend Cottage				56°17′44″N 2°58′39″W	Category B	4299	Upload Photo
Craigrothie Mill And Detached Garage Block				56°17′18″N 3°00′01″W	Category B	2421	Upload Photo
Kilhill House				56°17′57″N 2°57′32″W	Category C(S)	2426	Upload Photo
3 Kirk Brae Ceres Parish Church (Formerly Main Street) Ceres				56°17′37″N 2°58′19″W	Category B	2363	Upload another image
Castlegate Farm, Castlegate, Ceres				56°17′31″N 2°58′10″W	Category C(S)	2373	Upload Photo
House And Shop (G Donaldson) Almac, Windsor House, Anstruther Road, Ceres				56°17′33″N 2°58′08″W	Category C(S)	2374	Upload Photo
17 Kirk Brae Mansefield (Former Manse) And Offices Curling Pond Road Off Main Street)				56°17′40″N 2°58′21″W	Category B	2381	Upload Photo
Ceres Inn (Former Volunteer Arms) The Cross, St Andrew's Road And Main Street, Ceres				56°17′33″N 2°58′15″W	Category B	2388	Upload Photo
Store Building Adjoining St Margaret's On East, Anstruther Road, Ceres				56°17′33″N 2°58′07″W	Category C(S)	2395	Upload Photo
Premises (D Kitching) Anstruther Road, Ceres				56°17′31″N 2°58′03″W	Category C(S)	2401	Upload Photo
St Andrew Road, The Cross, House (Beaton)				56°17′33″N 2°58′13″W	Category B	4290	Upload Photo
Bridgend, Catherine Bank, Coach House				56°17′43″N 2°58′38″W	Category B	4298	Upload Photo
House (John Webster, Northern House), South Croftdyke, Ceres				56°17′29″N 2°58′19″W	Category C(S)	2413	Upload Photo
Crawford Priory The Kennels Cottage (Near Clushford Toll)				56°17′29″N 3°02′38″W	Category B	2415	Upload Photo
Craigrothie House				56°17′18″N 3°00′03″W	Category B	2417	Upload Photo
Craigrothie Doocot				56°17′15″N 3°00′03″W	Category B	2420	Upload another image
Ye Kingarrach Inn (Formerly Craigrothie Inn), Main Street, Craigrothie				56°17′13″N 3°00′18″W	Category B	2422	Upload Photo
Craigrothie Bridge Over Craigrothie Burn				56°17′15″N 3°00′19″W	Category C(S)	2423	Upload Photo
Struthers Farmhouse				56°16′35″N 3°00′23″W	Category C(S)	2432	Upload Photo
Orchard Vaults And Associated Garden Walls, South Of St John's Lodge, Ceres				56°17′27″N 2°58′14″W	Category B	2369	Upload Photo
House (J W Mitchell) North Croftdyke, Ceres				56°17′32″N 2°58′20″W	Category C(S)	2377	Upload Photo
Cottages (Now Incorporated Into J W Mitchell's House) North Croftdyke, Ceres				56°17′32″N 2°58′21″W	Category C(S)	2378	Upload Photo
Ceres Academy Schoolmaster's House Schoolhill, Ceres				56°17′35″N 2°58′02″W	Category B	2406	Upload Photo
High Street, The Provost				56°17′32″N 2°58′13″W	Category B	4291	Upload another image See more images
Bridgend, Catherine Bank				56°17′44″N 2°58′37″W	Category B	4297	Upload Photo
Teassesmill House				56°17′07″N 2°58′21″W	Category B	4301	Upload Photo
Bog Well, South Croftdyke, Ceres				56°17′29″N 2°58′18″W	Category B	2410	Upload Photo
St Margaret's, Anstruther Road, Ceres				56°17′33″N 2°58′08″W	Category C(S)	2433	Upload Photo
Croft House North Croftdyke, Ceres				56°17′32″N 2°58′22″W	Category C(S)	2440	Upload Photo
Edenwood House				56°17′43″N 3°02′31″W	Category B	2443	Upload Photo
House (Mckellar) Castlegate, Ceres				56°17′30″N 2°58′13″W	Category C(S)	2370	Upload Photo
House (A D Mitchell) North Croftdyke, Ceres				56°17′31″N 2°58′20″W	Category C(S)	2376	Upload Photo
St Ann's St Andrew's Road, Ceres				56°17′34″N 2°58′11″W	Category B	2389	Upload Photo
Cottage (Mary L Borland) Anstruther Road, Ceres				56°17′31″N 2°58′04″W	Category C(S)	2399	Upload Photo
Cottage (J P Robertson) Anstruther Road, Ceres Including Garden Wall				56°17′31″N 2°58′04″W	Category C(S)	2400	Upload Photo
Bow Butts Bridge Over Ceres Burn Including Parapet Walls Of Approaches				56°17′32″N 2°58′16″W	Category B	2408	Upload another image

== Key ==
The scheme for classifying buildings in Scotland is:

- Category A: "buildings of national or international importance, either architectural or historic; or fine, little-altered examples of some particular period, style or building type."
- Category B: "buildings of regional or more than local importance; or major examples of some particular period, style or building type, which may have been altered."
- Category C: "buildings of local importance; lesser examples of any period, style, or building type, as originally constructed or moderately altered; and simple traditional buildings which group well with other listed buildings."

In March 2016 there were 47,288 listed buildings in Scotland. Of these, 8% were Category A, and 50% were Category B, with the remaining 42% being Category C.

== See also ==
- List of listed buildings in Fife
