= List of listed buildings in Balmerino =

This is a list of listed buildings in the parish of Balmerino in Fife, Scotland.

== List ==
Name	Location	Date listed	Grid ref. (Note: Sometimes known as OSGB36, the grid reference (where provided) is based on the British national grid reference system used by the Ordnance Survey. • "Guide to National Grid". Ordnance Survey. • "Get-a-map". Ordnance Survey.)	Geo-coordinates	Notes	LB number (Note: Historic Environment Scotland assign a unique alphanumeric identifier to each designated site in Scotland, for listed buildings this always begins with "LB", for example "LB12345".)	Image
Naughton Doocot				56°24′37″N 3°01′07″W	Category B	2536	Upload Photo
David Scrymgeour Wedderburn Memorial Square, Balmerino				56°24′33″N 3°02′33″W	Category B	2550	Upload another image
Balmerino Mill				56°24′44″N 3°02′34″W	Category B	2556	Upload another image
Priory Farm Steading				56°24′10″N 3°00′00″W	Category C(S)	45855	Upload Photo
Naughton House, Gardener's Lodge				56°24′35″N 3°00′38″W	Category B	2539	Upload Photo
Woodend House, Gauldry				56°24′04″N 3°00′19″W	Category B	2541	Upload Photo
Naughton House - Viaduct From House To Castle				56°24′37″N 3°00′58″W	Category B	2533	Upload Photo
Naughton House, Game Larder				56°24′38″N 3°00′58″W	Category C(S)	2537	Upload Photo
Naughton House, Old Laundry				56°24′41″N 3°00′57″W	Category C(S)	2538	Upload Photo
Bridge, Balmerino On Road From Abbey To Old Churchyard And Cemetery				56°24′40″N 3°02′30″W	Category C(S)	2555	Upload Photo
Holly Cottage, Kirkton Of Balmerino				56°24′51″N 3°02′07″W	Category C(S)	156	Upload Photo
Balmerino Farm, Stockman's House				56°24′39″N 3°02′34″W	Category C(S)	2554	Upload Photo
Birkhill House Icehouse				56°23′53″N 3°04′35″W	Category C(S)	2559	Upload Photo
Balmerino Parish Kirk				56°24′32″N 3°01′29″W	Category C(S)	2529	Upload another image
Birkhill Home Farm				56°23′35″N 3°04′27″W	Category C(S)	60	Upload Photo
Kilburns Farmhouse				56°24′56″N 3°00′48″W	Category B	4310	Upload Photo
Naughton Castle, Summerhouse To West Of				56°24′38″N 3°01′03″W	Category C(S)	2535	Upload Photo
Balgove Farmhouse, Gauldry				56°24′05″N 3°00′44″W	Category C(S)	2542	Upload Photo
Grange Doocot				56°23′39″N 3°02′20″W	Category B	2543	Upload Photo
Balmerino Abbey - Barn				56°24′37″N 3°02′33″W	Category A	2548	Upload Photo
Old Inn, Balmerino				56°24′39″N 3°02′32″W	Category B	2551	Upload Photo
Bridgend, Formerly The Neuk, Balmerino				56°24′40″N 3°02′32″W	Category C(S)	2552	Upload Photo
Naughton House Lodge And Gatepiers				56°24′28″N 3°01′02″W	Category B	2531	Upload Photo
Bridgend House And Commalon, Balmerino				56°24′40″N 3°02′33″W	Category C(S)	2553	Upload Photo
Manse Of Balmerino				56°24′32″N 3°01′33″W	Category C(S)	2530	Upload Photo
Naughton Castle				56°24′38″N 3°01′01″W	Category B	2534	Upload Photo
Balmerino Farm				56°24′37″N 3°02′30″W	Category B	2549	Upload Photo
Old Churchyard Of Balmerino (Excluding Modern Cemetery Extension)				56°24′44″N 3°02′18″W	Category B	2557	Upload Photo
Birkhill House				56°23′53″N 3°04′38″W	Category B	2558	Upload Photo
Naughton House				56°24′36″N 3°00′59″W	Category B	2532	Upload Photo

== Key ==
The scheme for classifying buildings in Scotland is:

- Category A: "buildings of national or international importance, either architectural or historic; or fine, little-altered examples of some particular period, style or building type."
- Category B: "buildings of regional or more than local importance; or major examples of some particular period, style or building type, which may have been altered."
- Category C: "buildings of local importance; lesser examples of any period, style, or building type, as originally constructed or moderately altered; and simple traditional buildings which group well with other listed buildings."

In March 2016 there were 47,288 listed buildings in Scotland. Of these, 8% were Category A, and 50% were Category B, with the remaining 42% being Category C.

== See also ==
- List of listed buildings in Fife
