= List of listed buildings in Dunbog, Fife =

This is a list of listed buildings in the parish of Dunbog in Fife, Scotland.

== List ==
Name	Location	Date listed	Grid ref. (Note: Sometimes known as OSGB36, the grid reference (where provided) is based on the British national grid reference system used by the Ordnance Survey. • "Guide to National Grid". Ordnance Survey. • "Get-a-map". Ordnance Survey.)	Geo-coordinates	Notes	LB number (Note: Historic Environment Scotland assign a unique alphanumeric identifier to each designated site in Scotland, for listed buildings this always begins with "LB", for example "LB12345".)	Image
Dunbog Parish Kirk				56°20′55″N 3°09′14″W	Category B	2197	Upload another image
Ayton Farmhouse				56°21′07″N 3°07′53″W	Category B	2201	Upload Photo
Denmuir Farm				56°21′25″N 3°07′49″W	Category B	2202	Upload Photo
Denmuir Doocot				56°21′25″N 3°07′46″W	Category B	2181	Upload Photo
Collairnie Steading				56°20′30″N 3°07′27″W	Category C(S)	2183	Upload Photo
Collairnie Farmhouse				56°20′27″N 3°07′26″W	Category B	2184	Upload Photo
Kirkyard Of Dunbog				56°20′57″N 3°09′30″W	Category C(S)	2198	Upload Photo
Dunbog School				56°21′11″N 3°09′08″W	Category C(S)	2199	Upload Photo

== Key ==
The scheme for classifying buildings in Scotland is:

- Category A: "buildings of national or international importance, either architectural or historic; or fine, little-altered examples of some particular period, style or building type."
- Category B: "buildings of regional or more than local importance; or major examples of some particular period, style or building type, which may have been altered."
- Category C: "buildings of local importance; lesser examples of any period, style, or building type, as originally constructed or moderately altered; and simple traditional buildings which group well with other listed buildings."

In March 2016 there were 47,288 listed buildings in Scotland. Of these, 8% were Category A, and 50% were Category B, with the remaining 42% being Category C.

== See also ==
- List of listed buildings in Fife
