= List of listed buildings in Newport-On-Tay, Fife =

This is a list of listed buildings in the parish of Newport-on-Tay in Fife, Scotland.

== List ==
Name	Location	Date listed	Grid ref. (Note: Sometimes known as OSGB36, the grid reference (where provided) is based on the British national grid reference system used by the Ordnance Survey. • "Guide to National Grid". Ordnance Survey. • "Get-a-map". Ordnance Survey.)	Geo-coordinates	Notes	LB number (Note: Historic Environment Scotland assign a unique alphanumeric identifier to each designated site in Scotland, for listed buildings this always begins with "LB", for example "LB12345".)	Image
60-64 Tay Street				56°26′34″N 2°56′23″W	Category B	38623	Upload Photo
Balmore Lodge, West Road				56°26′08″N 2°56′51″W	Category B	38637	Upload Photo
West Road Well				56°26′02″N 2°57′07″W	Category C(S)	38646	Upload Photo
East Newport, East Newport Station				56°26′25″N 2°56′06″W	Category B	12913	Upload Photo
2-14 (Even Nos) Boat Brae				56°26′15″N 2°56′41″W	Category B	49029	Upload Photo
Abercraig, 2 West Road				56°26′10″N 2°56′48″W	Category B	38630	Upload Photo
Trinity Uf Church				56°26′20″N 2°56′33″W	Category B	38632	Upload another image See more images
Seacraig, 66 Tay Street				56°26′36″N 2°56′23″W	Category C(S)	38624	Upload Photo
Tayfield House				56°26′12″N 2°56′23″W	Category B	38627	Upload Photo
Tayfield House, High Road Lodge				56°26′15″N 2°56′36″W	Category B	38629	Upload Photo
Broadhaugh, 44, 46 West Road				56°26′06″N 2°57′03″W	Category B	38640	Upload Photo
Greenbank, 2, 4 Shepherd's Road				56°26′06″N 2°56′55″W	Category C(S)	38648	Upload Photo
Tay Street, Canopied Drinking Fountain Including Railings And Stone Piers				56°26′30″N 2°56′27″W	Category B	49028	Upload Photo
8-10 Tay Street				56°26′27″N 2°56′26″W	Category C(S)	38620	Upload Photo
Ravenscraig, 58 Tay Street				56°26′33″N 2°56′23″W	Category C(S)	38622	Upload Photo
Newport Ferry Pier And Boat Road, Former Ferry Terminal Including Stone Setts				56°26′18″N 2°56′41″W	Category B	38631	Upload Photo
Newport Hotel, Boat Road And 1 High Street				56°26′21″N 2°56′32″W	Category B	38633	Upload Photo
Westwood Lodge, 5 High Road				56°26′12″N 2°56′41″W	Category B	38635	Upload Photo
Balmore, West Road				56°26′06″N 2°56′48″W	Category B	38636	Upload Photo
The Terrace, 28-34 And 36-42 West Road Including Railings, Gates And Gatepiers				56°26′06″N 2°57′01″W	Category B	38639	Upload Photo
Heathfield House 54-58 West Road				56°26′04″N 2°57′06″W	Category C(S)	38643	Upload Photo
Mars Cottage, 97 Riverside Road, Wormit Woodhaven				56°25′52″N 2°57′54″W	Category B	38650	Upload Photo
Ingleby 70 West Road				56°26′03″N 2°57′11″W	Category B	38644	Upload Photo
Joiner's Workshop, Woodhaven Pier				56°25′53″N 2°57′47″W	Category B	38649	Upload Photo
Boat Road, Milestone				56°26′16″N 2°56′39″W	Category C(S)	49031	Upload Photo
South Lodge, Tayfield House				56°25′59″N 2°56′14″W	Category B	38628	Upload Photo
The Castle 53-59 West Road				56°26′00″N 2°57′13″W	Category B	38645	Upload Photo
Woodhaven Farmhouse, 92 Riverside Road Wormit Woodhaven				56°21′04″N 3°14′13″W	Category B	38651	Upload Photo
23 Naughton Road Wormit				56°25′25″N 2°58′51″W	Category B	38652	Upload Photo
Canisbay Lodge, 56 Tay Street				56°26′33″N 2°56′24″W	Category C(S)	38621	Upload Photo
St. Mary's Episcopal Church, High Street And Blyth Hall Street				56°26′21″N 2°56′30″W	Category B	38625	Upload another image
Coal Office 4, 6 High Street				56°26′20″N 2°56′31″W	Category C(S)	38626	Upload Photo
Westwood (St Serf's Home) 3 High Road				56°26′10″N 2°56′35″W	Category B	38634	Upload Photo
Woodmoor, 4 West Road				56°26′08″N 2°56′53″W	Category C(S)	38638	Upload Photo
Rockcliffe And The Eyrie 48, 50 West Road				56°26′05″N 2°57′04″W	Category C(S)	38641	Upload Photo
Cupar Road, Milestone				56°26′06″N 2°56′12″W	Category C(S)	49030	Upload Photo
Blyth Street, Blyth Hall Including Flagpole				56°26′22″N 2°56′26″W	Category C(S)	44765	Upload Photo
Castle Cottage, 52 West Road				56°26′05″N 2°57′05″W	Category B	38642	Upload Photo
Lingarth, 9, 11 West Road				56°26′05″N 2°56′58″W	Category C(S)	38647	Upload Photo
St Fillan's Roman Catholic Church, 18 King Street, Newport On Tay				56°26′29″N 2°56′17″W	Category B	52123	Upload another image
Bee-House, Tayfield House				56°26′06″N 2°56′25″W	Category B	52157	Upload another image
Chesterhill House Including Walled Garden, Near Newport on Tay				56°26′17″N 2°54′45″W	Category C(S)	52287	Upload Photo

== Key ==
The scheme for classifying buildings in Scotland is:

- Category A: "buildings of national or international importance, either architectural or historic; or fine, little-altered examples of some particular period, style or building type."
- Category B: "buildings of regional or more than local importance; or major examples of some particular period, style or building type, which may have been altered."
- Category C: "buildings of local importance; lesser examples of any period, style, or building type, as originally constructed or moderately altered; and simple traditional buildings which group well with other listed buildings."

In March 2016 there were 47,288 listed buildings in Scotland. Of these, 8% were Category A, and 50% were Category B, with the remaining 42% being Category C.

== See also ==
- List of listed buildings in Fife
