= List of listed buildings in Largo, Fife =

This is a list of listed buildings in the parish of Largo in Fife, Scotland.

== List ==
Name	Location	Date listed	Grid ref. (Note: Sometimes known as OSGB36, the grid reference (where provided) is based on the British national grid reference system used by the Ordnance Survey. • "Guide to National Grid". Ordnance Survey. • "Get-a-map". Ordnance Survey.)	Geo-coordinates	Notes	LB number (Note: Historic Environment Scotland assign a unique alphanumeric identifier to each designated site in Scotland, for listed buildings this always begins with "LB", for example "LB12345".)	Image
Lower Largo Old Railway Viaduct				56°12′46″N 2°56′30″W	Category B	13705	Upload another image
Upper Largo, 26 High Street, Greycot				56°13′13″N 2°55′42″W	Category B	13017	Upload Photo
Balcormo Mains Steading				56°14′24″N 2°57′31″W	Category C(S)	8933	Upload Photo
Upper Largo St Andrew's Road Wood's Hospital				56°13′16″N 2°55′44″W	Category B	8968	Upload Photo
Lundin Tower Dovecot				56°12′58″N 2°58′08″W	Category B	8956	Upload another image
Strathairly House				56°13′06″N 2°54′54″W	Category B	8959	Upload another image
Upper Largo 18 South Feus Largo Cottage				56°13′09″N 2°55′45″W	Category C(S)	8973	Upload Photo
Lower Largo Main Street Cardy Networks				56°12′46″N 2°55′59″W	Category B	8981	Upload Photo
Lower Largo 90, 92 Main Street, Bower House				56°12′46″N 2°56′10″W	Category C(S)	8983	Upload Photo
Upper Largo Largo Home Farm Dovecot				56°13′16″N 2°56′23″W	Category B	8988	Upload another image
Upper Largo Largo Road Eaglegate Gatepiers				56°13′02″N 2°55′53″W	Category B	8991	Upload Photo
Upper Largo 4 North Feus Struan				56°13′16″N 2°55′47″W	Category B	8994	Upload Photo
Upper Largo St Andrews Road Eden Cottage				56°13′17″N 2°55′40″W	Category B	13706	Upload Photo
Gilston East Mains Farmhouse And Steading				56°15′19″N 2°54′19″W	Category B	8935	Upload Photo
Lower Largo 8 Drummochy Road				56°12′45″N 2°56′32″W	Category C(S)	8937	Upload Photo
Lower Largo 16 Drummochy Road Drummochy House				56°12′44″N 2°56′33″W	Category B	8939	Upload Photo
Lower Largo 20 Drummochy Road Bellevue				56°12′44″N 2°56′34″W	Category C(S)	8940	Upload Photo
Lower Largo 1 (The Railway Inn) And 3 (Lea-Rig) Station Wynd				56°12′44″N 2°56′28″W	Category C(S)	8948	Upload Photo
Strathairly House Dovecot At Walled Garden				56°13′07″N 2°54′56″W	Category B	8962	Upload Photo
Upper Largo Largo Home Farmhouse				56°13′17″N 2°56′15″W	Category B	8967	Upload Photo
Upper Largo 16 South Feus The Grange				56°13′09″N 2°55′44″W	Category C(S)	8972	Upload Photo
22, 24, 26 South Feus, Upper Largo (Formerly 1, 2, 3 South Feus)				56°13′09″N 2°55′48″W	Category C(S)	8974	Upload Photo
Lower Largo 122 Main Street				56°12′47″N 2°56′04″W	Category C(S)	8985	Upload Photo
Upper Largo Largo Home Farm Old Largo House Walled Garden				56°13′14″N 2°56′14″W	Category C(S)	8987	Upload Photo
Lower Largo 119 And West Part 121 Main Street				56°12′47″N 2°56′05″W	Category B	8914	Upload Photo
Buckthorns Farm House				56°13′07″N 2°55′18″W	Category B	8934	Upload Photo
Lower Largo Drummochy Road Drum Lodge				56°12′43″N 2°56′45″W	Category B	8942	Upload Photo
Lower Largo 99, 101, 103, 105 Main Street (Former 1-4 Inclusive Main Street)				56°12′47″N 2°56′08″W	Category B	8947	Upload Photo
Pratis Farm House And Steading				56°14′39″N 2°59′56″W	Category B	8958	Upload Photo
Strathairly Farmhouse (Otherwise Known As Keirs)				56°13′18″N 2°55′05″W	Category B	8960	Upload Photo
Upper Largo, Church Place, Parish Church Manse				56°13′15″N 2°55′55″W	Category B	8963	Upload another image
Upper Largo 28 Church Place Parish Church Room				56°13′13″N 2°55′54″W	Category B	8964	Upload Photo
Lower Largo 100, 102 Main Street				56°12′46″N 2°56′08″W	Category C(S)	8984	Upload Photo
Lower Largo 123 Main Street (Formerly East End Cottages)				56°12′47″N 2°56′02″W	Category C(S)	8915	Upload Photo
Upper Largo, 30, 32 Church Place				56°13′13″N 2°55′53″W	Category C(S)	13016	Upload Photo
Lower Largo Drummochy Road Keilside Cottage				56°12′45″N 2°56′32″W	Category B	8938	Upload Photo
Lower Largo 79 Main Street Court House				56°12′46″N 2°56′13″W	Category B	8945	Upload Photo
Upper Largo 8 South Feus, Carlton				56°13′10″N 2°55′41″W	Category C(S)	8969	Upload Photo
Upper Largo 10, 12 (Seafield) South Feus				56°13′10″N 2°55′42″W	Category C(S)	8970	Upload Photo
Lower Largo 6 Main Street (Baptist Meeting House)				56°12′43″N 2°56′28″W	Category B	8982	Upload Photo
Upper Largo Largo House Gatepiers At East Entrance				56°13′13″N 2°55′55″W	Category B	8992	Upload Photo
Lundin Links 21 Crescent Road Old Field				56°12′46″N 2°57′00″W	Category B	8950	Upload Photo
Lundin Links 25 Crescent Road Bourtree Brae House				56°12′45″N 2°56′56″W	Category B	8951	Upload Photo
Lundin Links 35 Woodlands Road				56°12′47″N 2°56′44″W	Category B	8954	Upload Photo
Lundin Tower				56°12′55″N 2°58′14″W	Category B	8955	Upload another image
Upper Largo 52, 54 High Street Lawview				56°13′15″N 2°55′30″W	Category C(S)	8965	Upload Photo
Lower Largo Main Street Cardy Cottage				56°12′47″N 2°56′02″W	Category C(S)	8980	Upload Photo
Lower Largo Main Street, Cardy House				56°12′47″N 2°56′00″W	Category B	8916	Upload Photo
Upper Largo, 2 St Andrews Road, St Andrew's Cottage				56°13′14″N 2°55′42″W	Category B	13018	Upload Photo
Lower Largo Drummochy Road Net House				56°12′42″N 2°56′36″W	Category B	8941	Upload Photo
Lower Largo 57 Main Street				56°12′44″N 2°56′17″W	Category B	8944	Upload Photo
Lundin Links, Former Mill Off Mill Wynd				56°12′55″N 2°56′50″W	Category C(S)	8953	Upload Photo
Upper Largo Largo House				56°13′11″N 2°56′10″W	Category B	8966	Upload another image
Upper Largo Largo Parish Church And Church Yard				56°13′14″N 2°55′51″W	Category B	8989	Upload another image
Upper Largo 3 North Feus Rose Cottage				56°13′16″N 2°55′51″W	Category B	8993	Upload Photo
Lower Largo Bridgend House And Out Buildings				56°12′45″N 2°56′28″W	Category C(S)	8936	Upload Photo
Lower Largo 21 And 23 Main Street, Old Manse				56°12′44″N 2°56′24″W	Category B	8943	Upload Photo
Lundin Links 15 Crescent Road (Old Calabar)				56°12′47″N 2°57′03″W	Category B	8949	Upload another image
Lundin Links 23 Largo Road				56°12′58″N 2°56′53″W	Category C(S)	8952	Upload another image
Strathairly Lodge				56°13′17″N 2°55′08″W	Category B	8961	Upload another image
Upper Largo 14 South Feus South View				56°13′10″N 2°55′43″W	Category C(S)	8971	Upload another image
Upper Largo Largo Road Eaglegate Lodge				56°13′03″N 2°55′54″W	Category C(S)	8990	Upload another image
Upper Largo St Andrews Road Lyndhurst				56°13′19″N 2°55′39″W	Category B	8995	Upload another image

== Key ==
The scheme for classifying buildings in Scotland is:

- Category A: "buildings of national or international importance, either architectural or historic; or fine, little-altered examples of some particular period, style or building type."
- Category B: "buildings of regional or more than local importance; or major examples of some particular period, style or building type, which may have been altered."
- Category C: "buildings of local importance; lesser examples of any period, style, or building type, as originally constructed or moderately altered; and simple traditional buildings which group well with other listed buildings."

In March 2016 there were 47,288 listed buildings in Scotland. Of these, 8% were Category A, and 50% were Category B, with the remaining 42% being Category C.

== See also ==
- List of listed buildings in Fife
