= List of listed buildings in Auchtertool, Fife =

This is a list of listed buildings in the parish of Auchtertool in Fife, Scotland.

== List ==
Name	Location	Date listed	Grid ref. (Note: Sometimes known as OSGB36, the grid reference (where provided) is based on the British national grid reference system used by the Ordnance Survey. • "Guide to National Grid". Ordnance Survey. • "Get-a-map". Ordnance Survey.)	Geo-coordinates	Notes	LB number (Note: Historic Environment Scotland assign a unique alphanumeric identifier to each designated site in Scotland, for listed buildings this always begins with "LB", for example "LB12345".)	Image
Auchtertool Village, Auchtertool House Including Boundary Walls, Gatepiers And Gates				56°06′08″N 3°15′42″W	Category B	3670	Upload Photo
Auchtertool Village, 11 The Maltings And Main Street Including Gatepiers				56°06′10″N 3°15′40″W	Category C(S)	3673	Upload Photo
Auchtertool Manse Including Boundary Walls, Gatepiers And Gate				56°05′53″N 3°16′37″W	Category B	3669	Upload Photo
Auchtertool Parish Church (Church Of Scotland)				56°05′52″N 3°16′31″W	Category C(S)	3668	Upload another image
Auchtertool Parish Church Graveyard, Stones, Boundary Walls, Gatepiers, And Gates				56°05′52″N 3°16′32″W	Category C(S)	46875	Upload Photo
Auchtertool Village, Main Street, Milton Bank With Ancillary Buildings And Boundary Walls				56°06′07″N 3°15′23″W	Category C(S)	3671	Upload Photo
Clentrie House (Formerly East Clentrie House)				56°06′30″N 3°14′39″W	Category B	3672	Upload Photo

== Key ==
The scheme for classifying buildings in Scotland is:

- Category A: "buildings of national or international importance, either architectural or historic; or fine, little-altered examples of some particular period, style or building type."
- Category B: "buildings of regional or more than local importance; or major examples of some particular period, style or building type, which may have been altered."
- Category C: "buildings of local importance; lesser examples of any period, style, or building type, as originally constructed or moderately altered; and simple traditional buildings which group well with other listed buildings."

In March 2016 there were 47,288 listed buildings in Scotland. Of these, 8% were Category A, and 50% were Category B, with the remaining 42% being Category C.

== See also ==
- List of listed buildings in Fife
