= List of listed buildings in Saline, Fife =

This is a list of listed buildings in the parish of Saline in Fife, Scotland.

== List ==
Name	Location	Date listed	Grid ref. (Note: Sometimes known as OSGB36, the grid reference (where provided) is based on the British national grid reference system used by the Ordnance Survey. • "Guide to National Grid". Ordnance Survey. • "Get-a-map". Ordnance Survey.)	Geo-coordinates	Notes	LB number (Note: Historic Environment Scotland assign a unique alphanumeric identifier to each designated site in Scotland, for listed buildings this always begins with "LB", for example "LB12345".)	Image
Tower By Saline Burn, Garden Of Glenburn Cottage, 14 Bridge Street, Saline				56°06′55″N 3°34′20″W	Category C(S)	17018	Upload Photo
6, 8, 10 North Road (Drumcapie Place) Saline				56°06′56″N 3°34′26″W	Category C(S)	17019	Upload Photo
2-4 And 6 Bridge Street, Saline				56°06′55″N 3°34′25″W	Category C(S)	17024	Upload Photo
20 Montana Cottage; 22 And 24; 26 And 28 (Kandy Cottage) North Road, Saline				56°07′01″N 3°34′34″W	Category B	16999	Upload Photo
Garden Hut Devonside				56°07′25″N 3°35′16″W	Category C(S)	17006	Upload Photo
Burnside Bridge, Over Black Devon				56°07′21″N 3°35′08″W	Category B	17007	Upload Photo
Sandydub Shieldbank Farm				56°07′34″N 3°35′38″W	Category B	17008	Upload Photo
Hallcroft Farmhouse				56°08′22″N 3°33′52″W	Category B	17011	Upload Photo
Old Toll House, Hillend				56°08′31″N 3°33′13″W	Category C(S)	17012	Upload Photo
1, 3 Bridge Street, Saline				56°06′56″N 3°34′24″W	Category C(S)	17020	Upload Photo
'Claverley' West Road, Saline				56°06′54″N 3°34′32″W	Category B	17026	Upload Photo
38 North Road, Saline				56°07′04″N 3°34′39″W	Category C(S)	17001	Upload Photo
Balgoner Bridge Over Black Devon				56°07′35″N 3°34′32″W	Category B	17010	Upload Photo
'Northwood' (Formerly Saline Manse) 20 Bridge Street Saline				56°06′58″N 3°34′15″W	Category B	17016	Upload Photo
Leckerstone Farmhouse				56°07′10″N 3°34′14″W	Category B	14883	Upload Photo
9 Bridge Street Saline				56°06′56″N 3°34′23″W	Category C(S)	17022	Upload Photo
9 (Yew Cottage) And 11 (Ivy Cottage) Main Street, Saline				56°06′49″N 3°34′11″W	Category B	17028	Upload Photo
Devonside Farm Steading				56°07′24″N 3°35′19″W	Category C(S)	17004	Upload Photo
Saline, West Road, West Cottage				56°06′59″N 3°34′57″W	Category C(S)	17005	Upload Photo
Grey Craig House				56°07′38″N 3°34′29″W	Category B	17009	Upload Photo
Saline Bridge Over Saline Burn, Saline				56°06′56″N 3°34′21″W	Category C(S)	17023	Upload Photo
Saline Village Saline Parish Kirk Main Street, Saline				56°06′53″N 3°34′23″W	Category B	17029	Upload Photo
30, 32, 34 North Road Saline				56°07′03″N 3°34′37″W	Category C(S)	17000	Upload Photo
Mile Posts On A823 Dunfermline/Rumbling Bridge				56°08′25″N 3°32′16″W	Category C(S)	45592	Upload Photo
Sheardrum Farmhouse And Steading				56°07′56″N 3°33′17″W	Category B	43865	Upload Photo
'Gateside House,' 19 Bridge Street				56°06′57″N 3°34′18″W	Category B	17025	Upload Photo
Upper Kinneddar House				56°06′40″N 3°34′23″W	Category B	16995	Upload Photo
"The Temple", Bandrum				56°06′31″N 3°33′02″W	Category C(S)	16996	Upload Photo
Hillside House				56°08′20″N 3°32′34″W	Category B	17013	Upload Photo
Devonside Farmhouse				56°07′23″N 3°35′19″W	Category B	17003	Upload Photo
Craig House				56°06′48″N 3°34′24″W	Category B	14881	Upload Photo
Saline Village, Bridge Street, Former Free Church				56°06′57″N 3°34′20″W	Category B	18962	Upload Photo
Tullohill House				56°07′00″N 3°34′08″W	Category B	16997	Upload Photo
Tullohill Cottage				56°07′01″N 3°34′12″W	Category C(S)	16998	Upload Photo
Saline Parish Session House, Saline Kirkyard, Saline				56°06′53″N 3°34′24″W	Category B	17015	Upload Photo
5 Bridge Street (Smithy House) Saline				56°06′56″N 3°34′24″W	Category C(S)	17021	Upload Photo
'Prestonfield' West Road, Saline				56°06′54″N 3°34′34″W	Category B	17027	Upload another image
Nether Kinneddar House				56°06′33″N 3°34′13″W	Category B	16994	Upload Photo
Preston Place West Road Saline				56°06′59″N 3°34′57″W	Category C(S)	17002	Upload Photo
Black Devon Bridge Over Black Devon, West Saline				56°07′36″N 3°37′44″W	Category C(S)	17014	Upload Photo

== Key ==
The scheme for classifying buildings in Scotland is:

- Category A: "buildings of national or international importance, either architectural or historic; or fine, little-altered examples of some particular period, style or building type."
- Category B: "buildings of regional or more than local importance; or major examples of some particular period, style or building type, which may have been altered."
- Category C: "buildings of local importance; lesser examples of any period, style, or building type, as originally constructed or moderately altered; and simple traditional buildings which group well with other listed buildings."

In March 2016 there were 47,288 listed buildings in Scotland. Of these, 8% were Category A, and 50% were Category B, with the remaining 42% being Category C.

== See also ==
- List of listed buildings in Fife
