= List of listed buildings in Tulliallan, Fife =

This is a list of listed buildings in the parish of Tulliallan in Fife, Scotland.

== List ==
Name	Location	Date listed	Grid ref. (Note: Sometimes known as OSGB36, the grid reference (where provided) is based on the British national grid reference system used by the Ordnance Survey. • "Guide to National Grid". Ordnance Survey. • "Get-a-map". Ordnance Survey.)	Geo-coordinates	Notes	LB number (Note: Historic Environment Scotland assign a unique alphanumeric identifier to each designated site in Scotland, for listed buildings this always begins with "LB", for example "LB12345".)	Image
Former Churchyard And Keith Mausoleum, Tulliallan				56°05′12″N 3°42′16″W	Category B	17130	Upload Photo
15-31 Keith Street Inclusive (All Odd Numbers) Kincardine-On-Forth				56°04′02″N 3°43′11″W	Category C(S)	16576	Upload Photo
Blackhall Lodge And Gateway Tulliallan Policies				56°04′30″N 3°43′09″W	Category B	16587	Upload Photo
4 And 6, 8, 10 High Street Kincardine-On-Forth				56°04′06″N 3°43′05″W	Category C(S)	16589	Upload Photo
36 ('Rosevale'); 38 And 40; 42; 44 Kilbagie Street Kincardine-On-Forth				56°04′12″N 3°43′14″W	Category B	16594	Upload Photo
"Primrose Villa', 60 Kilbagie Street Kincardine-On-Forth				56°04′14″N 3°43′15″W	Category B	16595	Upload Photo
Kincardine Church Of Scotland Chapel Street Kincardine-On-Forth				56°04′03″N 3°43′05″W	Category B	16601	Upload another image
32 And 34; 36; 38 And 40; 42 High Street Kincardine-On-Forth				56°04′08″N 3°43′03″W	Category B	16603	Upload Photo
22 Elphinstone Street Kincardine-On-Forth				56°04′07″N 3°43′11″W	Category C(S)	16608	Upload Photo
20 Excise Street Kincardine-On-Forth				56°04′06″N 3°43′11″W	Category B	16609	Upload Photo
22, 24 Excise Street Kincardine-On-Forth				56°04′06″N 3°43′11″W	Category B	16610	Upload Photo
Commercial Hotel, 2 Elphinstone Street Kincardine-On-Forth				56°04′06″N 3°43′07″W	Category B	16624	Upload Photo
3, 5 Chapel Street Kincardine-On-Forth				56°04′05″N 3°43′06″W	Category B	16625	Upload Photo
22-38 Hawkhill Road, Kincardine On Forth				56°04′23″N 3°43′22″W	Category C(S)	15047	Upload Photo
16 Forth Street, Railway Tavern				56°04′03″N 3°43′21″W	Category C(S)	51130	Upload Photo
Kincardine House 10 Walker Street Kincardine-On-Forth				56°03′59″N 3°43′06″W	Category B	16581	Upload Photo
2-20 Hawkhill Road Inclusive (All Even Numbers) Kincardine-On-Forth				56°04′22″N 3°43′21″W	Category C(S)	16583	Upload Photo
28 High Street (In Wynd) Kincardine-On-Forth				56°04′07″N 3°43′04″W	Category C(S)	16592	Upload Photo
30 High Street Kincardine-On-Forth				56°04′07″N 3°43′04″W	Category B	16593	Upload Photo
44 High Street Kincardine-On-Forth				56°04′08″N 3°43′02″W	Category C(S)	16604	Upload Photo
11, 13, 15, 17 Elphinstone Street Kincardine-On-Forth				56°04′06″N 3°43′10″W	Category C(S)	16606	Upload Photo
Masonic Hall Lodge Tulliallan No 598 8, 10 Elphinstone Street Kincardine-On-Forth				56°04′07″N 3°43′09″W	Category C(S)	16607	Upload Photo
17, 19 Excise Street Kincardine-On-Forth				56°04′07″N 3°43′13″W	Category C(S)	16611	Upload Photo
18, 18A, 20 Kirk St Kincardine-On-Forth				56°04′11″N 3°43′00″W	Category B	16622	Upload Photo
Kincardine Market Cross, High Street, Kincardine-On-Forth				56°04′07″N 3°43′06″W	Category B	16623	Upload Photo
42 And 48 ('Grangeview') Keith Street Kincardine-On-Forth				56°04′01″N 3°43′15″W	Category C(S)	16580	Upload Photo
12, 14, 16 And 18, 20 High Street Kincardine-On-Forth				56°04′06″N 3°43′05″W	Category C(S)	16590	Upload Photo
"Ye Olde House 25, 26 Forth Street Kincardine-On-Forth				56°04′00″N 3°43′18″W	Category B	16598	Upload Photo
5 Excise Lane Kincardine-On-Forth				56°04′04″N 3°43′11″W	Category C(S)	16612	Upload Photo
Tulliallan Parish Church, Kirk Street, Kincardine On Forth				56°04′19″N 3°42′59″W	Category B	15046	Upload another image
Kincardine-On-Forth, 11 Station Road				56°04′06″N 3°43′15″W	Category C(S)	17132	Upload Photo
52 Mercer Street Kincardine-On-Forth				56°04′06″N 3°42′58″W	Category C(S)	17133	Upload Photo
32, 34, 36 Keith Street Kincardine-On-Forth				56°04′02″N 3°43′14″W	Category B	16578	Upload Photo
38 Keith Street Kincardine-On-Forth				56°04′01″N 3°43′15″W	Category B	16579	Upload Photo
24, 26 Kirk Street, Kincardine-On-Forth				56°04′12″N 3°42′59″W	Category C(S)	16621	Upload Photo
3, 5 Excise Street Kincardine-On-Forth				56°04′04″N 3°43′10″W	Category C(S)	16573	Upload Photo
Kincardine, Tulliallan Castle (Scottish Police College), Walled Garden Including Conservatory And Glasshouses, Potting Shed, Free Standing Glasshouse, Boiler House, Boundary Walls And Sundial				56°04′37″N 3°42′58″W	Category B	49037	Upload Photo
Kincardine Bridge				56°03′55″N 3°43′38″W	Category A	50078	Upload Photo
Sands Doocot - Lurg Farm				56°03′35″N 3°41′20″W	Category B	17131	Upload Photo
26, 28, 30 Keith Street Kincardine-On-Forth				56°04′02″N 3°43′14″W	Category B	16577	Upload Photo
22, 24, 26 High Street Kincardine-On-Forth				56°04′07″N 3°43′04″W	Category B	16591	Upload Photo
5, 7, 9 Elphinstone Street Kincardine-On-Forth				56°04′06″N 3°43′09″W	Category B	16605	Upload Photo
Kincardine Rc Chapel 6 Coopers Lane Kincardine-On-Forth				56°04′05″N 3°43′09″W	Category B	16613	Upload Photo
'The Orchard' 24 Kilbagie Street Kincardine-On-Forth				56°04′10″N 3°43′13″W	Category B	16614	Upload Photo
50-52 Kirk Street, Kincardine-On-Forth				56°04′16″N 3°42′58″W	Category C(S)	16619	Upload Photo
63 Mercer Street Kincardine-On-Forth				56°04′07″N 3°42′56″W	Category B	17134	Upload Photo
Tulliallan Doocot Blackhall, Tulliallan Policies				56°04′35″N 3°43′05″W	Category B	17143	Upload Photo
Tulliallan Castle (Scottish Police College)				56°04′25″N 3°42′38″W	Category A	16585	Upload Photo
54 Keith Street Kincardine-On-Forth				56°04′00″N 3°43′17″W	Category B	16597	Upload Photo
63, 65 Kilbagie Street Kincardine-On-Forth				56°04′16″N 3°43′17″W	Category C(S)	16575	Upload Photo
Burnbrae House Kincardine-On-Forth				56°04′09″N 3°42′37″W	Category B	16582	Upload Photo
2 High Street And 1 Chapel Street, Kincardine-On-Forth				56°04′05″N 3°43′06″W	Category B	16588	Upload Photo
"Lucker" 23 Forth Street Kincardine-On-Forth				56°04′01″N 3°43′20″W	Category C(S)	16599	Upload Photo
16 Regent Street. Kincardine-On-Forth				56°04′02″N 3°42′58″W	Category B	16602	Upload Photo
71, 73 Kirk Street And Tulliallan Session House				56°04′18″N 3°42′57″W	Category C(S)	16618	Upload Photo
14 And 16 Excise Street Kincardine-On-Forth				56°04′05″N 3°43′11″W	Category B	16574	Upload Photo
Tulliallan Old Parish Church				56°04′25″N 3°42′52″W	Category B	16584	Upload Photo
Inch House And Garden Walls				56°03′45″N 3°42′35″W	Category B	16586	Upload Photo
52 Keith Street Kincardine-On-Forth				56°04′01″N 3°43′17″W	Category B	16596	Upload Photo
"Shore House". 21 Forth Street, Kincardine-On-Forth				56°04′01″N 3°43′21″W	Category B	16600	Upload Photo
44, 46 Kirk Street. Kincardine-On-Forth				56°04′15″N 3°42′58″W	Category C(S)	16620	Upload Photo

== Key ==
The scheme for classifying buildings in Scotland is:

- Category A: "buildings of national or international importance, either architectural or historic; or fine, little-altered examples of some particular period, style or building type."
- Category B: "buildings of regional or more than local importance; or major examples of some particular period, style or building type, which may have been altered."
- Category C: "buildings of local importance; lesser examples of any period, style, or building type, as originally constructed or moderately altered; and simple traditional buildings which group well with other listed buildings."

In March 2016 there were 47,288 listed buildings in Scotland. Of these, 8% were Category A, and 50% were Category B, with the remaining 42% being Category C.

== See also ==
- List of listed buildings in Fife
