= List of listed buildings in Newburn, Fife =

This is a list of listed buildings in the parish of Newburn in Fife, Scotland.

== List ==
Name	Location	Date listed	Grid ref. (Note: Sometimes known as OSGB36, the grid reference (where provided) is based on the British national grid reference system used by the Ordnance Survey. • "Guide to National Grid". Ordnance Survey. • "Get-a-map". Ordnance Survey.)	Geo-coordinates	Notes	LB number (Note: Historic Environment Scotland assign a unique alphanumeric identifier to each designated site in Scotland, for listed buildings this always begins with "LB", for example "LB12345".)	Image
Coates House				56°13′28″N 2°53′38″W	Category B	19131	Upload Photo
Balchrystie House				56°13′00″N 2°52′21″W	Category B	15493	Upload Photo
Gilston House Boathouse				56°14′58″N 2°53′30″W	Category B	15502	Upload another image
Newburn House (Former Parish Manse) And Offices				56°13′15″N 2°53′54″W	Category B	15511	Upload Photo
Coates House, Garden Walls And Bridge				56°13′33″N 2°53′37″W	Category C(S)	19132	Upload Photo
Gilston House				56°14′57″N 2°53′21″W	Category B	15495	Upload another image
Newburn Parish School, Schoolhouse And Hall				56°13′16″N 2°54′01″W	Category B	15499	Upload Photo
Gilston House Gate-Piers At South Gate				56°14′51″N 2°53′08″W	Category C(S)	15501	Upload Photo
Gilston House Cottage At Offices, Near Walled Garden				56°14′57″N 2°53′11″W	Category C(S)	15503	Upload Photo
Kirk House (Former Parish Kirk), Former Session House, Enclosing Wall And Gatepiers				56°13′10″N 2°53′32″W	Category B	15507	Upload Photo
Laurelbank And Laurelbank Cottage				56°13′08″N 2°54′02″W	Category C(S)	15510	Upload Photo
Gilston House Walled Garden				56°14′55″N 2°53′07″W	Category C(S)	15496	Upload Photo
West Coates Farmhouse				56°13′34″N 2°53′40″W	Category B	15500	Upload Photo
Gilston House Summer House				56°15′01″N 2°53′35″W	Category B	15505	Upload Photo
Lahill Mains Farmhouse				56°13′44″N 2°54′02″W	Category C(S)	15509	Upload Photo
Balchrystie House, Gatepiers And Railings				56°12′59″N 2°52′28″W	Category C(S)	19130	Upload Photo
Gilston House Former Stable				56°14′58″N 2°53′11″W	Category B	15504	Upload Photo
Lahill House				56°13′26″N 2°53′52″W	Category B	15508	Upload Photo
Balchrystie House Garden House				56°13′02″N 2°52′25″W	Category B	15494	Upload Photo
Gilston House Sundial				56°14′58″N 2°53′19″W	Category C(S)	15506	Upload Photo

== Key ==
The scheme for classifying buildings in Scotland is:

- Category A: "buildings of national or international importance, either architectural or historic; or fine, little-altered examples of some particular period, style or building type."
- Category B: "buildings of regional or more than local importance; or major examples of some particular period, style or building type, which may have been altered."
- Category C: "buildings of local importance; lesser examples of any period, style, or building type, as originally constructed or moderately altered; and simple traditional buildings which group well with other listed buildings."

In March 2016 there were 47,288 listed buildings in Scotland. Of these, 8% were Category A, and 50% were Category B, with the remaining 42% being Category C.

== See also ==
- List of listed buildings in Fife
