= List of listed buildings in Logie, Fife =

This is a list of listed buildings in the parish of Logie in Fife, Scotland.

== List ==
| Name | Location | Date listed | Grid ref. (Note: Sometimes known as OSGB36, the grid reference (where provided) is based on the British national grid reference system used by the Ordnance Survey. • "Guide to National Grid". Ordnance Survey. • "Get-a-map". Ordnance Survey.) | Geo-coordinates | Notes | LB number (Note: Historic Environment Scotland assign a unique alphanumeric identifier to each designated site in Scotland, for listed buildings this always begins with "LB", for example "LB12345".) | Image |
|---|---|---|---|---|---|---|---|
| Logie Village Lucklaw House And Offices (Former Parish Manse) | | | | 56°22′23″N 2°57′56″W | Category B | 8653 | Upload Photo |
| Logie House | | | | 56°22′27″N 2°57′35″W | Category B | 8649 | Upload Photo |
| Logie House Walled Garden | | | | 56°22′26″N 2°57′39″W | Category B | 8651 | Upload Photo |
| Logie Village Elizabeth Sharp Memorial Hall (Former Parish Church), Cemetery Walls And Gatepiers | | | | 56°22′20″N 2°57′57″W | Category C(S) | 8652 | Upload Photo |
| Logie House Dovecote | | | | 56°22′26″N 2°57′37″W | Category C(S) | 8650 | Upload Photo |
| Logie Village, K6 Telephone Kiosk Close To Parish Church | | | | 56°22′18″N 2°57′56″W | Category B | 8655 | Upload Photo |
| Wester Forrest Farm House And Steading | | | | 56°22′25″N 2°59′44″W | Category B | 8654 | Upload Photo |

== Key ==
The scheme for classifying buildings in Scotland is:

- Category A: "buildings of national or international importance, either architectural or historic; or fine, little-altered examples of some particular period, style or building type."
- Category B: "buildings of regional or more than local importance; or major examples of some particular period, style or building type, which may have been altered."
- Category C: "buildings of local importance; lesser examples of any period, style, or building type, as originally constructed or moderately altered; and simple traditional buildings which group well with other listed buildings."

In March 2016 there were 47,288 listed buildings in Scotland. Of these, 8% were Category A, and 50% were Category B, with the remaining 42% being Category C.

== See also ==
- List of listed buildings in Fife
