= List of listed buildings in Scoonie, Fife =

This is a list of listed buildings in the parish of Scoonie in Fife, Scotland.

== List ==
| Name | Location | Date listed | Geo-coordinates | Notes | Category | LB number | Image |
|---|---|---|---|---|---|---|---|
| Durie Policies, Durie Ice House | | | 56°12′43″N 3°00′45″W | | C(S) | 16700 | Upload Photo |
| Kilmux House | | | 56°13′55″N 3°01′26″W | | B | 16702 | Upload Photo |
| Silverburn House Estate, Cottages, Nos 1, 2, And 3 | | | 56°12′24″N 2°58′42″W | | C(S) | 16703 | Upload Photo |
| Drummaird Farmhouse, Steading And Boundary Walls | | | 56°13′08″N 3°01′59″W | | C(S) | 46483 | Upload Photo |
| Burnside Of Letham Including Watermill With Wheel And Steading | | | 56°13′31″N 3°01′03″W | | B | 49899 | Upload Photo |
| Durie House With Court Of Offices, Sundial And Walled Garden | | | 56°12′43″N 3°00′43″W | | A | 16699 | Upload another image |
| Kilmux Farm Steading | | | 56°14′00″N 3°01′20″W | | B | 46485 | Upload Photo |
| Silverburn House Estate, Corriemar | | | 56°12′21″N 2°58′56″W | | C(S) | 16680 | Upload Photo |
| Kilmux Lodge House With Boundary Walls | | | 56°13′51″N 3°01′31″W | | C(S) | 46487 | Upload Photo |
| Kilmux Farmhouse With Boundary Walls | | | 56°14′01″N 3°01′17″W | | B | 46484 | Upload Photo |
| Kilmux House, Walled Garden | | | 56°13′56″N 3°01′22″W | | C(S) | 46486 | Upload Photo |
| Montrave Home Farm, Montrave Doocot | | | 56°14′55″N 3°00′18″W | | B | 42444 | Upload Photo |
| Silverburn House Estate, Offices Including Gatepiers | | | 56°12′22″N 2°58′43″W | | B | 16679 | Upload Photo |
| Durie Home Farm, Durie Dovecot | | | 56°12′36″N 3°00′57″W | | B | 16701 | Upload another image |
| Montrave House (Formerly Montrave Steading) | | | 56°14′51″N 3°00′24″W | | C(S) | 51932 | Upload Photo |

== Key ==
The scheme for classifying buildings in Scotland is:

- Category A: "buildings of national or international importance, either architectural or historic; or fine, little-altered examples of some particular period, style or building type."
- Category B: "buildings of regional or more than local importance; or major examples of some particular period, style or building type, which may have been altered."
- Category C: "buildings of local importance; lesser examples of any period, style, or building type, as originally constructed or moderately altered; and simple traditional buildings which group well with other listed buildings."

In March 2016 there were 47,288 listed buildings in Scotland. Of these, 8% were Category A, and 50% were Category B, with the remaining 42% being Category C.

== See also ==
- List of listed buildings in Fife
