= Alexander Leighton (writer) =

Scottish man of letters

Alexander Leighton (1800–1874) was a Scottish writer, known as the editor of Tales of the Borders.

== Life ==
Born at Dundee, he studied at the Dundee Academy, and then took up medicine at the University of Edinburgh. He worked as a lawyer's clerk in Edinburgh, and then as a man of letters. He also worked as a book editor, and probably as a ghostwriter.

Leighton died on 24 December 1874.

== Works ==
The Tales of the Borders, a popular short story serial, was begun at Berwick-on-Tweed in 1834 by John Mackay Wilson, who died the following year. His brother continued the work for a time. Shortly afterwards an Edinburgh publisher, John Sutherland, became proprietor, and Leighton was appointed editor and chief story writer; the series was completed in 1840. In 1857 Leighton re-edited the complete Tales of the Borders, and it was reissued in 1863–4, 1869 (with additions), and in 1888. He received assistance from Hugh Miller and Thomas Gillespie, and contributions from others such as Alexander Bethune and his brother John, and John Howell.

In 1860–1 Leighton published two series of Curious Storied Traditions of Scottish Life, in 1864 Mysterious Legends of Edinburgh, in 1865 Shellburn, a novel, and in 1867 Romance of the Old Town of Edinburgh. Other works were Men and Women of History, Jephthah's Daughter, A Dictionary of Religions, and a Latin metrical version of Robert Burns's songs.
