= Alexander Bethune (poet) =

- Born: 7 January 1804; Scotland
- Died: 1843 (aged 38–39); Scotland
- Occupation: Scottish weaver-poet

Alexander Bethune (1804–1843) was a short-lived Scottish weaver-poet. Twice crippled by explosions, he was said to be very disfigured and looked "prematurely aged".

== Life ==
He was born on 7 January 1804 in a cottage on the estate of Upper (or Over) Rankeilour House in the parish of Monimail in central Fife. He was the eldest son of Alexander Bethune (d.1838), a farm labourer and weaver, and his wife Alison Christie (d.1840). He was the elder brother of John Bethune.

In 1813 the family moved to Lochend Farm near Lindores Loch in the parish of Abdie.

In 1822 he was employed alongside his brother breaking rocks to create a new toll road in Fife from Lindores to Newburgh. He returned again to labouring after his weaving venture collapsed in 1825. Mainly working in quarrying and road-building he was blown up in a quarry explosion in 1829 and not expected to live. He recovered and returned to the same line of work. Ironically an almost identical circumstance recurred in 1832 and he was left physically disfigured and crippled by the second explosion. He lost one eye and was temporarily blinded in the other. The man he was with was killed.

In 1830 he began writing poetry and was published in local newspapers in their "Poets Corner". In 1838 he went to Edinburgh and persuaded the publisher Andrew Shortrede who had a printworks on Thistle Street, to publish "Tales and Sketches of Scottish Poetry" which proved an instant success. However, Shortrede did the better of the two as he acquired the full copyright in exchange for the price of the first 50 copies sold (probably around 50 shillings).

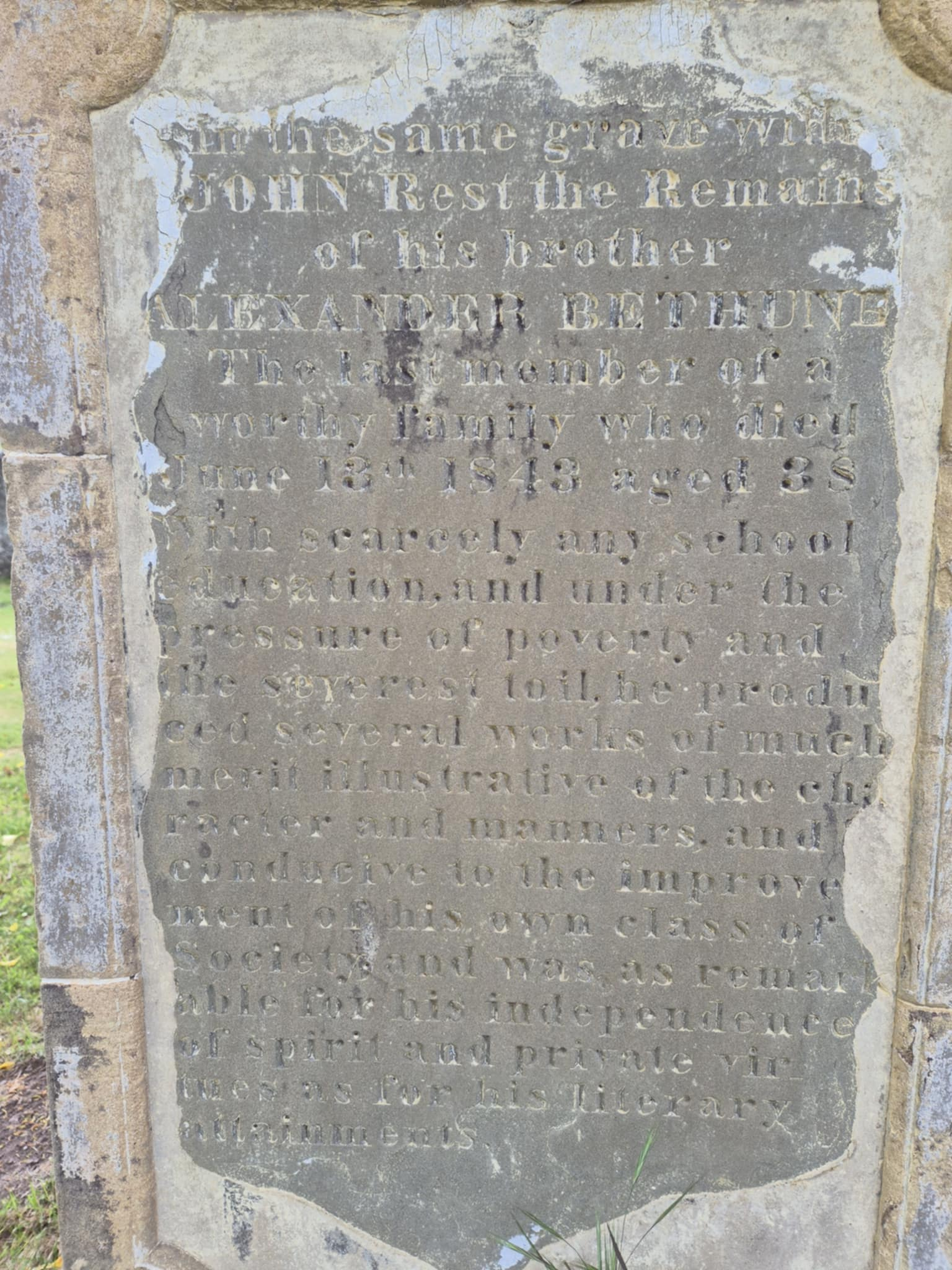
Photograph taken in Old Abdie Churchyard in May 2025

The family were forced to leave Lochend farm in 1839 following the death of his father. They moved slightly north to a cottage in Newburgh, Fife which is said to be built by the brothers (but this is unlikely as they needed accommodation immediately). The house is now called "Bethune Cottage". Given their financial position it is likely that (if they lived here at all) that it was in a single room. His mother died soon after the move. It is not clear if John died before or after the move. Alexander published John's poems just after his death and the sold the whole first issue of 750 copies within a few weeks.

A fan, Mrs Hill, wife of Frederick Hill, HM Inspector of Prisons, heard of his financial predicament and obtained him a job as a turnkey (prison warder) in Glasgow in 1840, but he despised the job and resigned in March 1841.

In 1842 he returned to Edinburgh to agree publishing rights of his next book, "The Scottish Peasants Fireside". He avoided Shortrede and instead asked Adam Black (later the Lord Provost) of Adam And Charles Black on 27 North Bridge to publish his work.

Early in 1843 he was offered the editorship of the newspaper the "Dumfries Standard" but did not live to take the post. He died of consumption (tuberculosis) (possibly contracted from John in 1839) on 13 June 1843 at Newburgh in Fife. He died before seeing the success of his final book, which proved popular with Scots in Canada. He was buried in Abdie parish churchyard.

== Publications ==
- "Tales of the Borders" contributor 1832 onwards under John Mackay Wilson
- "Tales and Sketches of the Scottish Peasantry" (1838) (with John)
- "Lectures on Practical Economy" (1839) (with John)
- "The Scottish Peasants Fireside" (1843)
