= List of listed buildings in Newburgh, Fife =

This is a list of listed buildings in the parish of Newburgh in Fife, Scotland.

== List ==
Name	Location	Date listed	Grid ref. (Note: Sometimes known as OSGB36, the grid reference (where provided) is based on the British national grid reference system used by the Ordnance Survey. • "Guide to National Grid". Ordnance Survey. • "Get-a-map". Ordnance Survey.)	Geo-coordinates	Notes	LB number (Note: Historic Environment Scotland assign a unique alphanumeric identifier to each designated site in Scotland, for listed buildings this always begins with "LB", for example "LB12345".)	Image
41 High Street				56°21′03″N 3°14′16″W	Category C(S)	38498	Upload Photo
The Bear Tavern, 47 High Street				56°21′03″N 3°14′17″W	Category C(S)	38500	Upload Photo
137 High Street				56°21′02″N 3°14′33″W	Category C(S)	38523	Upload Photo
187 High Street				56°21′01″N 3°14′40″W	Category C(S)	38536	Upload Photo
201 High Street				56°21′01″N 3°14′42″W	Category C(S)	38541	Upload Photo
239, 241 High Street				56°20′59″N 3°14′47″W	Category C(S)	38550	Upload Photo
Fountain Hotel, High Street				56°21′05″N 3°14′06″W	Category B	38551	Upload Photo
4-12 High Street				56°21′04″N 3°14′08″W	Category C(S)	38553	Upload Photo
26 High Street				56°21′04″N 3°14′11″W	Category C(S)	38557	Upload Photo
36-40 High Street				56°21′04″N 3°14′13″W	Category C(S)	38561	Upload Photo
50, 52 High Street				56°21′04″N 3°14′16″W	Category C(S)	38565	Upload Photo
58, 60 High Street				56°21′04″N 3°14′17″W	Category C(S)	38567	Upload Photo
186, 188 High				56°21′02″N 3°14′41″W	Category B	38586	Upload Photo
212 High Street				56°21′01″N 3°14′44″W	Category C(S)	38591	Upload Photo
Barns O' Woodside				56°20′58″N 3°14′13″W	Category B	38602	Upload Photo
Dunvegan (Former Manse)				56°20′59″N 3°14′01″W	Category C(S)	38484	Upload Photo
Mugdrum House, Offices And Coachman's House				56°21′04″N 3°15′06″W	Category C(S)	15562	Upload Photo
Pitcairlie House				56°19′16″N 3°13′58″W	Category A	15565	Upload Photo
Pitcairlie Ice House				56°19′15″N 3°14′02″W	Category C(S)	15566	Upload Photo
21 High Street				56°21′03″N 3°14′11″W	Category C(S)	38491	Upload Photo
83, 85 High Street				56°21′02″N 3°14′24″W	Category C(S)	38511	Upload Photo
3 Hill Road				56°21′02″N 3°14′29″W	Category C(S)	38520	Upload Photo
5 Hill Road				56°21′02″N 3°14′29″W	Category C(S)	38521	Upload Photo
149 High Street				56°21′02″N 3°14′35″W	Category C(S)	38525	Upload Photo
181 High Street				56°21′01″N 3°14′39″W	Category C(S)	38534	Upload Photo
183, 185 High Street				56°21′01″N 3°14′39″W	Category C(S)	38535	Upload Photo
195 High Street				56°21′01″N 3°14′41″W	Category C(S)	38539	Upload Photo
237 High Street				56°20′59″N 3°14′47″W	Category C(S)	38549	Upload Photo
George Hotel High Street				56°21′04″N 3°14′07″W	Category B	38552	Upload Photo
22, 24 High Street				56°21′04″N 3°14′10″W	Category C(S)	38556	Upload Photo
110-112 High Street				56°21′03″N 3°14′25″W	Category C(S)	38573	Upload Photo
140-142 High Street				56°21′03″N 3°14′33″W	Category C(S)	38576	Upload Photo
158, 160 High Street				56°21′03″N 3°14′37″W	Category C(S)	38580	Upload Photo
162, 164 High Street				56°21′03″N 3°14′38″W	Category C(S)	38581	Upload Photo
194, 196 High Street				56°21′02″N 3°14′43″W	Category C(S)	38588	Upload Photo
Parish Church Of Newburgh				56°21′04″N 3°13′53″W	Category C(S)	38482	Upload another image
1-3 High Street				56°21′03″N 3°14′08″W	Category B	38486	Upload Photo
61 High Street				56°21′03″N 3°14′19″W	Category C(S)	38504	Upload Photo
Wilkie's Garage At Rear Of 81 High Street				56°21′01″N 3°14′23″W	Category C(S)	38510	Upload Photo
87 High Street				56°21′02″N 3°14′24″W	Category C(S)	38512	Upload Photo
113 High Street				56°21′02″N 3°14′29″W	Category C(S)	38519	Upload Photo
155-159 High Street				56°21′02″N 3°14′36″W	Category C(S)	38527	Upload Photo
161 High Street				56°21′02″N 3°14′36″W	Category C(S)	38528	Upload Photo
165-173 High Street				56°21′02″N 3°14′37″W	Category B	38530	Upload Photo
175 High Street				56°21′02″N 3°14′37″W	Category C(S)	38531	Upload Photo
211, 213 High Street				56°21′01″N 3°14′43″W	Category C(S)	38544	Upload Photo
225, 227 High Street				56°21′00″N 3°14′45″W	Category C(S)	38546	Upload Photo
229 High Street				56°21′00″N 3°14′45″W	Category C(S)	38547	Upload Photo
48 High Street				56°21′04″N 3°14′15″W	Category C(S)	38564	Upload Photo
104-108 High Street				56°21′04″N 3°14′25″W	Category C(S)	38572	Upload Photo
Lindores Lodge, High Street				56°21′03″N 3°14′32″W	Category B	38575	Upload Photo
144-146 High Street				56°21′03″N 3°14′34″W	Category C(S)	38577	Upload Photo
166, 168 High Street				56°21′03″N 3°14′39″W	Category C(S)	38582	Upload Photo
190-2 High Street				56°21′02″N 3°14′42″W	Category C(S)	38587	Upload Photo
198-202 High Street				56°21′02″N 3°14′43″W	Category C(S)	38589	Upload Photo
9-13 High Street				56°21′03″N 3°14′09″W	Category C(S)	38488	Upload Photo
17 High Street				56°21′03″N 3°14′11″W	Category B	38489	Upload Photo
Mugdrum House				56°21′06″N 3°15′03″W	Category B	15561	Upload Photo
Lochmill Steading				56°19′59″N 3°15′05″W	Category C(S)	15563	Upload Photo
29 High Street				56°21′03″N 3°14′14″W	Category C(S)	38495	Upload Photo
Town House High Street				56°21′02″N 3°14′20″W	Category B	38506	Upload another image
81 High Street				56°21′02″N 3°14′23″W	Category B	38509	Upload Photo
National Commercial (Originally Commercial) Bank And Adjoining Buildings, 89-93 High Street				56°21′02″N 3°14′25″W	Category B	38513	Upload Photo
97 High Street				56°21′02″N 3°14′26″W	Category C(S)	38515	Upload Photo
153 And 151 High Street Including Ancillary Structures And Boundary Walls				56°21′02″N 3°14′35″W	Category C(S)	38526	Upload Photo
177 High Street				56°21′02″N 3°14′38″W	Category C(S)	38532	Upload Photo
193 High Street				56°21′01″N 3°14′40″W	Category C(S)	38538	Upload Photo
197-9 High Street				56°21′01″N 3°14′41″W	Category C(S)	38540	Upload Photo
215-219 High Street				56°21′00″N 3°14′43″W	Category C(S)	38545	Upload Photo
34 High Street				56°21′04″N 3°14′13″W	Category C(S)	38560	Upload Photo
42 High Street				56°21′04″N 3°14′14″W	Category B	38562	Upload Photo
44, 46 High Street				56°21′04″N 3°14′15″W	Category C(S)	38563	Upload Photo
54, 56 High Street				56°21′04″N 3°14′17″W	Category C(S)	38566	Upload Photo
226-230 High Street				56°21′00″N 3°14′47″W	Category C(S)	38592	Upload Photo
4 Shuttlefield				56°21′00″N 3°14′49″W	Category C(S)	38596	Upload Photo
Taybank				56°21′01″N 3°13′59″W	Category B	38483	Upload Photo
Former Office Block, Now Sawmill, (Eastern Building) Pitcairlie				56°19′14″N 3°14′03″W	Category B	15567	Upload Photo
35-39 High Street				56°21′03″N 3°14′15″W	Category B	38497	Upload Photo
43, 45 High Street				56°21′03″N 3°14′17″W	Category C(S)	38499	Upload Photo
69, 71 High Street				56°21′03″N 3°14′21″W	Category B	38508	Upload Photo
141, 143 High Street				56°21′02″N 3°14′34″W	Category C(S)	38524	Upload Photo
32 High Street				56°21′04″N 3°14′12″W	Category C(S)	38559	Upload Photo
60A And 62 High Street				56°21′04″N 3°14′18″W	Category C(S)	38568	Upload Photo
64, 68 High Street				56°21′03″N 3°14′18″W	Category C(S)	38569	Upload Photo
128-136 High Street				56°21′03″N 3°14′31″W	Category C(S)	38574	Upload Photo
3 Shuttlefield				56°21′00″N 3°14′49″W	Category C(S)	38595	Upload Photo
5 Shuttlefield				56°21′00″N 3°14′50″W	Category C(S)	38597	Upload Photo
11 Shuttlefield				56°21′01″N 3°14′52″W	Category C(S)	38600	Upload Photo
23 High Street				56°21′03″N 3°14′12″W	Category C(S)	38492	Upload Photo
25 High Street				56°21′03″N 3°14′12″W	Category C(S)	38493	Upload Photo
31, 33 High Street				56°21′03″N 3°14′14″W	Category C(S)	38496	Upload Photo
65 High Street				56°21′02″N 3°14′20″W	Category C(S)	38505	Upload Photo
179 High Street				56°21′02″N 3°14′38″W	Category C(S)	38533	Upload Photo
189, 191 High Street				56°21′01″N 3°14′40″W	Category C(S)	38537	Upload Photo
231-235 High Street				56°21′00″N 3°14′46″W	Category C(S)	38548	Upload Photo
14 High Street				56°21′04″N 3°14′09″W	Category C(S)	38554	Upload Photo
28, 30 High Street				56°21′04″N 3°14′11″W	Category C(S)	38558	Upload Photo
70 High Street				56°21′04″N 3°14′19″W	Category C(S)	38570	Upload Photo
180, 182 High Street				56°21′02″N 3°14′41″W	Category C(S)	38585	Upload Photo
Criterion House Cornhill Street				56°21′06″N 3°14′23″W	Category B	38601	Upload Photo
Monkswell Cottage				56°20′53″N 3°14′09″W	Category C(S)	38603	Upload Photo
Pitcairlie Lodge And Gatepiers				56°19′29″N 3°13′49″W	Category B	15564	Upload Photo
27 High Street, (Excluding 3 Ruinous Houses At Rear)				56°21′03″N 3°14′13″W	Category C(S)	38494	Upload Photo
53 High Street (Cottages Now Stores At Back Excluded)				56°21′03″N 3°14′18″W	Category C(S)	38502	Upload Photo
57, 59 High Street				56°21′03″N 3°14′19″W	Category C(S)	38503	Upload Photo
Craigview, Off High Street				56°21′01″N 3°14′20″W	Category B	38507	Upload Photo
103-107 High Street, Albert Bar				56°21′02″N 3°14′28″W	Category C(S)	38517	Upload Photo
135 High Street				56°21′02″N 3°14′33″W	Category C(S)	38522	Upload Photo
205 High Street				56°21′01″N 3°14′43″W	Category C(S)	38542	Upload Photo
207, 209 High Street				56°21′01″N 3°14′43″W	Category C(S)	38543	Upload Photo
20 High Street				56°21′04″N 3°14′10″W	Category C(S)	38555	Upload Photo
154 High Street				56°21′03″N 3°14′36″W	Category C(S)	38578	Upload Photo
156 High Street				56°21′03″N 3°14′37″W	Category C(S)	38579	Upload Photo
170-174 High Street				56°21′02″N 3°14′39″W	Category C(S)	38583	Upload Photo
178 High Street				56°21′02″N 3°14′40″W	Category C(S)	38584	Upload Photo
206 High Street				56°21′01″N 3°14′44″W	Category C(S)	38590	Upload Photo
Tay View Hotel, High Street				56°21′00″N 3°14′47″W	Category C(S)	38593	Upload Photo
9 Shuttlefield				56°21′00″N 3°14′51″W	Category C(S)	38599	Upload Photo
Bethunes' Cottage				56°20′51″N 3°14′11″W	Category B	38604	Upload Photo
49-51 High Street				56°21′03″N 3°14′18″W	Category C(S)	38501	Upload Photo
95 High Street				56°21′02″N 3°14′26″W	Category C(S)	38514	Upload Photo
99, 101 High Street				56°21′02″N 3°14′27″W	Category C(S)	38516	Upload Photo
109 High Street				56°21′02″N 3°14′28″W	Category C(S)	38518	Upload Photo
Mcnaughton, 165 High Street				56°21′01″N 3°14′36″W	Category C(S)	38529	Upload Photo
72 High Street				56°21′03″N 3°14′19″W	Category C(S)	38571	Upload Photo
Tay Bridge Hotel, Clinton Street				56°20′58″N 3°14′49″W	Category B	38594	Upload Photo
Helendale, Shuttlefield				56°21′00″N 3°14′50″W	Category C(S)	38598	Upload Photo
Abbey House				56°21′08″N 3°13′34″W	Category B	38481	Upload Photo
Guthrie Lodge				56°21′01″N 3°14′04″W	Category B	38485	Upload Photo
5-7 High Street				56°21′03″N 3°14′09″W	Category C(S)	38487	Upload Photo
19 High Street				56°21′03″N 3°14′11″W	Category C(S)	38490	Upload Photo

== Key ==
The scheme for classifying buildings in Scotland is:

- Category A: "buildings of national or international importance, either architectural or historic; or fine, little-altered examples of some particular period, style or building type."
- Category B: "buildings of regional or more than local importance; or major examples of some particular period, style or building type, which may have been altered."
- Category C: "buildings of local importance; lesser examples of any period, style, or building type, as originally constructed or moderately altered; and simple traditional buildings which group well with other listed buildings."

In March 2016 there were 47,288 listed buildings in Scotland. Of these, 8% were Category A, and 50% were Category B, with the remaining 42% being Category C.

== See also ==
- List of listed buildings in Fife
