= Lindores (E&NR) railway station =

Temporary railway station in Lindores, Fife

Coordinates: 56.336161°N 3.201067°W

Lindores (E&NR)

General information
- Location: Lindores, Fife; Scotland

Other information
- Status: Disused

History
- Original company: Edinburgh and Northern Railway

Key dates
- 20 September 1847: Opened
- 9 December 1847: Closed
Location

Lindores (E&NR) railway station was a temporary terminus that served the village of Lindores, Fife, Scotland in 1847 on the Edinburgh and Northern Railway.

== History ==
The station opened on 20 September 1847 by the Edinburgh and Northern Railway as a temporary terminus from Ladybank. It was also known as Abdie due to Abdie Church being close by. The station closed when the line was extended to Hilton Junction on 9 December 1847.
