= Andrew Balfour (botanist) =

British doctor and botanist

- Born: 18 January 1630
- Died: 10 January 1694 (aged 63)
- Education: University of St Andrews
- Relatives: Sir James Balfour, 1st Baronet
- Medical career
- Profession: physician, botanist
- Sub-specialties: botanic medicine
- Research: botany, medicine

Sir Andrew Balfour (18 January 1630 – 9 or 10 January 1694) was a Scottish medical doctor, botanist, antiquary and book collector, the youngest brother of the antiquarian Sir James Balfour, 1st Baronet.

== Life ==
Andrew Balfour was born on 18 January 1630, the son of Sir Michael Balfour of Denmilne, Fife, and Joanna Durham.

Balfour received his early education at the parish school of Abdie, before studying at the University of St. Andrews, where he studied philosophy and arithmetic under Thomas Glegg and graduated with an MA in 1650. Balfour's oldest brother, Sir James Balfour, encouraged him to collect literary, antiquarian and natural history objects. He moved to London and in 1650 became a pupil to John Wedderburn, the King's physician. After London, Balfour travelled to France in 1657 where he studied medicine in Paris and at the University of Caen. Balfour obtained a degree with a dissertation entitled De Venae Sectione in Dysenteria. Returning to London, he became a governor end of 1661 to John Wilmot, 2nd Earl of Rochester, travelling to France and Italy with him from end of 1661 to 1664.

In 1667, Balfour set up medical practice in St Andrews. By this time, he had amassed a large collection of scientific and medical books, curiosities and instruments: his 'rarities' were called the 'Museaum Balfourianum' by contemporaries. In 1670, he moved to set up practice in Edinburgh. He planted a small botanical garden next to his house. Balfour's cousin was Robert Sibbald, whom he succeeded as third president of the Royal College of Physicians of Edinburgh in 1684. Balfour and Sibbald set up a garden together near Trinity College Church, on ground allocated by the city magistrates, which Balfour subsequently persuaded the university to fund. Balfour and Sibbald were also key figures in the creation of the Edinburgh Pharmacopoeia. Sutherland's catalogue of 1684 indicates that the garden had about 2,000 non-indigenous species.

In the spring of 1689, for certain strategic military reasons, the Nor Loch which lay west of the Physic Garden was drained, resulting in the flooding of the garden, with much mud and general rubbish being deposited, to the ruination of many of the plants.

After Balfour's death, his library was sold, with a printed catalogue listing 3,501 items. Travel advice to Patrick Murray, Laird of Livingstone (who had died on European tour in 1671) was subsequently published as Letters to a Friend (1700).

== Works ==
- Letters written to a Friend by the learned and judicious Sir Andrew Balfour, M.D. containing excellent direction and advices for travelling thro' France and Italy, 1700
