= Abdie stone =

Pictish stone in Fife, Scotland

Coordinates: 56.3365°N 3.20380°W

The Abdie Stone
- Size: 1.7 metres (5 ft 7 in)
- Symbols: Triple disc; Crescent and v-rod
- Created: Sixth-Eighth Century CE
- Place: Abdie Churchyard, near Lindores, Fife, Scotland
- Classification: Class I incised stone
- Culture: Picto-Scottish

The Abdie stone is a Class I Pictish stone that stands in Abdie Churchyard, Lindores, Fife, Scotland.

== Location ==
The stone originally stood on the crest of Kaim Hill. It was removed and incorporated in a garden wall in Grange of Lindores before being moved to the Morthouse of Abdie Church.

== Description ==
The stone is 1.7 metres (5 ft 7 in) high, 0.56 metres (1 ft 10 in) wide. It bears incised Pictish symbols on two faces, a Triple disc and crescent and v rod on one and a Mirror on another.
