= Newfarm Loch =

New Farm Loch
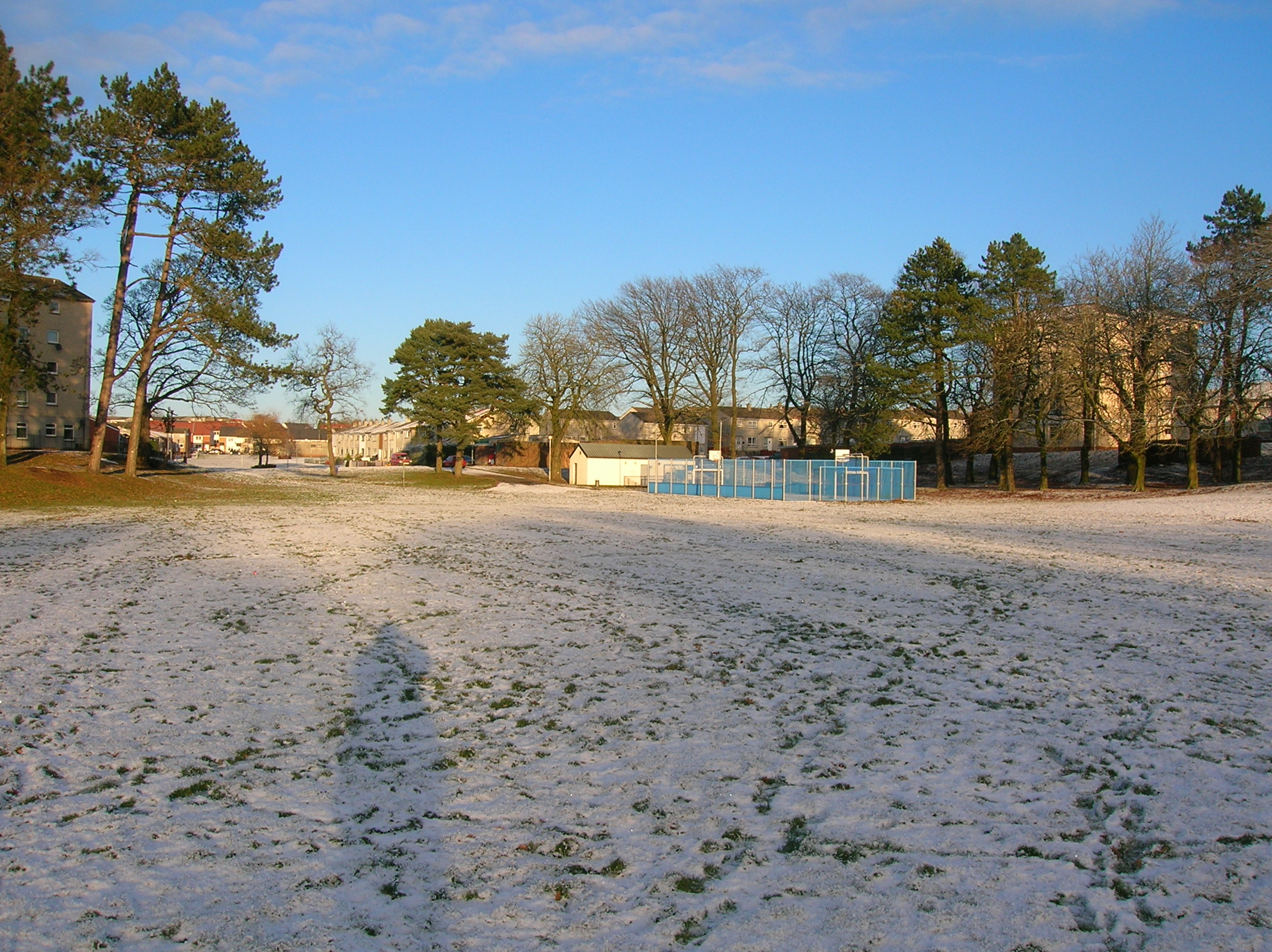
- Looking North-East at the site of the Newfarm Loch

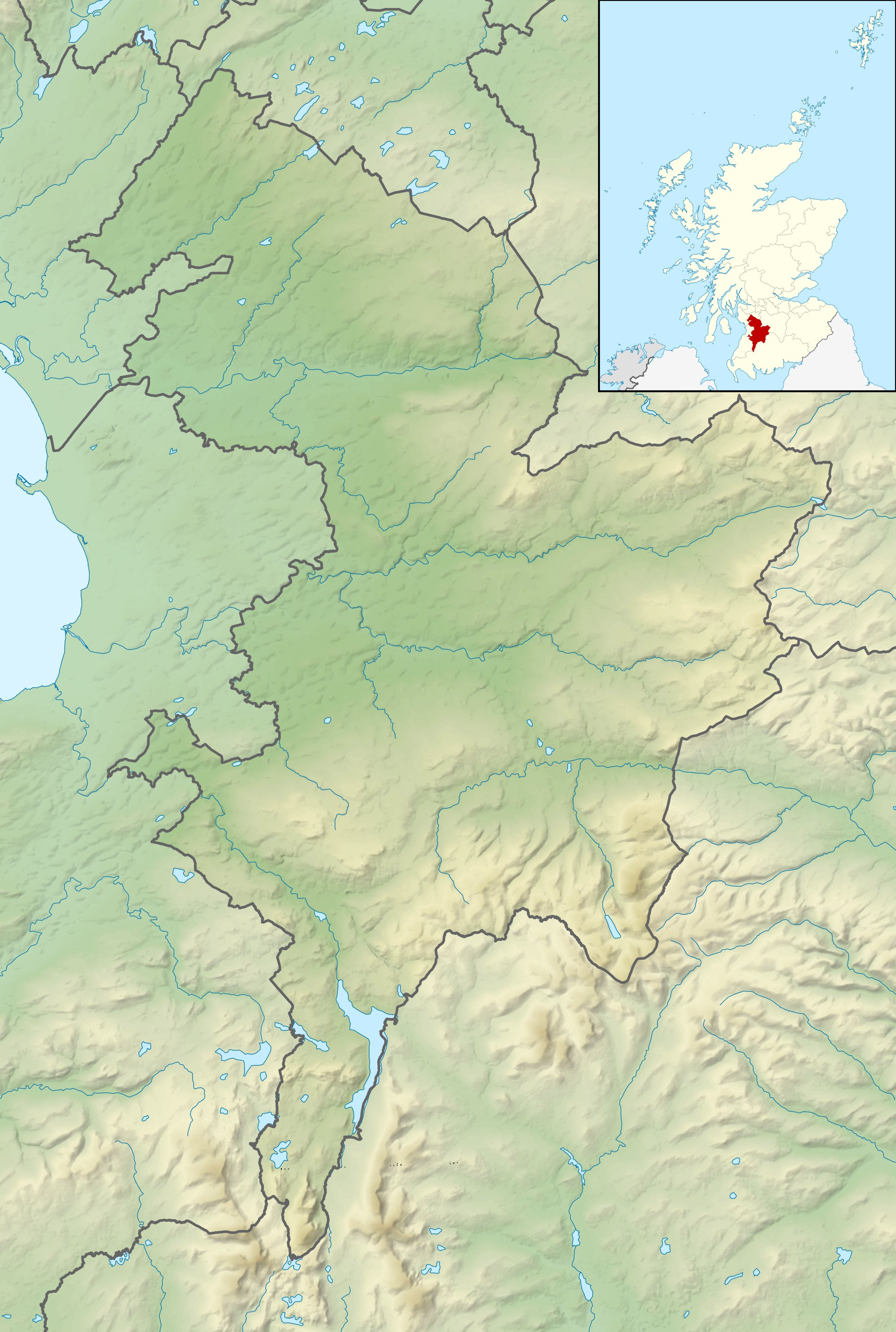
- Location within East Ayrshire
- Location: Kilmarnock, East Ayrshire, Scotland
- Coordinates: 55°37′01″N 4°28′23″W
- Type: Drained freshwater loch
- Primary inflows: Hillhouse Burn and runoff
- Primary outflows: Holehouse Burn
- Basin countries: Scotland
- Max. length: 300 m (980 ft)
- Max. width: 150 m (490 ft)
- Surface area: 0.33 ha (0.82 acres)
- Average depth: Circa 1 m (3.3 ft)
- Max. depth: Circa 1.5 m (4.9 ft)
- Settlements: Kilmarnock

New Farm Loch was situated in a low-lying area between the farms of Holehouse and New Farm in the Parish of Kilmarnock, New Farm Loch, East Ayrshire in Scotland. The loch was mostly artificial, having been developed as a curling pond, fed by the Hillhouse Burn through seasonal flooding. The loch was drained via Holehouse Farm Burn.

== History ==
=== Origins ===
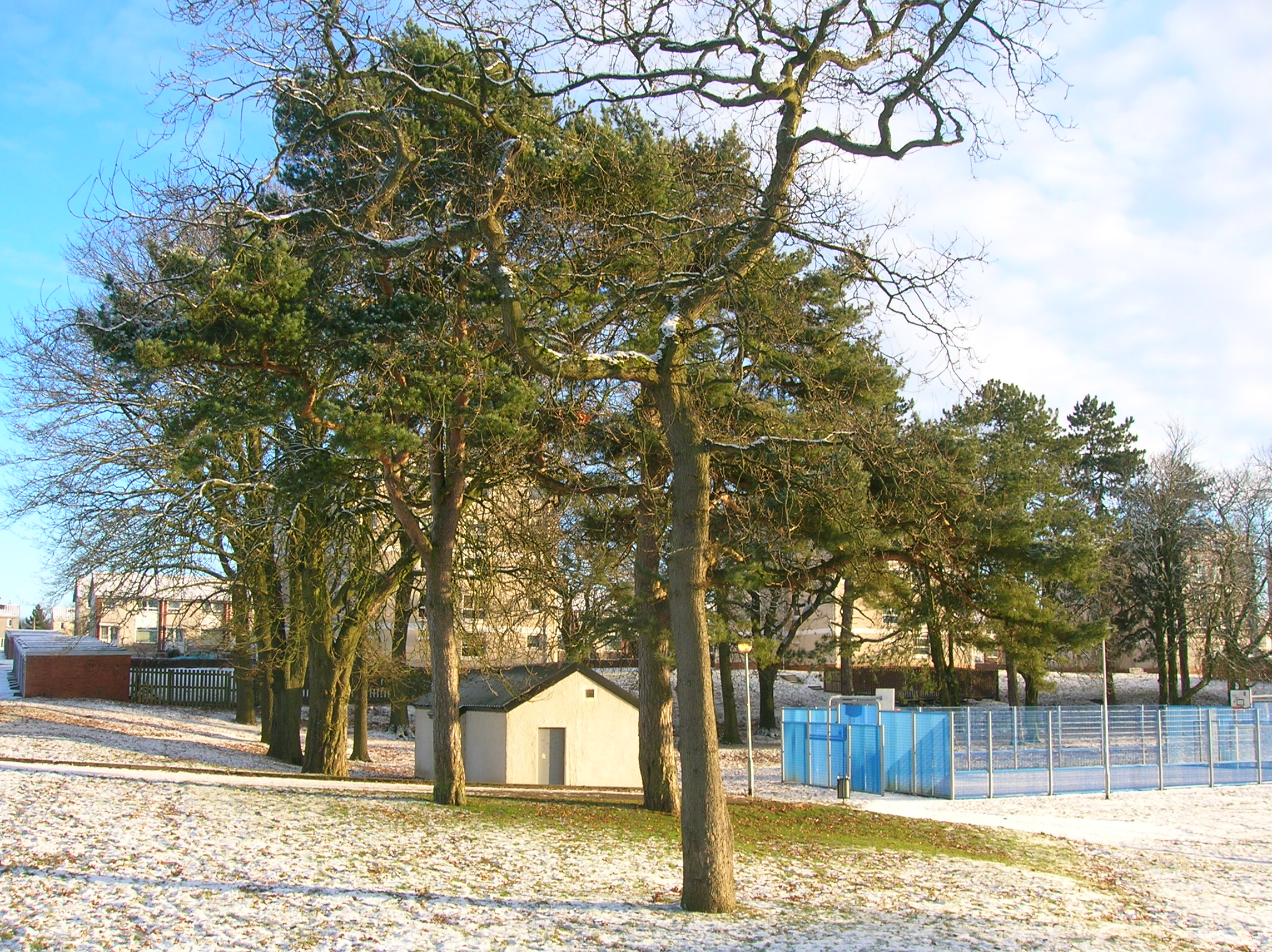
Northern end of the old loch and curling venue.

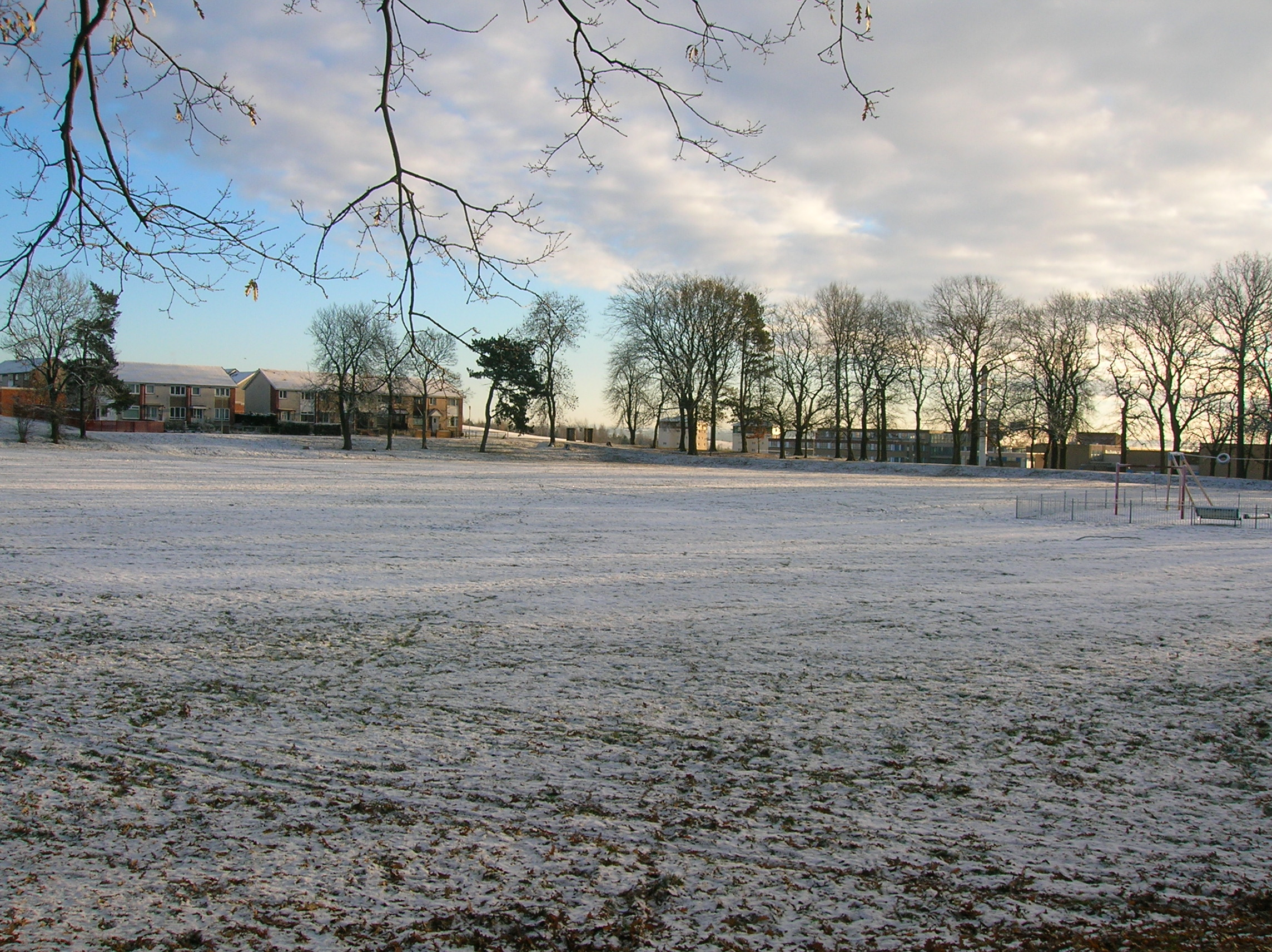
Newfarm Loch looking south-east.

This curling loch, covering approximately 0.33 ha and around 2 feet deep, was established by co-operation between the Duke of Portland's factor and the local curling clubs in 1845; the site was prone to seasonal flooding from the Hillhouse Burn and being shallow it froze over quickly and was relatively safe. A match is recorded from as early as 1843. Newfarm Loch, which was once popular as a curling rink, was rented by several curling clubs, also used by ice skaters. Photographs circa 1900 shows a stone built pavilion or curling house at the site with a long wooden canopy and the 1938 Ordnance Survey map shows two pavilions situated on the loch banks either side of the access from Newfarm Loch.

=== Decline ===
By 1957 the pavilions and curling storage buildings had disappeared and the loch is marked as disused. In 1957/8 a local from New Farm recorded that the fields around the loch were littered with curling stones and the loch itself, although drained, was still very visible; an oblong shape totally surrounded by trees with the drainage apparatus at the end and a sawmill on the edge nearest to New Farm. The Dick Institute in Kilmarnock holds oil paintings and photographs of curlers on New Farm Loch. One, by local artist Alexander MacKay, shows a late afternoon view, there are crowds out on the ice, with a wide range of townsfolk. Several games of curling underway but some are entertaining themselves by pushing others over. This partly artificial loch provided ice for curling and skating for over 100 years. In the early days of the new scheme the loch was used as a site for grand fetes.

=== Present day ===
The loch site is still bordered by mature trees planted to provide shelter for the curlers. It has not been built on, apart from a sports facility and children's swings, etc. It is however surrounded on three sides by houses and apartments built between 1968 and the mid-1970s. New Farm itself no longer exists; it stood about one field's distance away from the loch.

Remains of the old sluice are visible close to the old overflow. An extensive drainage system now prevents the loch from becoming marshy ground or filling again. The drainage ditch ran from the southern end towards Holehouse Farm where it joined the Hillhouse Burn, running into the New Mill Burn, eventually emptying into the River Irvine.

The village has numerous shops and businesses, one of which is local convenience store KeyStore.

== Micro-history ==
The other curling pond in the Kilmarnock area was situated in the grounds of the Craufurdland Estate.

== See also ==
- New Farm Loch
