= John Bethune (poet) =

Scottish poet

John Bethune (1812–1839) was a short-lived Scottish weaver-poet. He sometimes wrote under the pen-name of the Fifeshire Forester.

== Life ==
He was born in 1812 in a cottage on the estate of Upper (or Over) Rankeilour House (previously known as The Mount) in the parish of Monimail in central Fife. He was the son of Alexander Bethune (d.1838), a farm labourer and weaver, and his wife Alison Christie. He was the younger brother of Alexander Bethune.

In 1813, the family moved to Mains of Woodmill for a few months and then to nearby Lochend Farm near Lindores Loch in the parish of Abdie. He had no school education but was taught to read and write by his mother. His brother Alexander taught him arithmetic.

Around 1822, he was apprenticed as a weaver in Collessie. He was successful at this and in 1825 set up at least two handlooms in buildings adjoining his father's cottage. However, the timing of this was unfortunate as the handloom industry was soon devastated by the widespread use of power-looms.

In 1822, he was employed alongside his brother breaking rocks to create a new toll road in Fife from Lindores to Newburgh. He returned again to labouring after his weaving venture collapsed.

From 1829, he worked as a labourer at Inchture estate near Perth and was promoted to overseer in 1835. He lost this job in 1838 when the estate was sold. He never regained employment and thereafter tried to make a living as a writer.

Bethune died of consumption (tuberculosis) on 1 September 1839. His fame was almost entirely posthumous and largely brought about by the efforts of his brother. Bethune was buried in Abdie parish churchyard. [[

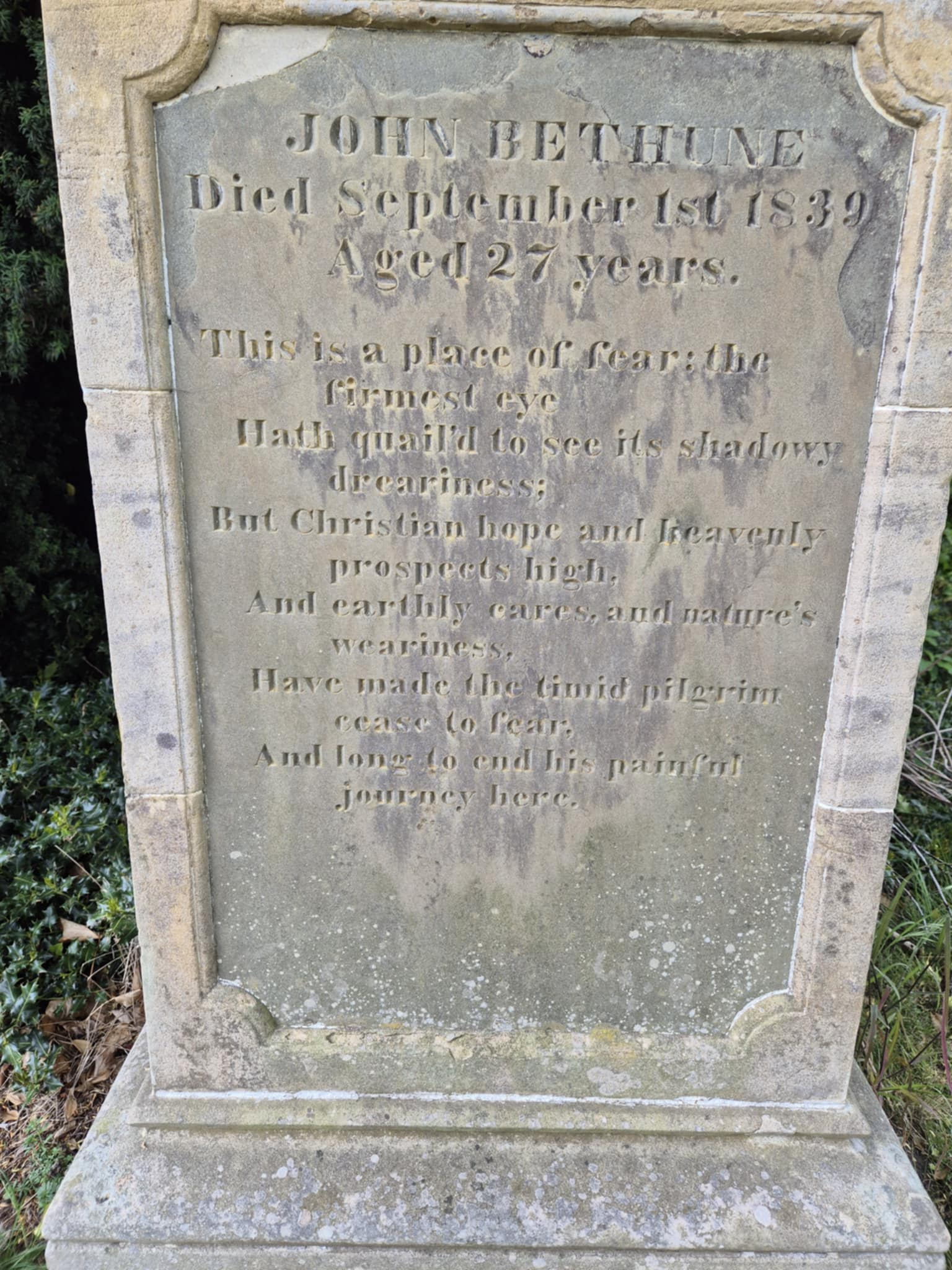
Taken in Abdie Old Churchyard, Fife in May 2025

|thumb]]

== Publications ==
- "Tales and Sketches of the Scottish Peasantry" (1838) (with Alexander)
- "Lectures on Practical Economy" (1839) (with Alexander)
- "Poems by the Late John Bethune" (1841) posthumous publishing
