= Carpow Roman Fort =

- "Horrea Classis" or "Poreo Classis"
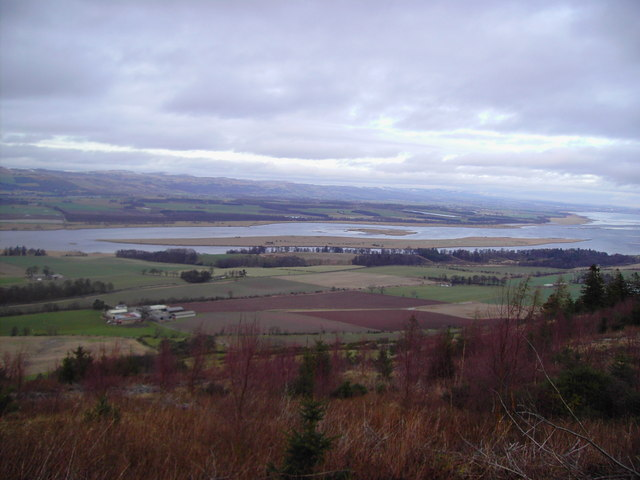
- The Tay estuary showing the area around the Roman Fort

- Scotland showing the site
- 56°20′48.3454″N 003°17′03.9177″W
- Type: Roman Fort
- Periods: Romano-British
- Cultures: Roman
- Satellite of: Ancient Rome
- Associated with: Legio II Augusta, Legio VI Victrix
- Region: Perth and Kinross

History
- Built: AD 210
- Built by: Legio II Augusta, Legio VI Victrix
- Abandoned: AD215

Site notes
- Area: 11 hectares (27 acres)
- Excavation dates: 1961-1979
- Archaeologists: D R Easson, P R Wright, J Leach and J Wilkes
- Condition: Upstanding scarp to 1.6m
- Website: canmore.rcahms.gov.uk/en/site/30081/details/carpow/

The Roman Fort of Carpow was situated at the confluence of the rivers Tay and Earn in what is now Scotland.

It was a large fortress with an area of thirty acres occupied by two legions at different times, Legio II Augusta and Legio VI Victrix, and thus of solid, permanent construction using stone, brick and tiles.

The fort was occupied from the late second century AD until the early third century AD. The site of the fort has not been comprehensively excavated but it is believed to have served as a naval supply depot for Roman forces in the central lowlands. Its occupation also coincided with the campaigns of Septimius Severus in the area.

However, its site on the southern side of the Tay estuary is incompatible with its use as a base for Severan offensive operations to the north and, along with other evidence, it is more likely that the fortress was built under Commodus in 185 to support his campaigns.

It has been suggested that the Carpow fort was the place named as "Horrea Classis" or "Poreo Classis" in the Ravenna Cosmography.

== Location ==
The Carpow fort was situated on a coastal plain on the southern bank of the river Tay approximately one kilometre east of the Tay's confluence with the River Earn. The Firth of Tay lay eastward of the fort and provided access to the North Sea.

Prior to the era of the fort's occupation, the Gask Ridge system of limes lay to the north and west. During the era of the fort's occupation, the Antonine Wall lay to the south and the vicinity was inhabited by the people referred to in Roman sources as either Caledonians or Caledones. In subsequent decades the Romans would refer to the local people as Picts. The significant Pictish site of Clatchard Craig lay to the immediate east of the Carpow fort.

== Description of the Modern Site ==
Modern Carpow is a rural hamlet, consisting of several residences, immediately eastward of the mouth of the river Earn. The fort is partially obscured by these buildings and its only visible remnant is its northern rampart. This survives as a ridge of approximately 1.6m height.

Other structures can be discerned by crop marks. They include the full quadrilateral outline of the fort's ramparts and the remains of a building which seems to have been a typical Roman military headquarters known as a "principia".

== Archeological Excavations ==
Archeological excavations were conducted at the site of the Carpow fort between 1964 and 1979. These excavations discovered numismatic evidence which suggested that the fort was occupied between the late second century AD and the early third century AD. The earliest coin found was heavily worn and dated to the rule of Hadrian. The latest coin found was in mint condition and dated to the reign of Caracalla.

The excavations also identified a Principia, a Praetorium, a bath house and a granary. Inscriptions of the Legio II Augusta and the Legio VI Victrix were found on fragments of masonry and on a rooftile, respectively.

== Identification with Horrea Classis ==
The Ravenna Cosmography, a Byzantine geographical text compiled in Ravenna during the eighth century AD, names a site called either "Horrea Classis" or "Poreo Classis", which seems to have been located in the east lowlands of Scotland.

"Poreo Classis" makes no obvious sense and so seems to represent a scribal error, although it might have been a Latinised version of a pre-existing Brittonic place name which might better explain the modern name element "Pow". "Horrea Classis", however, may be translated from Latin as "Naval Storehouses".

Several commentators have postulated that the Carpow fort, with its maritime setting and large granary, was "Horrea Classis".
