= Ninian Imrie =

Scottish army officer and geologist

- Citizenship: Scottish
- Occupation: Geologist

Lieutenant-colonel Ninian Imrie of Denmuir FRSE (died 1820) was a Scottish army officer and geologist. He gave the first wholly geological description of the Rock of Gibraltar. He stirred the Plutonist versus Neptunist debate during the Scottish Enlightenment.

== Early life ==
His family owned an estate known as Denmuir, near Abdie in Fife. He is thought to be born around 1750.

He was commissioned as an ensign in 1768, the commission being purchased by a Stephen Gually. He became lieutenant in 1772 and captain in 1777. Imrie served in the Second Regiment of Foot (later renamed the Royal Scots) in Gibraltar from 1784 to 1793. Here he rose to be aide-de-camp for Lt General John Gordon Cuming Skene. During this period he is known to have corresponded with James Hutton in Edinburgh. He was promoted to lieutenant colonel in 1798. In the same year he was elected a Fellow of the Royal Society of Edinburgh. His proposers were John Walker, Alexander Keith and John Playfair.

He retired on half pay in 1799. He was living permanently in Edinburgh from around 1805 at 63 Queen Street. He died at 63 Queen Street in Edinburgh's First New Town on 13 November 1820.

== Publications ==
- The Geology of the Rock of Gibraltar (1798)
- A Catalogue of Specimens Illustrative of the Geology of Greece (1817)
