= Newburgh Town House =

Municipal building in Newburgh, Scotland

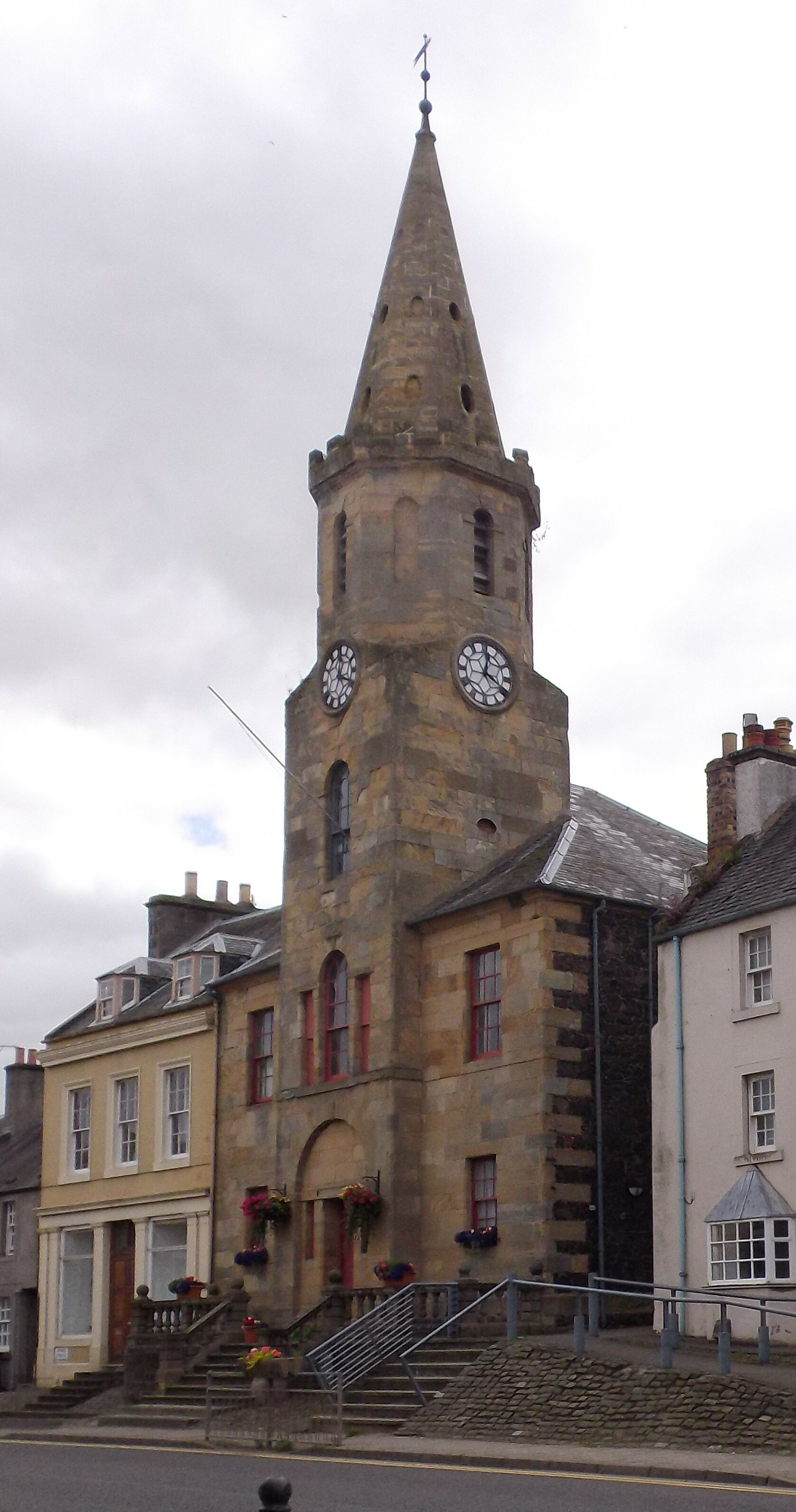
- Newburgh Town House

- Shown in Fife
- 56.0718°N 3.1739°W
- Location: High Street, Newburgh

History
- Built: 1810

Site notes
- Architect: John Speed
- Architectural style: Italianate style

Listed Building – Category B
- Official name: Town House, High Street
- Designated: 27 June 1973
- Reference no.: LB38506

Newburgh Town House is a municipal building in the High Street in Newburgh, Fife, Scotland. The structure, which is used as a series of artists' studios, is a Category B listed building.

== History ==
The first municipal building in Newburgh was a tolbooth dating back to the mid-16th century. By the late 18th century, it was dilapidated and the burgh leaders decided to petition the Secretary of State for War, Henry Dundas, whose seat was at Melville Castle, for his support to finance a new building. The site they selected in the High Street was occupied by a block of tenement houses.

Construction work on the new building started in 1808. It was designed by a local mason, John Speed, built in ashlar stone, and was completed in 1810. The design involved a symmetrical main frontage of three bays facing onto the High Street. The central bay, which was slightly projected forward, was formed by a four-stage tower; there was a square headed doorway enclosed in a round-headed arch in the first stage, a Venetian window surmounted by a date stone in the second stage, a round headed window surmounted by a clock face in the third stage and an octagonal belfry with alternating louvres and blind niches in the fourth stage. The tower was surmounted by a crenelated parapet, a spire and a weather vane. The outer bays were fenestrated by sash windows on both floors. Internally, the principal room was the council chamber, which lay across the rear of the building on the first floor.

Two prison cells at the rear of the building on the ground floor were converted into a corn exchange in 1830. A bell, cast at the London foundry of Mears and Stainbank, was installed in the belfry in 1859 and a new flight of entrance steps, flanked by wrought iron balustrades, was added to the front of the building in 1888.

A new municipal building, referred to as Newburgh Town Hall, was erected with financial support of a businessman from Musselburgh, John Livingstone, on a site just to the west of the town house in 1888, (Note: The town hall was largely used as a venue for theatre performances and concerts. Following local government reorganisation in 1975, it was demolished and the site redeveloped as Tolbooth Close in 1981.) and a library building, named the Laing Library, was erected with financial support from a local bank agent, Alexander Laing, on a site on the north side of the High Street, 100 yards (91 m) to the west of the town house, in 1896. (Note: The library, at 120 High Street, was later referred to as the "council offices" and accommodated the offices of the town clerk and other council officers. It subsequently accommodated a local history museum on the ground floor and the offices of the Fife Cultural Trust on the first floor.)

The town house continued to serve as the meeting place of the burgh council for much of the 20th century, but ceased to be the local seat of government after the enlarged North-East Fife District Council was formed in 1975. A major programme of refurbishment works, involving the conversion of the town house into artists' studios with exhibition and performance space, was carried out by Wasps Studios and completed in 2008: the complex was re-branded as "The Steeple".

== See also ==
- List of listed buildings in Newburgh, Fife
