= Curling house =

Building for storing curling equipment

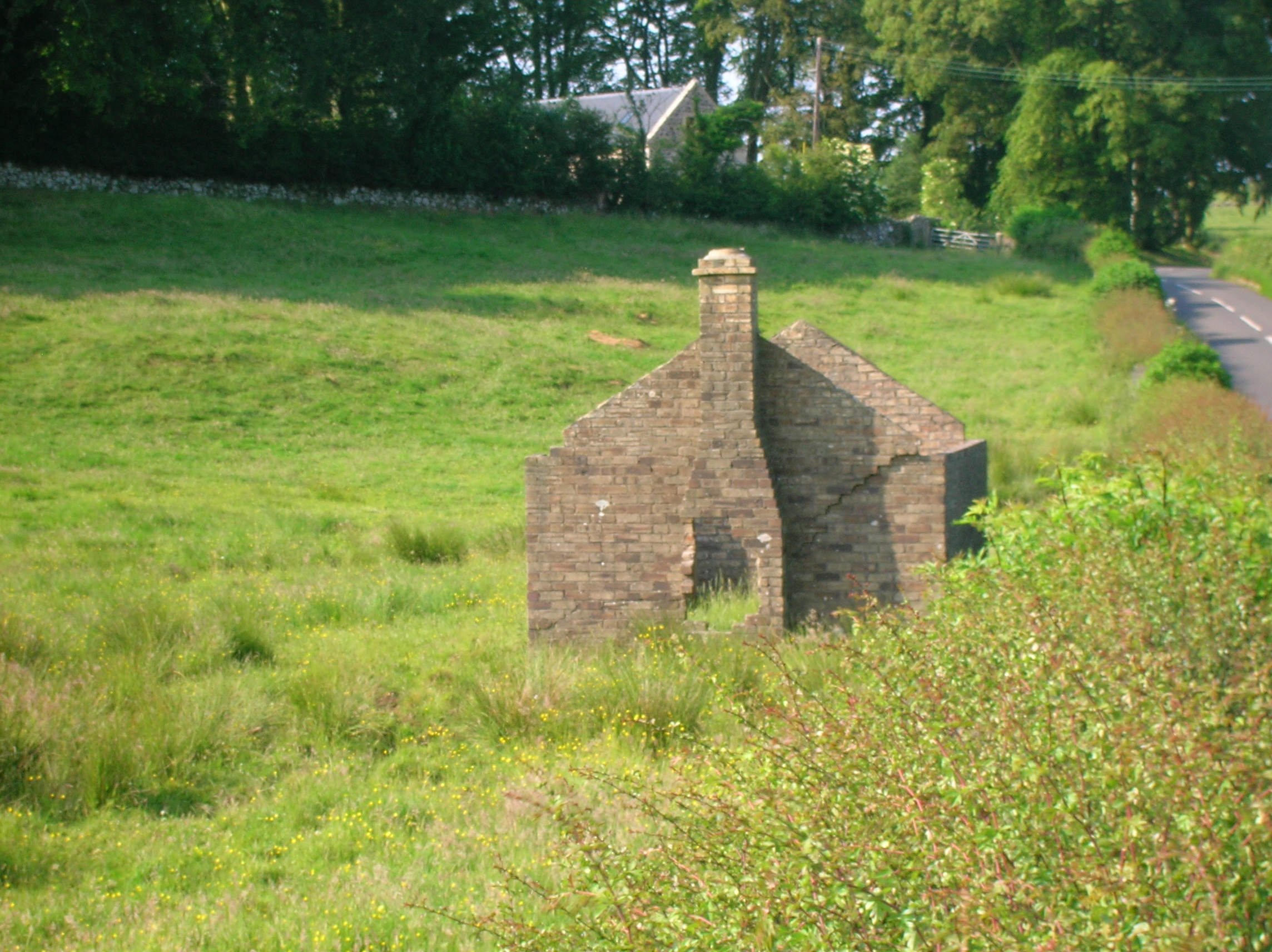
The old curling house at Craigie in South Ayrshire.

A curling house was used to store curling stones, brushes and other equipment used to maintain a curling pond and play the game of curling in Scotland and elsewhere.

== Introduction ==
The houses were often purely functional in character, being relatively small and often located in quite isolated places. Some curling houses were built as part of country estates and were much grander in appearance. A fireplace was sometimes present and this ensured some welcome heat for players, night watchmen, etc. The construction was of stone, brick or wood as shown by paintings or surviving examples.

== Purpose ==
Curling stones are heavy objects, and in the days of horse transport and poor quality roads it would be easier to store stones at the site of the curling pond. Additionally the ponds needed a certain degree of maintenance to the water supply, dam, weed control, etc. Tools could be stored in the house. Sometimes a watchman was employed during the season to make sure that all was well with the pond, its ice and the curling equipment. Refreshments would be provided, such as the seemingly traditional pies and porter mentioned as being served at the Eglinton flushes.

== Scottish curling houses ==
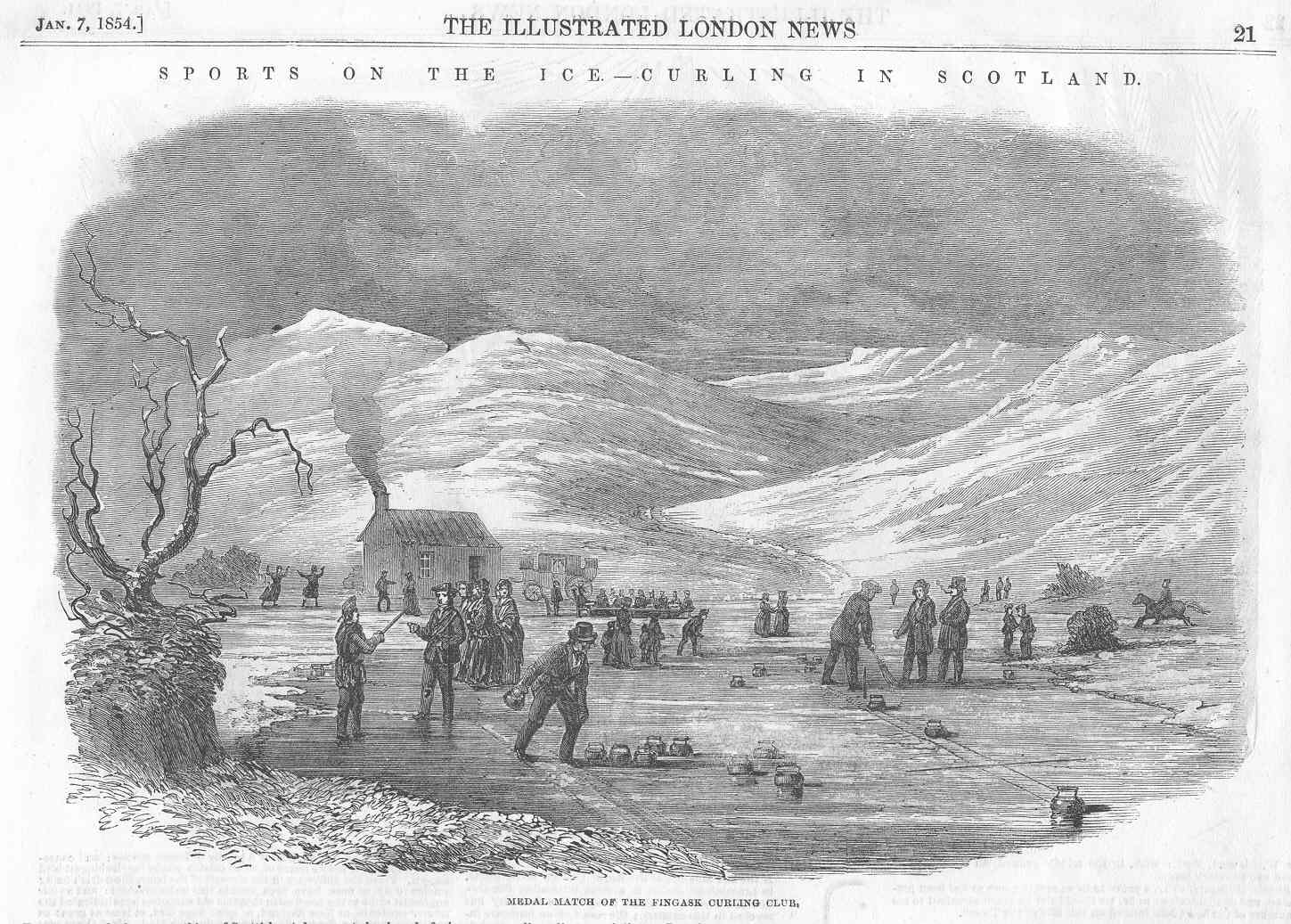
A Curling House at Fingask Castle, Perthshire

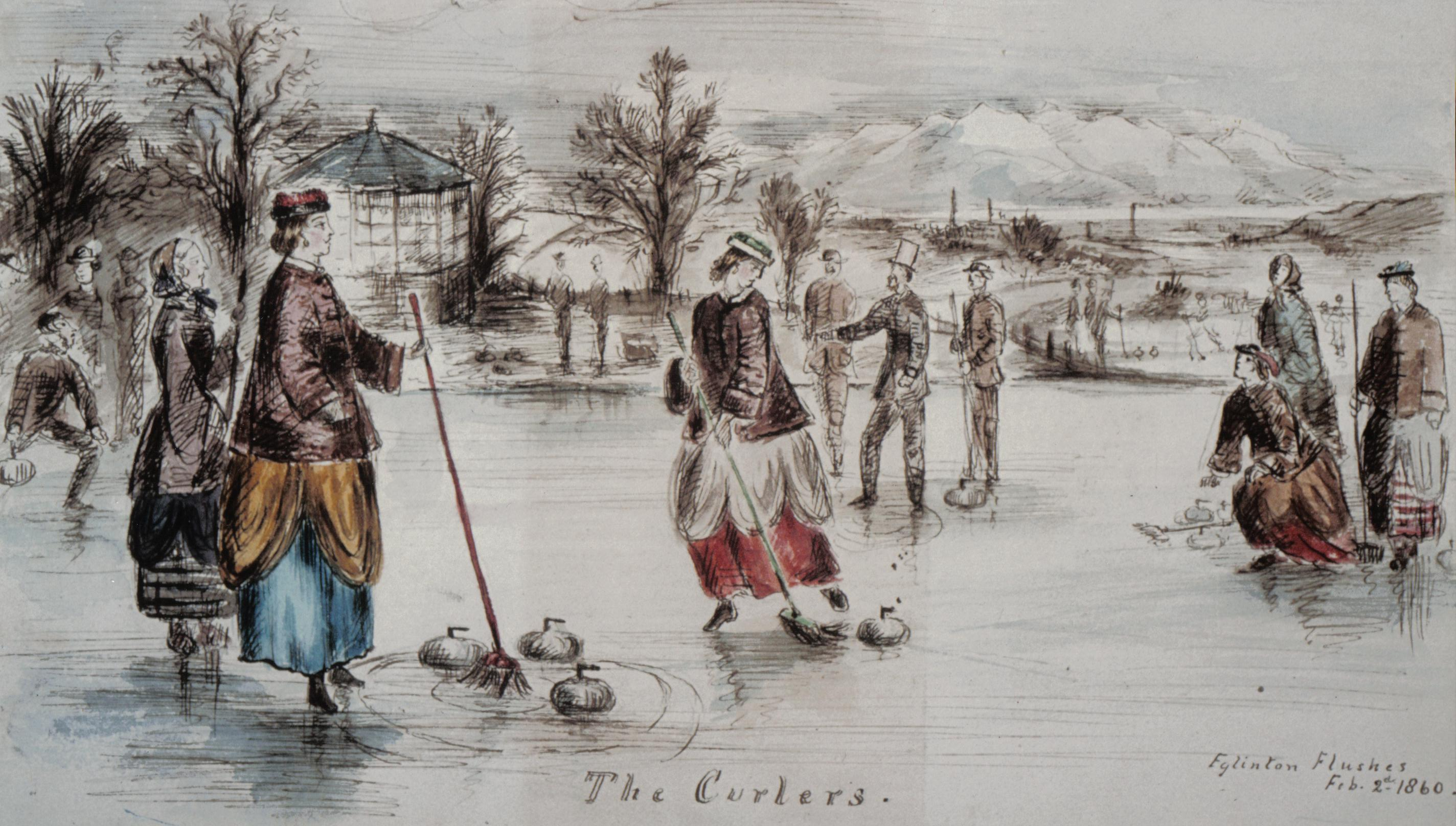
A curling match at the flushes, Eglinton Castle, Ayrshire, in 1860. The curling house is located to the left of the picture.

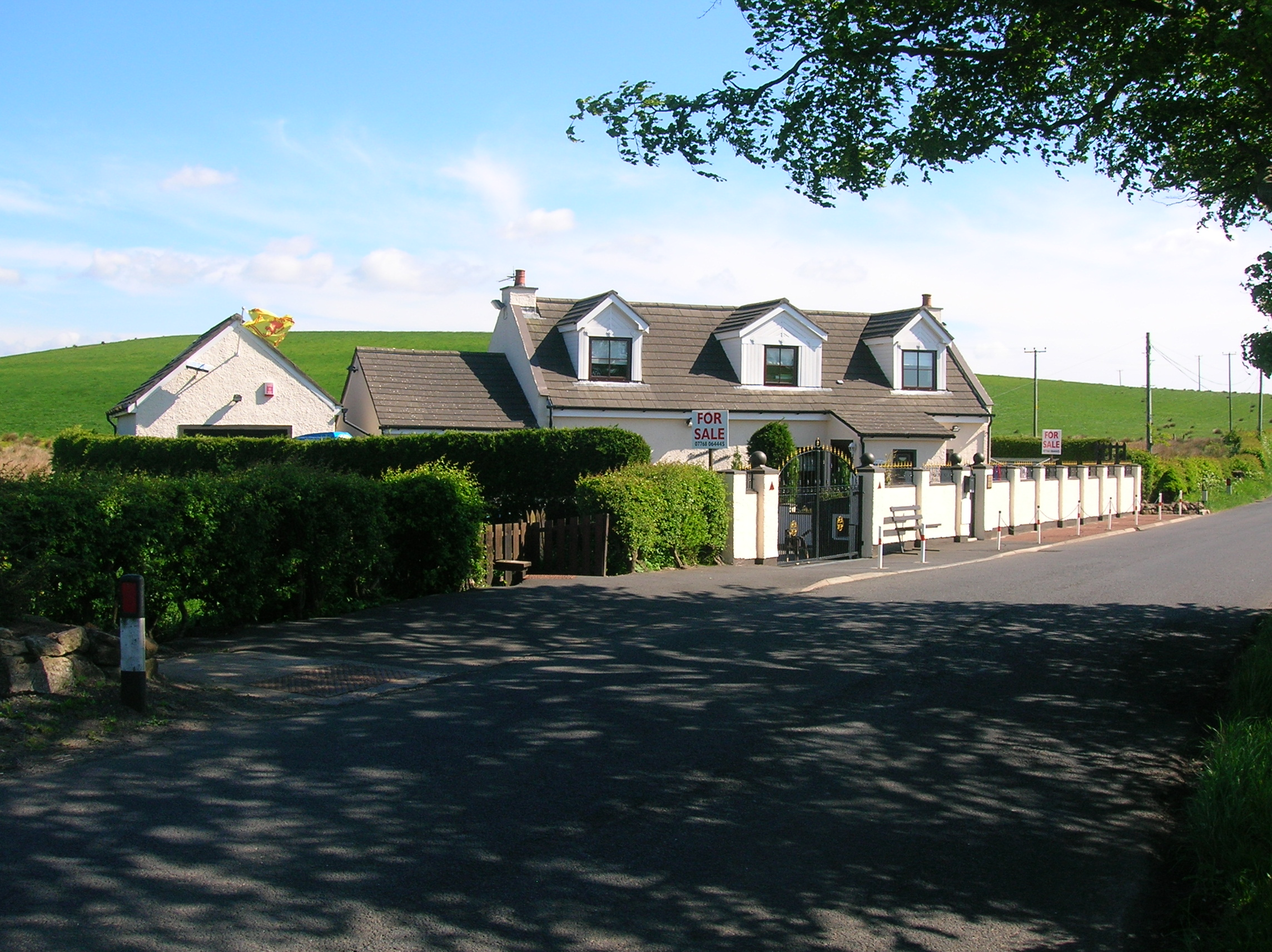
A curling house converted into a dwelling. Stewarton, Ayrshire, Scotland

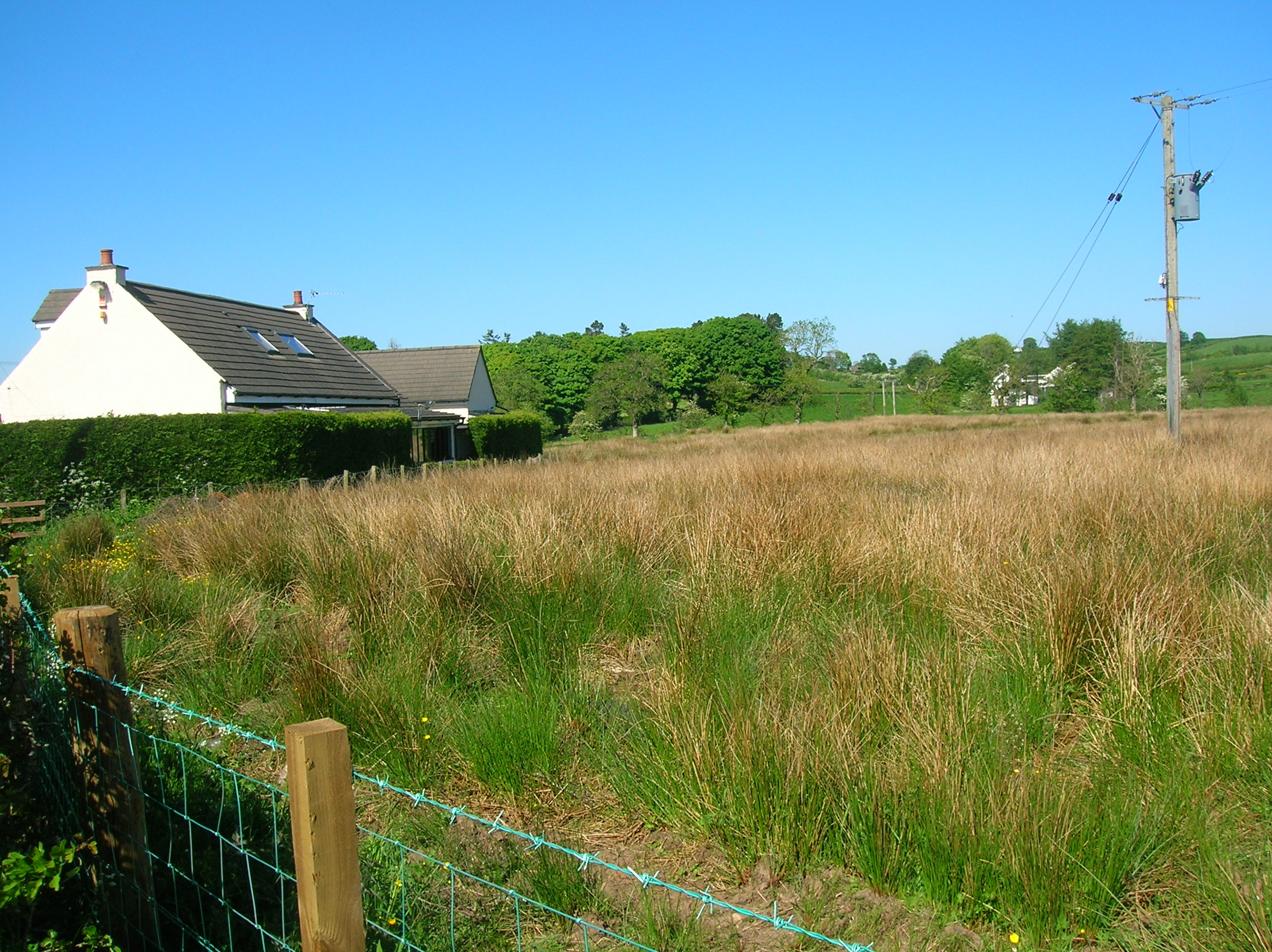
The curling house and site of the old curling pond

== Decline ==
Easier transport, establishment of ice rinks, and other factors have in general resulted in the demise of the Curling House. Due to their generally small size, most have been allowed to become ruins or have been demolished.

== Sites of curling houses ==
- Beith, North Ayrshire. In 1888 Mr Patrick of Grangehill both overhauled the Curling Pond on his estate and built a large Curling House for the players.
- Craigie village, South Ayrshire. A small rectangular brick built house with one fireplace, now roofless. The house lies in a meadow beneath the old manse; the pond is now just a wet pasture (2009).
- Dollar, Clackmannanshire. One Septimus Leishman made a handsome donation to the club in 1885 to enable a "modern" pond and clubhouse to be built in the town in Murray Place.
- Duddingston Loch, Edinburgh. A rare octagonal curling-house and artist studio (Duddingston Manse) built for the Duddingston Curling Society & Rev. John Thomson 1823–4. The upper floor was the studio and he named it 'Edinburgh', allowing his housekeeper to say that he had 'gone to Edinburgh' if a parishioner called when he was painting or curling. The house was designed by the renowned architect William Henry Playfair, and he evidently provided his services free. The curling-house still stands at the lochside though roofless. 55°56′29.89″N 3°8′48.23″W
- Eglinton Country Park, Irvine, Ayrshire. The Curling House no longer exists, however it is featured in a contemporary painting (See illustration). 55°38′30.4″N 4°40′17.9″W
- Fingask Castle, Perthshire. A vernacular example with a chimney on one gable end (See illustration). 56°26′2.07″N 3°15′10.27″W
- Fochabers, Moray. An ornate curling house still survives, built with wood, some of it unworked, serving as 'tree trunk' supports to the roof.
- Gosford House, Aberlady. A surviving curling house here has unusual shell decorations. and is faced with tufa-like stone.
- Lindores Loch, Fife. It was built by the Abdie Curling Club in the mid-1860s on the site of an older building and although now roofed with corrugated iron it was previously thatched. The walls are covered with stout wooden shelves where the stones were stored and other items such as crampits and wooden tee markers. A simple table and chair completed the furnishings together with an open fire. The windows were not glazed and had stout metal bars for security.
- Markinch, Fife. A fine stone “curling house” was built in around 1850 with three rooms, the Laird's room, (the Laird being Mr. Balfour, of Balbirnie House), the west room and the curling stone room. The club moved from the site in 1914. 56.20174°N 3.13951°W
- Newfarm Loch, East Ayrshire. The loch was situated in a low-lying area between the farms of Holehouse and Newfarm in the Parish of Kilmarnock. The loch was mostly artificial and had stone built Curling Houses as well as wooden pavilions.
- Partick, Glasgow - The Partick Curling Club was established in 1842 and in 1900 they acquired a long lease on the site in the new Victoria Park where they constructed a clubhouse and ponds.
