= Denmylne Castle =

16th century castle in Newburgh, Fife, Scotland

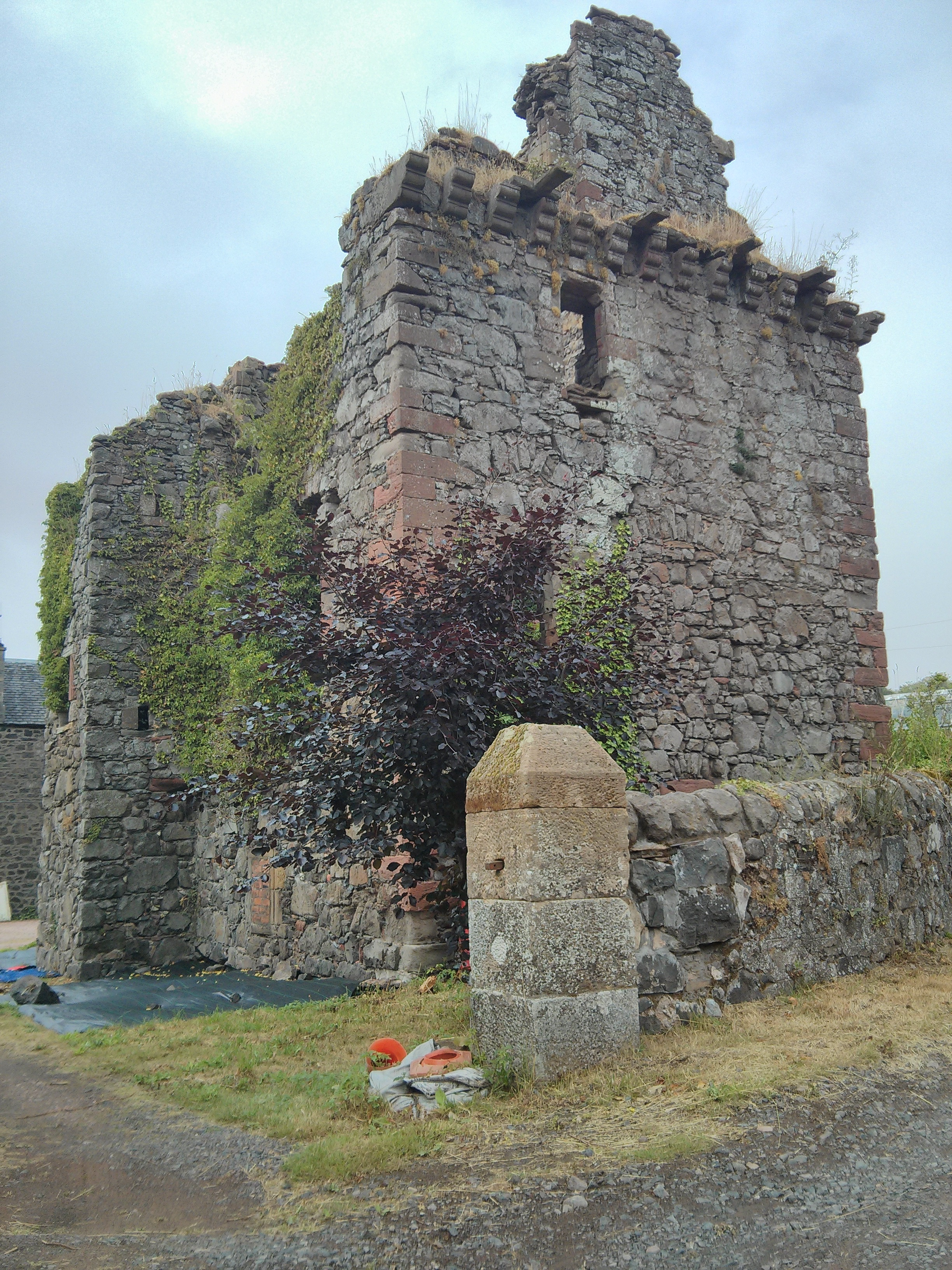
- Ruins of Denmylne Castle
- Interactive map of Denmylne Castle
- 56.34430°N 3.21606°W
- Type: Castle
- Location: Newburgh, Fife, Scotland
- OS grid reference: NO 24931 17547

Site notes
- Material: Stone
- Condition: Ruined
- Public access: Yes

Scheduled monument
- Official name: Denmylne Castle 1600m SE of Newburgh
- Designated: 29 December 1936
- Reference no.: SM852

Denmylne Castle is a ruined 16th-century tower house, about 1 mile (1.6 km) south east of Newburgh, Fife, Scotland, and 1 mile (1.6 km) north west of Lindores Loch It may be known alternatively as Den Miln Castle. It is a scheduled monument.

== History ==
The Balfours owned the property from 1452 to 1710. The castle dates from the late 16th century.

In 1460 James Balfour of Denmylne died at the siege of Roxburgh Castle, while John his son was killed in the battle of Flodden in 1513.

In 1617 Sir Michael Balfour of Denmylne's watermills were targeted by armed vandals who demolished the dam on Auld Lindores Loch. The flood broke the axles and wheels of the mills, and nearly demolished the buildings. The mill lades were filled up with red mud, as was a nearby house called Burnside belonging to John Leslie, 6th Earl of Rothes.

Arms of the Balfours of Denmylne

Sir James Balfour, 1st Baronet of Denmilne and Kinnaird was appointed Lord Lyon King of Arms in 1639 (according to Coventry). He compiled an important collection of Scottish historical manuscripts; and he also officiated at the coronations of both Charles I and Charles II. His brother Sir Andrew Balfour was the founder of the first Edinburgh Botanic Garden.

== Structure ==
The tower house is cross shaped, comprising a main block, a stair-tower projecting centrally, and a matching small rectangular tower. The structure has three storeys, and a garret with a corbelled-out parapet at one gable. There are large windows, and a number of gunloops. A courtyard surrounded the castle.

The main block is 41.5 feet (12.6 m) by 24 feet (7.3 m). It lies north west to south east. The stair wing is to the north east and the other projection to the south west.

== See also ==
- Castles in Great Britain and Ireland
- List of castles in Scotland
- Scheduled monuments in Fife
