= John Mackay Wilson =

Scottish writer (1804–1835)

John Mackay Wilson (15 August 1804 – 2 October 1835) was a Scottish writer who wrote the eponymous "Wilson's Tales of The Borders (and of Scotland)" He was born in Tweedmouth, on the border between Scotland and England. He gave many talks to Temperance societies.

Whilst editor of the Berwick Advertiser, Wilson began publishing local stories. Their popularity led to him reprinting and extending them into a weekly broadsheet, priced at 1 1/2d (a penny halfpenny) Although he died within a year, with his obituary published in issue 49, the Tales ran to 312 editions, in all carrying 485 tales or serialisations. After his death the Tales continued under the editorship of others, in part to provide income for his widow and family. The most notable contributor and subsequent editor being Alexander Leighton.

As well as editing the newspaper, Wilson also wrote poetry and plays. The Wilson's Tales Project now hosts a literary dinner on the anniversary of his death, at which his poem 'Beans and Bacon' is performed. The circumstances and penury of the central character of the poem are generally regarded as being semi autobiographical.

His plays include The Gowrie Conspiracy and Margaret of Anjou.

== Sources ==
- British Listed Buildings – Gravestone of John Mackay Wilson
- National Library of New Zealand
