= Newburgh, Fife =

Town in Scotland

Newburgh: Scottish Gaelic: Am Borgh Ùr
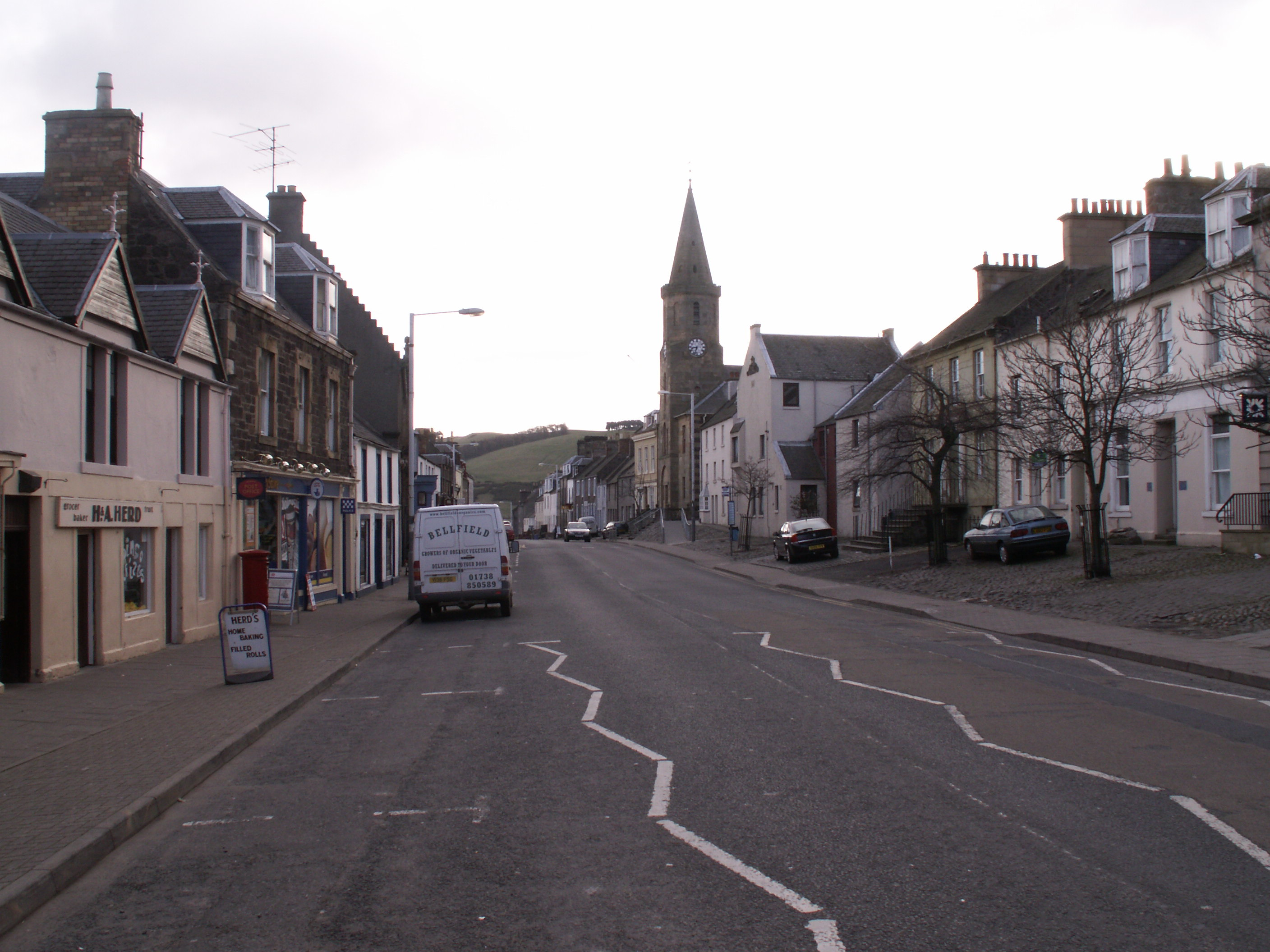
- Newburgh High Street and central tower

- Location within Fife
- Population: 2,110 (2020)
- OS grid reference: NO234183
  - Edinburgh: 28 mi (45 km)
  - London: 358 mi (576 km)
- Council area: Fife
- Lieutenancy area: Fife
- Country: Scotland
- Sovereign state: United Kingdom
- Post town: Cupar
- Postcode district: KY14
- Police: Scotland
- Fire: Scottish
- Ambulance: Scottish
- UK Parliament: North East Fife
- Scottish Parliament: North East Fife

Newburgh (Scottish Gaelic: Am Borgh Ùr) is a royal burgh and parish in Fife, Scotland, at the south shore of the Firth of Tay. The town has a population of 2,171 (in 2011), which constitutes a 10% increase since 1901 when the population was counted at 1,904 persons.

The town has a long history of fishing and industrial heritage. Lindores Abbey lies at the eastern edge of the town.

== History ==
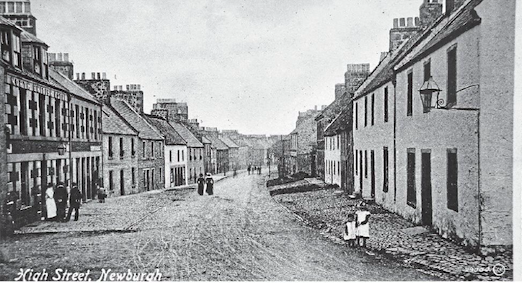
Newburgh's high street in the 19th century. The North British Hotel (later the Tayview Bar; today's number 230) is on the left. Built around 1840, the building is now considered at-risk

In 1266 Newburgh was granted burgh status by King Alexander III, as a burgh belonging to the Abbot of Lindores. In 1600, Newburgh was given to Patrick Leslie, 1st Lord Lindores, son of the Earl of Rothes. In 1631, Newburgh was made a Royal Burgh by King Charles I.

Since the Second World War many new houses have been built in Newburgh but the population has only increased by about 10%, partly due to lower average occupancy rates.

For some time, Newburgh's industries chiefly consisted of the making of linen, linoleum floorcloth, oilskin fabric and quarrying. There was for many years a net and coble fishery on the Firth Of Tay, mainly for salmon and sea trout.

The harbour area was used originally for boatbuilding and the transshipment of cargoes to Perth for vessels of over 200 tons. Raw materials for making linoleum such as cork and linseed oil were also imported at the "Factory Pier". Aggregates from the Whin Stone quarry were also shipped from Bell's Pier.

The main employer from the early 1920s was the linoleum factory known locally as the "Tayside", operated by the Tayside Floorcloth Company. In the subsequent decades, Newburgh was a prosperous industrial town pulling in workers for the factories from surrounding towns and villages. As linoleum fell out of fashion in the late 1960s and 1970s, attempts were made to produce vinyl flooring and tiles but the factory was no longer profitable. After several changes in ownership it finally closed in 1980 after a large fire destroyed much of the building.

Situated to the East of the linoleum factory was another factory known locally as "The Oilskin". Since before the First World War, its mostly female workers produced oilskin fabric for waterproof clothing such as fishermen's suits and Sou'westers. The factory was taken over by textiles giant Courtaulds in the 1960s but it also closed some years later as demand for the product declined.

As of 2020, most industries in Newburgh have closed except for quarrying, which is now the town's biggest single employer. It is mainly a dormitory town with many of those of working age commuting for work to Perth, Dundee, and Glenrothes. Local trades and services include a health centre, nursing home, and supermarket on the site of the former Ship Inn.

In 2017 a new whisky distillery opened on the site of Lindores Abbey at the east end of Newburgh. This produces Lindores Abbey whisky on the site where "Aqua vitae"—an early form of whisky—was produced by the monks. The distillery incorporates an event venue and offers catering and tours of the distillery and Abbey ruins.

After many years of lying derelict, the linoleum factory was demolished and cleared and its site is now a recreational waterfront linked to the Mugdrum Park and the Fife Coastal Path.

== Local structures ==
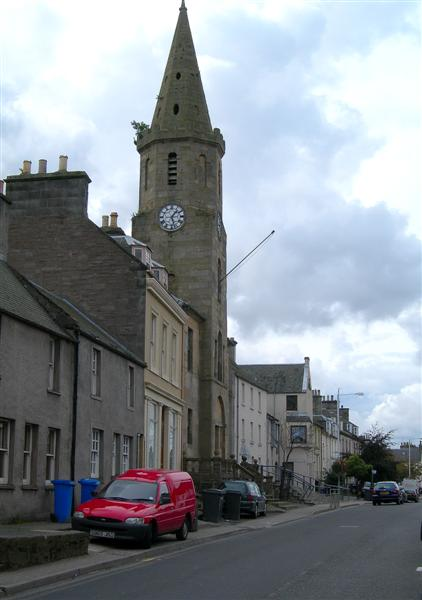
Newburgh Town House

=== Town house ===
Newburgh Town House was designed in the Italianate style, with a central tower and spire, and built on the south side of the High Street in 1808. It forms a continuous block with the other houses. The Laing Museum and Library was added to the north side of the street in 1894-96.

=== Macduff's Cross ===
On high ground, about 1 mile (1.6 km) southwest of the town (at 56°20′20″N 3°14′44″W) stand the remains of Macduff's Cross, of which only the pedestal survives. In legend, it marks the spot where clan Macduff was granted rights of sanctuary and composition for murder, in return for its chief's services against Macbeth.

=== Denmylne Castle ===
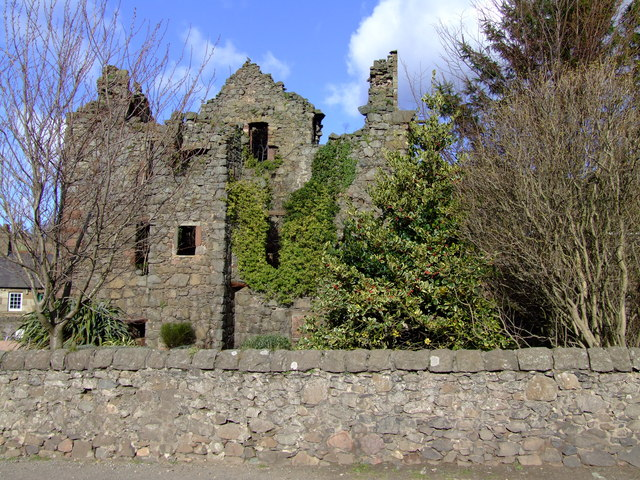
Denmylne Castle

Denmylne Castle, about 1 mile (1.6 km) south-east of Newburgh on the Cupar road, was the home for more than 250 years of the Balfour of Denmylne family, of which the brother, James and Andrew were the most distinguished members. The castle was abandoned in 1772 when the estate was sold and now stands within a 19th-century steading whose construction will have necessitated the removal of the castle's subsidiary buildings. It has been unroofed for at least 200 years and is in a state of disrepair. A lintel dated 1620 has been re-used in one of the steading's building. It is a scheduled monument.

=== Lindores Abbey ===
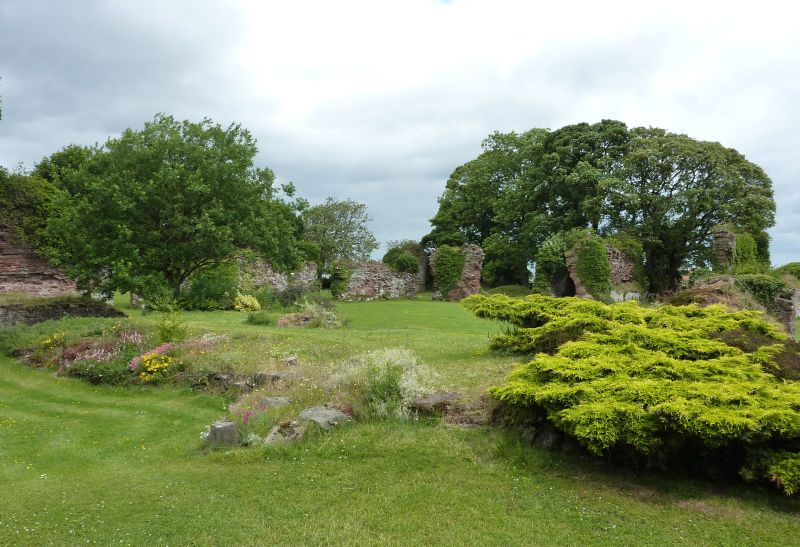
Lindores Abbey

Lindores Abbey is situated near the Tay, on the East side of the town. Only fragments remain of the Tironensian (reformed Benedictine) abbey, founded about 1190 by David of Scotland, Earl of Huntingdon, brother of William I the Lion. Nonetheless, the ground plan of the whole structure can still be traced. Best preserved are the south-west gateway through the precinct wall, various remains of the wall itself, and part of the east cloister range, including the still-vaulted slype, all built of local red sandstone. The monastic church itself had a single aisle on the north side, with aisled north and south transepts, a central tower and a detached western tower or campanile, similar to Cambuskenneth Abbey. It is a scheduled monument.

The monks were noted agriculturists and oversaw famous orchards. Some houses in Newburgh's High Street are said to have orchards with trees descended from the original plantings, although many plots have now been sold and developed for housing. Numerous architectural fragments from the Abbey are built into buildings in the town.

Lindores Abbey is also famous as the birthplace of Scotch Whisky owing to its links to Friar John Cor and the Exchequer Rolls of 1494. The Abbey is now home to the McKenzie Smith family and has been for 100 years. The site is being preserved, and saw a new distillery opened in 2017.

=== Clatchard Craig Hill fort ===
The multi-walled Pictish hill fort of Clatchard Craig once stood to the south of the town. Archeological excavations have shown that the fort was occupied between the sixth and eighth centuries AD, as a site of high status. The fort was destroyed by quarrying during the late twentieth century.

== Culture ==
Newburgh has been noted for its Christmas lights, which are designed by local children.

== Natural areas nearby ==
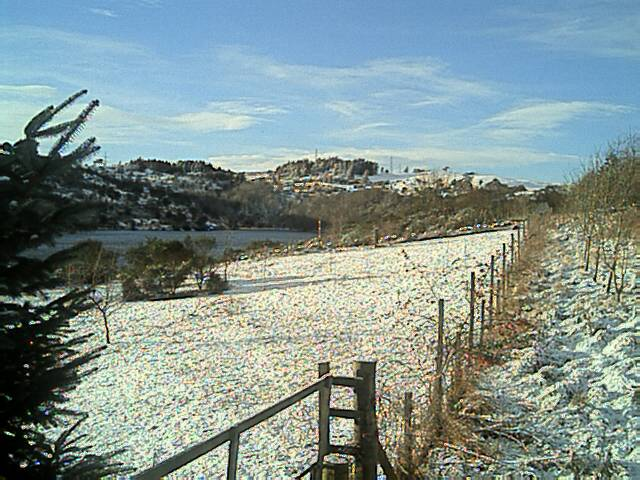
Lochmill Loch

Nearby Lochmill Loch has been dammed to provide the town with a water supply and fishing.

At Blackearnside, a forest of alders, to the east of the village, William Wallace defeated Aymer de Valence, 2nd Earl of Pembroke in 1298.

Mugdrum Island, opposite the large Mugdrum estate from which it takes its name, ("ridge of the pig[s]" in Gaelic), is offshore in the Firth dividing it into 'North Deep' and 'South Deep' channels. For many years cattle were ferried over to the island for summer grazing, but this is no longer practised.

== Sport ==
Newburgh is home to the football club Newburgh, who compete in the East of Scotland League Third Division, and an active sailing club.

== Transportation ==
Newburgh is situated on the Firth of Tay, seven miles (11 km) northwest of Ladybank Junction alongside the Edinburgh to Aberdeen railway line (between Perth and Ladybank). Newburgh railway station served the town from 1848 to 1955. There is an active campaign to reopen the station. Fife Scottish (now Stagecoach in Fife) used to have a bus depot in the town at East Shore Road; however, this was closed in 1991. No buses are now based in Newburgh although the Perth to Glenrothes and Newburgh to St Andrews via Ladybank station services still serve the town.

The town lies on the A913.

== Notable people ==
- Samuel Amess (1826–1898), 25th Mayor of Melbourne.
- Robert Hunter (1823–1897), lexicographer and encyclopaedist.
- Betty Law (1928–2001), curler.
- Robert Lawson (1833–1902), architect.
