= Lindores =

Village in Fife, Scotland

Coordinates: 56.33873°N 3.19051°W

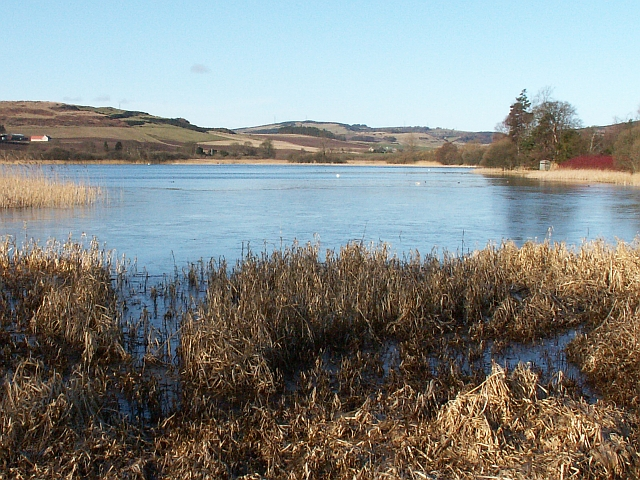
Lindores Loch

Lindores is a small village in Fife, Scotland, in the parish of Abdie, about 2 miles south-east of Newburgh. It is situated on the north-east shore of Lindores Loch, a 44 ha freshwater loch. A possible derivation of the name Lindores is 'church by the water'. The ruins of Abdie church, about 0.5 miles south-west of the village are possibly the site of an ancient shrine connected to the Celtic foundation at Abernethy. After the foundation of Lindores Abbey in 1191 the church was given to the abbey.

The Abdie stone, a Pictish stone dating from the 6th or 7th century stood on a nearby ridge until around 1850, but is now in the church yard housed in a modified morthouse.

Traces of an ancient castle, thought to have belonged to Macduff, Thane of Fife, have been found at the eastern end of the village. The battle of Black Irnsyde, at which William Wallace defeated Aymer de Valence, the 2nd Earl of Pembroke, is claimed to have been fought near the village, though this does not fit with known historical facts.

== Transport ==
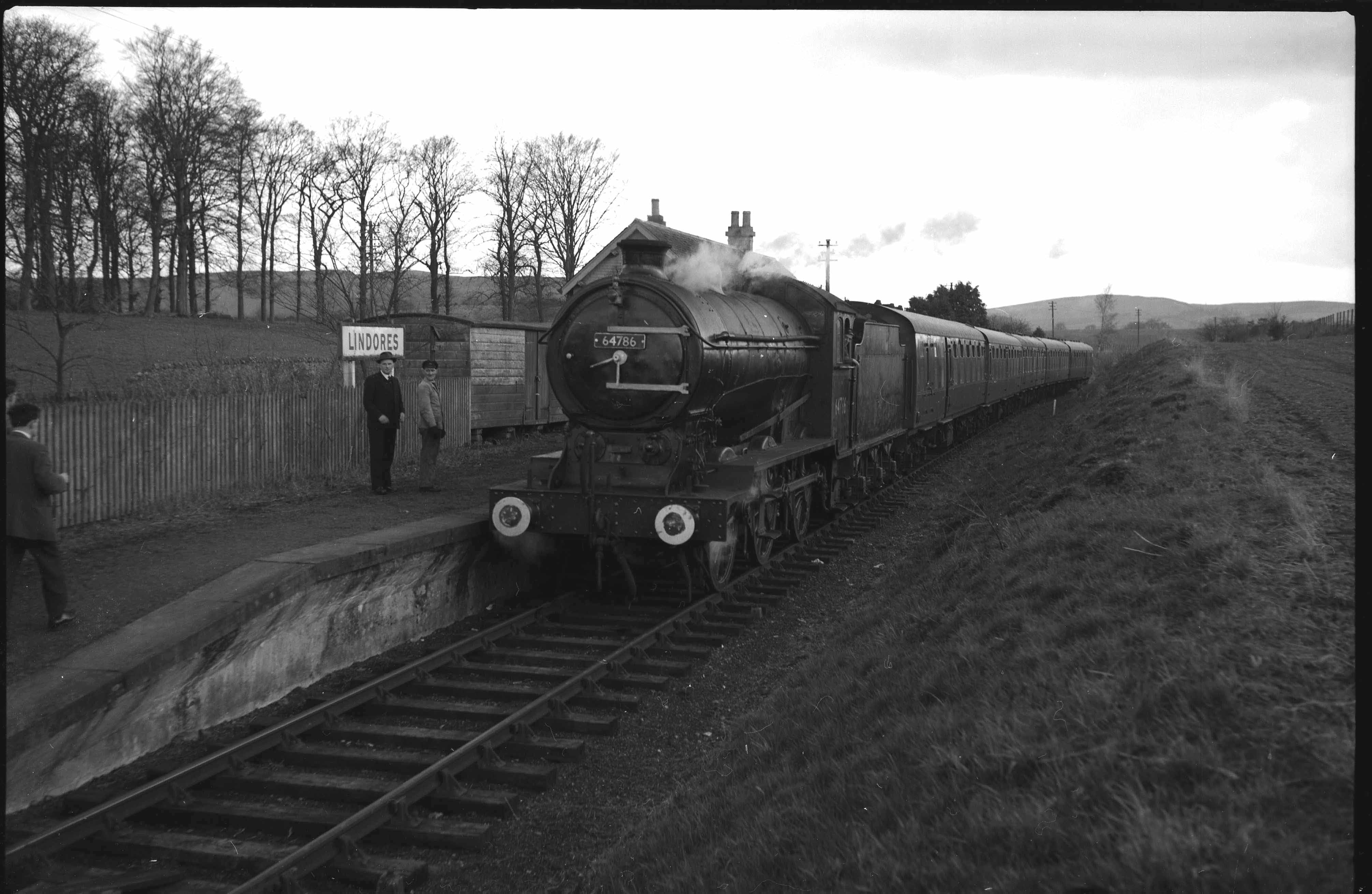
The railway station

Lindores had a station on the Newburgh and North Fife Railway which was open to passengers between 1909 and 1951. The railway has since been lifted.
