= Lindores Loch =

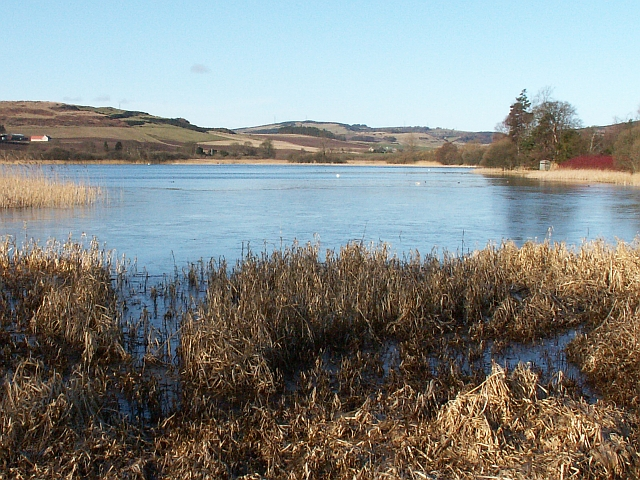

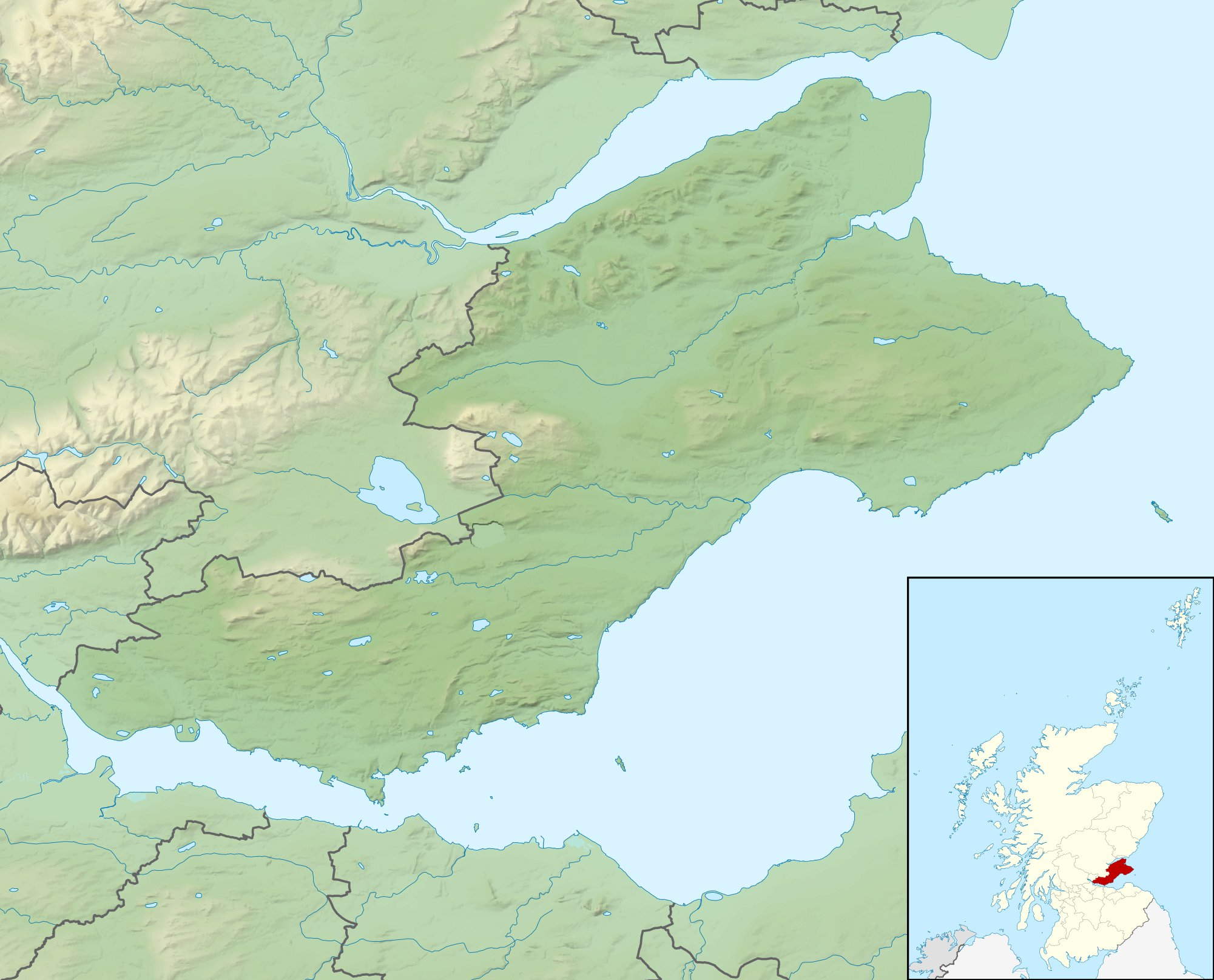
- Location within Fife
- Location: North Fife, Central Scotland
- Coordinates: 56°20′N 3°11′W
- Type: freshwater loch, ribbon lake
- Primary inflows: Priest's Burn
- Primary outflows: Lindores Burn
- Catchment area: 510 ha (1,300 acres)
- Basin countries: Scotland
- Max. length: 1.3 km (0.81 mi)
- Max. width: 500 m (1,600 ft)
- Surface area: 40.5 ha (100 acres)
- Average depth: 1.5 m (4 ft 11 in)
- Max. depth: 3 m (9.8 ft)
- Residence time: 1.9 years
- Surface elevation: 64 m (210 ft)
- Islands: 0
- Sections/sub-basins: curling pond, main basin
- Settlements: Lindores

Lindores Loch is a freshwater loch, situated in North Fife in the Parish of Abdie, in the Central Belt of Scotland. The Loch has for many years been used as a fishery and is well known for its abundant fish life. A curling pond is situated on the Northern shoreline and is nominally used by the Abdie Curling Club and Abdie ladies Curling Club. A speculative study suggests that the loch was created by glacial deposits from the surrounding Ochil Hills at the end of the last ice-age. The water level and shoreline have changed over time due to roads, railway, sluice gate and farmland.

== Natural history ==
Lindores Loch is a protected Site of Special Scientific Interest (SSSI) and is designated for the flora and fauna of its wetlands and open water habitats. Specifically its high diversity of pondweeds (potamogeton), large area of reed bed, wet woodland and notable birds. There are also two rare species of water beetle recorded at this site.

== Geography ==
The loch is nestled in the Ochil Hills between Woodmill Hill to the west and Dunboghill to the East and Kinnaird Hill to the North. The water stretches from the village of Lindores southwards for a distance of 1.3 km. It is a shallow loch with a maximum depth of 3m.

== History ==
The old Abdie Parish Church ruins are close to the north shoreline. The ruins of Inchrye House, a grand Victorian Gothic house to which estate the loch once belonged, lay to the East. The rail line between Perth and Ladybank is located on the west shoreline. The loch was an important source of water for powering mills in the Lindores valley, where up to 13 mills of various types operated from the Middle Ages up to the 20th century. In 1617 armed vandals destroyed two mills belonging to Sir Michael Balfour of Denmilne by demolishing the dam. A rare mid-1860s curling house survives here, once used by the Abdie Curling Club to store its members curling stones and other equipment.

== Culture ==
The area near Lindores Loch is mentioned in Sir Walter Scott's play Macduff's Cross:

'You do gaze—
Strangers are wont to do so—on the prospect.
Yon is the Tay, rolled down from Highland hills,
That rests his waves, after so rude a race,
In the fair plains of Gowrie.

—Further westward,
Proud Stirling rises.

—Yonder to the east
Dundee, the gift of God, and fair Montrose,

And still more northward, lie the ancient towers
Of Edzell.'

Many travel guides and books have mentioned the beauty of the area and loch:

'Lindores Loch is a beautiful sheet of water, nearly a mile in length. It is frequented by wild ducks, and abounds with perch and pike. The neighbouring scenery is picturesque.'

'...in this small spot nature has crowded together all that can delight the eye, and elevate the imagination.'
