= Abdie =

Coordinates: 56.3365°N 3.2038°W

- Location within Fife
- Population: 421 (2011 Census)
- OS grid reference: NO2567416666
- Council area: Fife
- Lieutenancy area: Fife
- Country: Scotland
- Sovereign state: United Kingdom
- Post town: CUPAR
- Postcode district: KY14
- Dialling code: 01337
- Police: Scotland
- Fire: Scottish
- Ambulance: Scottish
- UK Parliament: North East Fife
- Scottish Parliament: North East Fife

Abdie is a parish in north-west Fife, Scotland, lying on the south shore of the Firth of Tay on the eastern outskirts of Newburgh, extending about 3 miles eastwards to the boundary of Dunbog parish, with which it is now united ecclesiastically and for the Community Council. It is also bounded by Collessie on the south and has a small border with the parish of Moonzie in the south-east.

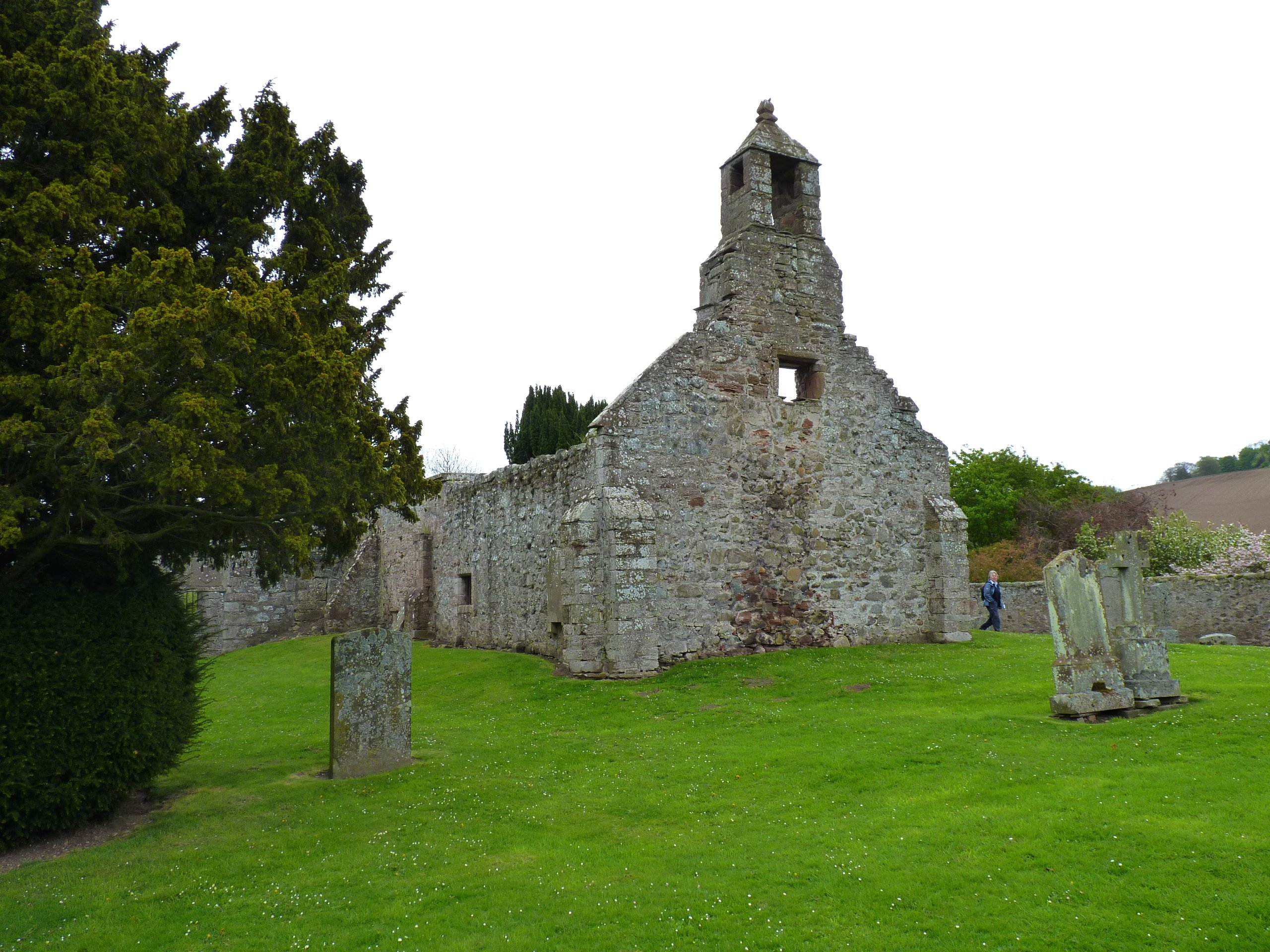
The ruins of the old Abdie parish church, near the shore of Lindores Loch

The civil parish had a population of 421 at the 2011 Census and its area is 4850 acres.

The parish contains the hamlet of Lindores on the north side of Lindores Loch, which is 4 miles in circumference and lies near the centre of the parish.

The present church was built in 1826/27, to a design by William Burn, replacing the pre-reformation church, St Macgridin's, which stands as a ruin nearby. That church was consecrated by Bishop David de Bernham in 1242 and in pre-Reformation days was controlled by Lindores Abbey, whose remains lie just outside Newburgh. The old church was abandoned on 11.11.1827 when the new church was consecrated. the church bell (dated 1671) was moved to the new church at this date. Abdie and Dunbog parishes became a united charge under one minister from December 1965, with the church building in Dunbog closing in 1983 upon the ecclesiastical parish of Abdie and Dunbog being linked with Newburgh.

The parish seems originally to have had the name Lindores. However, when Lindores Abbey was granted a charter in 1178, the monks kept the old name and thereafter called the parish Abdie (or Abden), from the Gaelic, apainn (earlier apdaine), meaning "abbacy; abbey land".

The parish was originally wider in extent and included the parish of Newburgh, but this was disjoined in 1633. Further in 1891 a detached portion of Abdie in the west was annexed to Newburgh, while another detached portion in the east was united with Dunbog, leaving the main portion as the present parish.

In September 1598 James VI came to Abdie to arrest John Arnot, Goodman of Woodmill, for the murder of John Murray, a servant of Lord Lindores.

== Notable residents ==
- Ninian Imrie FRSE (d. 1820) a soldier and geologist owned the Denmuir estate between Abdie and Dunbog
- The poet brothers Alexander Bethune and John Bethune (1812–1839)
