= Sir James Balfour, 1st Baronet of Denmilne and Kinnaird =

Scottish baronet, historian and Lyons king-of-arms

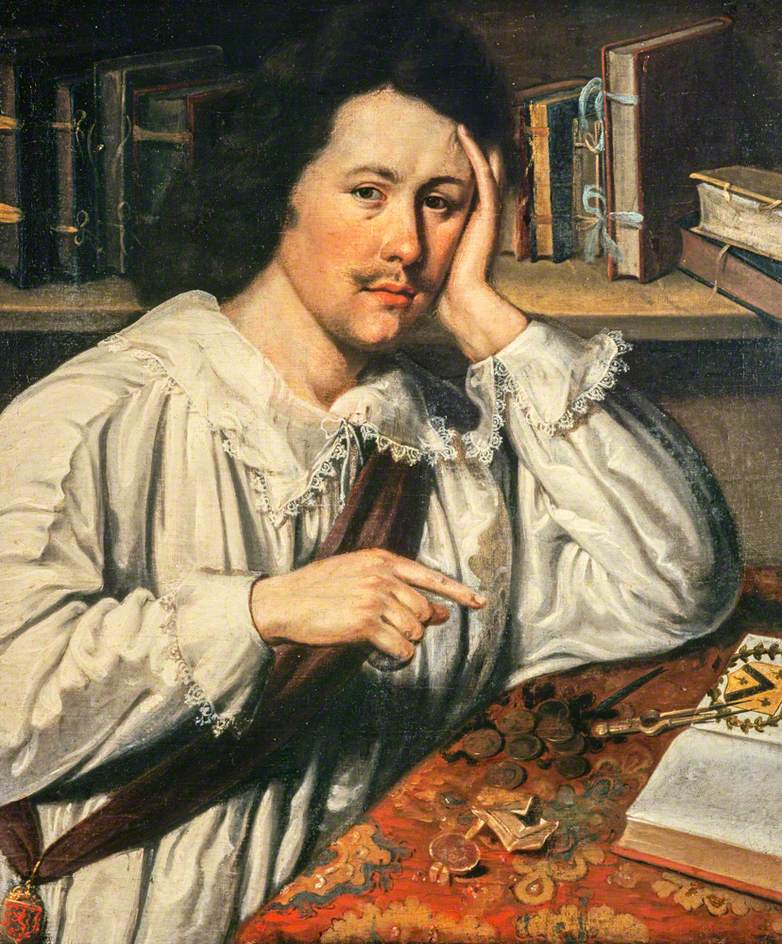
Sir James Balfour, c. 1640

Sir James Balfour, 1st Baronet of Denmilne and Kinnaid (c. 1600 – 1657), of Perth and Kinross, Scotland, was a Scottish annalist and antiquary.

== Biography ==
James Balfour was a son of Sir Michael Balfour of Denmilne, Fife, and Joanna Durham.

Balfour was well acquainted with Sir William Segar and with William Dugdale, to whose Monasticon he contributed. He was knighted by King Charles I in 1630, was made Lord Lyon King of Arms in the same year, and in 1633 baronet of Kinnaird. He was arbitrarily removed from his office of Lord Lyon by Oliver Cromwell and died in 1657.

Some of his numerous works are preserved in the National Library of Scotland at Edinburgh, together with his correspondence, from which rich collection James Haig published Balfour's Annales of Scotland in four volumes (1824–1825). James Maidment published papers from the collection on heraldic subjects and royal ceremonial.

Balfour was an avid manuscript collector. Many of his manuscripts was purchased by the Faculty of Advocates in 1698 and are now in the National Library of Scotland.

== Arms ==
His arms were Or, on a chevron sable between three cinquefoils vert an otter's head erased of the field but also given as three trefoils slipped vert.

Coat of arms of Sir James Balfour of Denmilne and Kinnaird
Escutcheon Or on a chevron sable between three trefoils slipped vert an otter's head erased argent. Previous versions His arms were also blazoned as: Or, on a chevron sable between three cinquefoils vert an otter's head erased of the field.

Heraldic offices
Preceded by Sir Jerome Lindsay	Lord Lyon King of Arms; 1630–1654	Succeeded by Sir James Campbell
Baronetage of Nova Scotia
New creation	Baronet (of Denmiln and Kinnaird); 1633 – 1657	Succeeded by Robert Balfour
