= List of Category A listed buildings in Fife =

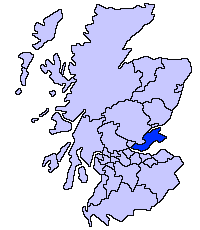
Fife shown within Scotland

This is a list of Category A listed buildings in the Fife council area in east-central Scotland.

In Scotland, the term listed building refers to a building or other structure officially designated as being of "special architectural or historic interest". Category A structures are those considered to be "buildings of national or international importance, either architectural or historic, or fine little-altered examples of some particular period, style or building type." Listing was begun by a provision in the Town and Country Planning (Scotland) Act 1947, and the current legislative basis for listing is the Planning (Listed Buildings and Conservation Areas) (Scotland) Act 1997. The authority for listing rests with Historic Scotland, an executive agency of the Scottish Government, which inherited this role from the Scottish Development Department in 1991. Once listed, severe restrictions are imposed on the modifications allowed to a building's structure or its fittings. Listed building consent must be obtained from local authorities prior to any alteration to such a structure. There are approximately 47,400 listed buildings in Scotland, of which around 8% (some 3,800) are Category A.

The council area of Fife covers 1,325 square kilometres (512 sq mi), and has a population of around 361,900. There are 200 Category A listed buildings in the area, as of February 2017.

== Listed buildings ==
Name	Location	Date listed	Geo-coordinates	Notes	LB number	Image
Gibliston House	Arncroach		56°14′05″N 2°48′41″W	1820 classical villa, extensions by Sir Robert Lorimer	155	Upload another image See more images
The King's Cellar	Limekilns, Academy Square		56°02′06″N 3°29′02″W	16th-century storehouse, possibly incorporating material from 1362	1643	Upload another image See more images
Creich Castle Doocot	Creich		56°22′45″N 3°05′23″W	Dovecote dated 1723	2173	Upload Photo
Bishop Bridge	Ceres, High Street, over Ceres Burn		56°17′29″N 2°58′14″W	17th-century single-arch stone bridge	2366	Upload another image See more images
St John's Masonic Lodge	Ceres		56°17′29″N 2°58′13″W	Mid 18th-century Masonic lodge	2368	Upload another image
Southern outbuilding of Brand's Hotel	Ceres, High Street		56°17′31″N 2°58′14″W	18th-century mill, later a beer store	2393	Upload another image
Fife Folk Museum (Central And North Fife Preservation Society)	Ceres, High Street		56°17′31″N 2°58′14″W	17th-century cottages and weigh house, now a museum	2394	Upload another image See more images
Balcaskie House	Near St Monans		56°13′21″N 2°46′05″W	16th-century house, enlarged by Sir William Bruce for himself in 1688	2503	Upload another image See more images
Balcaskie House, Terraced Garden	Near St Monans		56°13′18″N 2°46′03″W	17th-century Italianate gardens laid out by Sir William Bruce	2504	Upload another image
Balcaskie House, east gatepiers and twin dovecots	Near St Monans		56°13′31″N 2°45′33″W	18th-century gate piers and dovecotes	2506	Upload Photo
Kellie Castle	Arncroach		56°14′14″N 2°46′33″W	14th-century castle with later rebuilding and extensions	2519	Upload another image See more images
Balmerino Abbey, barn	Balmerino		56°24′37″N 3°02′33″W	15th-century barn	2548	Upload Photo
Dairsie Bridge	Dairsie, over River Eden		56°20′01″N 2°56′47″W	Late mediaeval three-arch stone bridge	2607	Upload another image See more images
Dairsie Old Church (St Mary's)	Dairsie		56°20′01″N 2°56′58″W	17th-century Gothic former church	2610	Upload another image See more images
Hill of Tarvit House	Near Cupar		56°17′42″N 3°00′18″W	late-17th-century house remodelled by Sir Robert Lorimer in 1907	2628	Upload another image See more images
Tarvit Farm	Near Cupar		56°18′51″N 2°59′42″W	Steading of circa 1800, with central tower and spire	2674	Upload another image See more images
Benarty House	Near Ballingry		56°09′13″N 3°21′30″W	Earlier 19th-century mansion	3321	Upload Photo
Benarty Steading	Near Ballingry		56°09′16″N 3°21′33″W	Farmstead of circa 1840	3322	Upload Photo
Dunimarle Castle	Culross		56°03′18″N 3°38′38″W	1840 castlellated house by R. and R. Dickson	3349	Upload another image See more images
Inchcolm Abbey	Inchcolm		56°01′48″N 3°18′06″W	Remains of Augustinian monastery dating from the 12th to the 16th centuries	3573	Upload another image See more images
The Murrell	Near Aberdour		56°03′58″N 3°18′23″W	1908 Arts and Crafts country house by Francis William Deas	3598	Upload Photo
Aberdour Kirk, St Fillan's (Church Of Scotland)	Aberdour, Hawkcraig Road		56°03′19″N 3°17′49″W	12th-century church, restored 1926	3608	Upload another image See more images
Seabank House	Aberdour, Shore Road		56°03′04″N 3°17′53″W	Classical villa by Thomas Hamilton, 1831	3632	Upload Photo
Aberdour House	Aberdour		56°03′16″N 3°17′59″W	17th-century house with early-18th-century addition	3636	Upload Photo
Aberdour Castle Sundial (formerly at Aberdour House)	Aberdour		56°03′16″N 3°17′58″W	16th-century stone sundial	3637	Upload another image See more images
Donibristle House	Dalgety Bay		56°01′53″N 3°20′58″W	18th-century service wings by Alexander McGill, main house demolished	3647	Upload another image See more images
Donibristle Chapel	Dalgety Bay		56°01′50″N 3°21′08″W	Mortuary chapel of Earls of Moray by Alexander McGill, 1731	3650	Upload another image See more images
Fordell Castle	Near Dalgety Bay		56°03′13″N 3°22′16″W	16th-century fortified house	3652	Upload another image See more images
Fordell Chapel	Near Dalgety Bay		56°03′12″N 3°22′19″W	Mortuary chapel of Hendersons of Fordell, dated 1650	3653	Upload Photo
Limekilns	Charlestown, Harbour Road		56°02′09″N 3°30′12″W	Range of fourteen 18th-century lime kilns	3741	Upload another image See more images
Broomhall	Limekilns		56°02′14″N 3°28′59″W	Neo-Classical mansion by Thomas Harrison, 1796	3745	Upload Photo
Pitfirrane Castle	Crossford		56°03′31″N 3°30′21″W	16th-century L-plan tower house	3759	Upload another image
Logie House	Crossford		56°03′34″N 3°28′55″W	16th-century tower house with 19th-century classical remodelling	3776	Upload Photo
Logie House, Steading	Crossford		56°03′41″N 3°29′06″W	Late-18th-century steading and granary	3777	Upload Photo
Greenside Farm Steading	Near Ceres		56°15′17″N 2°58′52″W	18th-century farm buildings	4302	Upload another image
Wormiston, Doocot	Near Crail		56°16′38″N 2°37′53″W	Early-17th-century rectangular dovecote	4329	Upload another image
Aberdour Castle	Aberdour		56°03′18″N 3°17′53″W	Buildings dating from 12th to 17th centuries, partly ruined	6421	Upload another image See more images
East Lodge and gates	Aberdour, High Street		56°03′10″N 3°18′14″W	Former lodge of Donibristle Estate by J Maitland and Wardrop, 1870	6632	Upload another image
Charleton House	Colinsburgh		56°13′28″N 2°52′23″W	18th-century country house	8581	Upload another image See more images
Balcarres House	Colinsburgh		56°13′45″N 2°50′59″W	16th-century Z-plan tower house with 19th-century extensions by William Burn and David Bryce, and 18th-century dower house	8625	Upload another image See more images
Balcarres House, sundial	Colinsburgh		56°13′44″N 2°51′01″W	17th-century sundial from Leuchars Castle	8627	Upload another image See more images
House of Falkland (St Ninian's RC School)	Falkland		56°15′11″N 3°13′28″W	Jacobean mansion by William Burn, 1844	8763	Upload another image See more images
Randerston Farm House	Kingsbarns		56°17′18″N 2°38′02″W	Late-16th-century laird's house	8796	Upload Photo
Falkland Palace	Falkland		56°15′13″N 3°12′23″W	Former Royal palace, mostly built in the first half of the 16th century	8798	Upload another image See more images
Falkland Palace, Royal Stables and Tennis Court or Caichpule	Falkland		56°15′20″N 3°12′21″W	16th-century ancillary buildings	8800	Upload another image
Kilmany Parish Kirk	Kilmany		56°23′03″N 2°59′32″W	18th-century church	8826	Upload another image See more images
Parish Kirk of St Athernase	Leuchars, Schoolhill		56°22′54″N 2°53′00″W	12th-century Romanesque church	8842	Upload another image See more images
Leuchars Castle, Doocot	Leuchars		56°23′11″N 2°53′20″W	17th-century round dovecote	8851	Upload another image See more images
Earlshall Castle	Leuchars		56°22′44″N 2°52′06″W	16th-century tower house, extended in the 17th century	8852	Upload another image See more images
Earlshall Doocot	Leuchars		56°22′42″N 2°52′07″W	late-16th-century rectangular dovecote	8853	Upload another image
Pitcullo Castle	Near Balmullo		56°21′44″N 2°57′03″W	Late-16th-century L-plan tower house, extended in the 17th century	8857	Upload another image
Guardbridge (Old)	Guardbridge, over River Eden		56°21′33″N 2°53′19″W	16th-century six-arch stone bridge	8861	Upload another image See more images
Vicarsford Cemetery Chapel	Leuchars	17 October 1973	56°25′13″N 2°54′41″W	Late 19th-century chapel in 13th-century French Gothic style	8863	Upload another image See more images
West Pitkierie Dovecot	Near Anstruther		56°14′25″N 2°43′10″W	Later 18th-century octagonal dovecote	8979	Upload another image See more images
Elie House (Convent Of St Marty Reparatrice)	Elie		56°11′48″N 2°48′53″W	17th-century mansion with 18th- and 19th-century additions	9000	Upload another image See more images
Scotscraig House	Tayport		56°26′34″N 2°54′09″W	17th-century arched gateway	9004	Upload Photo
Lathrisk House	Freuchie		56°15′47″N 3°10′30″W	18th-century classical mansion	9042	Upload Photo
Raith Estate, Raith House	Kirkcaldy		56°06′46″N 3°11′51″W	Palladian mansion by James Smith, 1694	9681	Upload Photo
Raith Estate, Stable Court (Home Farm)	Kirkcaldy		56°06′49″N 3°11′58″W	18th-century stables, possibly by James Playfair	9682	Upload Photo
Leslie House	Leslie		56°12′12″N 3°11′42″W	17th-century classical house by John Mylne and William Bruce	9693	Upload another image See more images
Forth Bridge	North Queensferry, across the Firth of Forth		55°59′54″N 3°23′15″W	Cantilevered railway viaduct, designed by Sir John Fowler and Sir Benjamin Baker, and completed in 1890 (Note: Also in City of Edinburgh, as it crosses the Forth which is the council boundary)	9977	Upload another image See more images
North Queensferry, Town Pier	North Queensferry		56°00′27″N 3°23′43″W	Pier built by John Rennie, 1813, and extended by Thomas Telford, 1834	9978	Upload another image
Old Duloch House	Duloch		56°03′15″N 3°23′31″W	18th-century classical mansion	9981	Upload Photo
North Queensferry, Pierhead, Lantern Tower	North Queensferry		56°00′30″N 3°23′41″W	Small hexagonal lighthouse by John Rennie, circa 1812	9998	Upload Photo
Melville House	Monimail, Ladybank		56°18′41″N 3°08′05″W	Late-17th-century country house by James Smith	15448	Upload another image See more images
Cunnoquhie House	Letham		56°19′28″N 3°06′44″W	Late-18th- or early-19th-century classical mansion	15469	Upload another image
Over Rankeilour House	Letham		56°18′35″N 3°05′13″W	Late-18th-century classical mansion	15486	Upload another image
Monimail Tower or Palace (also known as Cardinal Beaton's Tower)	Monimail, Ladybank		56°18′50″N 3°08′09″W	16th-century tower house	15498	Upload another image See more images
St Monans Church and Churchyard	St Monans		56°12′11″N 2°46′16″W	14th-century church with 19th- and 20th-century alterations	15558	Upload another image See more images
Pitcairlie House	Near Lindores		56°19′16″N 3°13′58″W	16th-century tower house with 18th-century extensions	15565	Upload another image
Town Hall Steeple	Strathmiglo, High Street		56°16′41″N 3°16′10″W	18th-century steeple attached to later town hall	15754	Upload another image See more images
Pitlour House	Strathmiglo		56°17′10″N 3°16′45″W	18th-century house by Robert Mylne	15768	Upload Photo
Strathtyrum House	Strathtyrum, St Andrews		56°20′41″N 2°49′35″W	18th-century country house	15817	Upload Photo
Kenly Green House	Boarhills, Kingsbarns		56°18′52″N 2°41′59″W	Late-18th-century country house	15841	Upload Photo
Tulliallan Castle (Scottish Police College)	Kincardine		56°04′25″N 3°42′38″W	Castellated Gothic mansion, 1820, by William Atkinson	16585	Upload another image See more images
Balgonie Castle	Milton of Balgonie		56°11′38″N 3°06′34″W	Late-14th- and early-15th-century courtyard castle, with later additions	16664	Upload another image See more images
Balbirnie House	Glenrothes		56°12′34″N 3°08′46″W	Greek revival house by Richard Crichton, 1817	16687	Upload another image See more images
Durie House	Leven		56°12′43″N 3°00′43″W	Classical mansion of 1762	16699	Upload another image
Wemyss Castle	West Wemyss		56°08′40″N 3°04′52″W	Late-15th-century house with many later additions	16709	Upload another image See more images
Cunnoquhie former Stable Block	Letham		56°19′28″N 3°06′48″W	Early-19th-century classical stable block with clock tower	19749	Upload Photo
6-9 (inclusive Nos) Broomhill	Burntisland		56°03′36″N 3°14′06″W	Gothic semi-detached houses by F T Pilkington, dated 1858	22752	Upload Photo
Burntisland Parish Church	Burntisland, East Leven Street		56°03′29″N 3°13′57″W	Late-16th-century church, the first post-Reformation church built in Scotland	22777	Upload another image See more images
Crail Parish Church	Crail, Marketgate		56°15′46″N 2°37′33″W	Oldest parts c. 1160, tower c. 1200, later rebuilding	23244	Upload another image See more images
Crail Parish Churchyard Walls and Gravestones	Crail, Marketgate		56°15′46″N 2°37′31″W	Churchyard with mural monuments dating from 16th and 17th century	23245	Upload another image
Kirkmay House Hotel	Crail, Marketgate		56°15′43″N 2°37′33″W	Classical town house of 1817	23251	Upload another image
Friar's Court	Crail, Marketgate		56°15′42″N 2°37′32″W	17th-century town house	23253	Upload another image
The Tolbooth and Town Hall	Crail, Marketgate		56°15′39″N 2°37′34″W	16th-century tolbooth tower and 19th-century town hall	23287	Upload another image See more images
The Golf Hotel	Crail, High Street		56°15′38″N 2°37′36″W	Large 18th-century town house	23290	Upload another image See more images
35 Shoregate (The Custom House)	Crail		56°15′28″N 2°37′41″W	Late-17th-century warehouse	23378	Upload another image See more images
Crail Harbour	Crail		56°15′27″N 2°37′43″W	Medieval harbour with later rebuilding, west pier by Robert Stevenson, 1828	23398	Upload another image See more images
Priory Doocot, off Nethergate	Crail		56°15′41″N 2°37′18″W	16th-century circular dovecote	23445	Upload another image See more images
Culross Abbey Church	Culross		56°03′30″N 3°37′31″W	13th-century abbey church with many later additions	23960	Upload another image See more images
Culross Abbey House	Culross		56°03′30″N 3°37′28″W	Country house built 1608, with later developments, remodelled 1952 by Robert Hurd & Partners	23964	Upload another image
Culross Abbey House, Garden House	Culross		56°03′31″N 3°37′19″W	17th-century garden building	23965	Upload Photo
West Kirk Churchyard	Culross		56°03′37″N 3°38′25″W	Churchyard and boundary walls	23969	Upload another image See more images
Culross Palace	Culross	Not listed	56°03′20″N 3°37′52″W	Late-16th-century T-plan town house	23983	Upload another image See more images
Culross Town House	Culross		56°03′19″N 3°37′49″W	17th-century town hall with 18th-century clock tower	23994	Upload another image See more images
Culross Mercat Cross	Culross		56°03′20″N 3°37′42″W	16th-century market cross, shaft replaced 1902	24000	Upload another image See more images
Bishop Leighton's House	Culross, 5 Mid Causeway		56°03′19″N 3°37′43″W	Early-17th-century town house	24006	Upload Photo
The Study	Culross		56°03′21″N 3°37′43″W	Early-17th-century town house	24045	Upload another image
Old St Michael of Tarvit Parish Church	Cupar, Kirkgate		56°19′02″N 3°00′55″W	15th-century church with later additions	24136	Upload Photo
Preston Lodge	Cupar, 95 Bonnygate		56°19′10″N 3°01′00″W	17th-century townhouse	24242	Upload Photo
Goods Shed at Cupar railway station	Cupar, Station Road		56°19′08″N 3°00′26″W	Goods shed built 1847	24293	Upload Photo
Dunfermline Abbey, Nave	Dunfermline		56°04′12″N 3°27′50″W	12th-century abbey church, with later rebuilding	25960	Upload another image See more images
Dunfermline Abbey, New Abbey Parish Church	Dunfermline		56°04′12″N 3°27′50″W	Gothic Revival church by William Burn, 1821, adjoining abbey nave	25961	Upload another image
Pittencrieff Park, Pittencrieff House	Dunfermline		56°04′09″N 3°28′02″W	17th-century laird's house	25968	Upload another image See more images
Pittencrieff Park, Louise Carnegie Memorial Gateway	Dunfermline		56°04′16″N 3°27′59″W	Wrought-iron gates installed 1929	25972	Upload another image See more images
Dunfermline City Chambers	Dunfermline, Bridge Street		56°04′15″N 3°27′51″W	Baronial town hall by J C Walker, 1879	25973	Upload another image See more images
Abbot House	Dunfermline, Abbot Street		56°04′14″N 3°27′46″W	Later 16th-century town house, converted to heritage centre 1995	25978	Upload another image See more images
Former Guildhall	Dunfermline, High Street		56°04′16″N 3°27′41″W	Guildhall by Archibald Elliot, completed 1811	25999	Upload another image See more images
Hill House	Dunfermline, Limekilns Road		56°03′28″N 3°27′39″W	Earlier 17th-century laird's house	26050	Upload Photo
Pitreavie Castle	Dunfermline		56°02′54″N 3°25′06″W	Early-17th-century laird's house, extended 1885 by Charles Kinnear	26058	Upload another image See more images
Pilmuir Works	Dunfermline, Pilmuir Street		56°04′27″N 3°27′43″W	Textile factory, warehouses and offices by Thomas Hyslop Ure, 1883 to 1901	26073	Upload another image
Elie Castle	Elie, South Street		56°11′22″N 2°49′19″W	17th-century L-plan house	31029	Upload Photo
Moncrief House	Falkland, High Street		56°15′12″N 3°12′24″W	17th-century town house	31274	Upload another image
Falkland Town Hall	Falkland, High Street		56°15′11″N 3°12′27″W	Classical town hall by Thomas Barclay, 1800	31277	Upload another image See more images
Brunton House	Falkland, Brunton Street		56°15′09″N 3°12′29″W	Town house dated 1712	31328	Upload another image See more images
Inverkeithing Town House	Inverkeithing, Townhall Street		56°01′53″N 3°23′49″W	18th-century town hall	35087	Upload another image See more images
Inverkeithing Mercat Cross	Inverkeithing, Bank Street		56°01′51″N 3°23′51″W	16th-century market cross	35088	Upload another image See more images
Thomson's House	Inverkeithing, Bank Street		56°01′52″N 3°23′49″W	17th-century town house	35090	Upload another image See more images
The Friary	Inverkeithing, Queen Street		56°01′47″N 3°23′54″W	Part of 14th-century, remodelled as tenement in the 17th century and converted into a museum in the 1930s	35100	Upload another image See more images
Fordell's Lodging	Inverkeithing, Church Street		56°01′54″N 3°23′51″W	17th-century town house	35103	Upload another image See more images
Innergellie House	Kilrenny		56°14′11″N 2°41′15″W	Unusual 18th-century baroque house	36005	Upload another image
Anstruther Easter Parish Church (St Adrian's)	Anstruther Easter		56°13′27″N 2°42′02″W	17th-century T-plan church	36066	Upload another image See more images
The Manse	Anstruther Easter, Backdykes		56°13′24″N 2°41′53″W	Late-16th-century house, the oldest inhabited manse in Scotland	36072	Upload another image
Scottish Fisheries Museum	Anstruther Easter, Harbour Head		56°13′19″N 2°41′49″W	Group of commercial buildings dating from 16th to 19th centuries, a museum since 1970	36169	Upload another image See more images
Anstruther Wester Parish Church (now St Adrian's Church Hall)	Anstruther Wester		56°13′20″N 2°42′14″W	16th-century church	36191	Upload another image See more images
The White House	Anstruther Wester, 1 The Esplanade		56°13′19″N 2°42′11″W	18th-century townhouse	36197	Upload Photo
Bowbutts House	Kinghorn, Bruce Terrace		56°04′25″N 3°10′26″W	Late-18th-century townhouse	36267	Upload Photo
339–343 (Odd Nos) High Street	Kirkcaldy		56°06′49″N 3°09′16″W	17th-century townhouse	36354	Upload Photo
Sailor's Walk	Kirkcaldy, High Street		56°06′57″N 3°09′09″W	15th-century house, rebuilt in the 17th century. Said to be the oldest building in Kirkcaldy	36358	Upload another image See more images
Pathhead Medical Centre, Path House	Kirkcaldy, Nether Street		56°07′10″N 3°08′52″W	Late-17th-century house, renovated as a medical centre	36399	Upload another image See more images
Former Scottish Linoleum Works, South Factory (Nairn's Linoleum Works)	Kirkcaldy, Den Road	Not listed	56°07′21″N 3°09′00″W	Late-19th-century factory	36400	Upload Photo
Ravenscraig Park, Dovecot	Ravenscraig, Kirkcaldy		56°07′12″N 3°08′18″W	Late-16th-century beehive dovecot	36405	Upload another image See more images
Bay House	Dysart, Panhall		56°07′26″N 3°07′20″W	16th-century house, restored in 1969 as part of the National Trust for Scotland Little Houses Scheme	36407	Upload Photo
The Anchorage	Dysart, Shore Road		56°07′28″N 3°07′15″W	16th-century house, restored in the 1960s	36414	Upload Photo
St Serf's Kirk	Dysart, Panhall		56°07′27″N 3°07′19″W	Ruined church of circa 1500	36415	Upload another image
Dysart Tolbooth and Town Hall	Dysart, Victoria Street		56°07′34″N 3°07′16″W	16th-century municipal buildings, rebuilt in the 18th century	36418	Upload another image See more images
St David's	Dysart, Fitzroy Square		56°07′31″N 3°07′22″W	Late-16th-century townhouse	36425	Upload Photo
The Towers	Dysart, East Quality Street		56°07′36″N 3°07′23″W	16th-century house	36434	Upload Photo
Ladybank Station (Main West Block)	Ladybank		56°16′27″N 3°07′18″W	Mid 19th-century station in picturesque classical style	36925	Upload another image See more images
St Drostan's Parish Church	Markinch		56°12′18″N 3°08′03″W	18th-century church with Norman tower of circa 1200	37644	Upload another image See more images
Pittenweem Parish Church	Pittenweem, High Street		56°12′50″N 2°43′43″W	16th-century church	39868	Upload another image See more images
The Priory	Pittenweem, Marygate		56°12′49″N 2°43′40″W	16th-century and later buildings, now used as houses and town hall	39871	Upload Photo
The Priory, Gatehouse	Pittenweem		56°12′50″N 2°43′39″W	15th-century gatehouse	39872	Upload another image
Kellie Lodge	Pittenweem, High Street		56°12′48″N 2°43′47″W	16th-century townhouse, rebuilt in the 1960s	39905	Upload another image See more images
Gyles House	Pittenweem, The Gyles		56°12′45″N 2°43′34″W	17th-century sea-captain's house	39959	Upload another image See more images
4-6 The Gyles	Pittenweem		56°12′46″N 2°43′34″W	Late-16th-century townhouse	39961	Upload another image
18 East Shore	Pittenweem		56°12′46″N 2°43′41″W	Late-17th-century townhouse	39978	Upload Photo
St Andrews Cathedral	St Andrews		56°20′24″N 2°47′15″W	Ruin of 13th-century church	40585	Upload another image See more images
St Andrews Priory	St Andrews		56°20′22″N 2°47′15″W	Ruin of 13th-century monastery	40586	Upload Photo
St Andrews Cathedral Graveyard	St Andrews		56°20′23″N 2°47′12″W	Monuments of 16th century and later	40587	Upload another image See more images
St Rule's Church	St Andrews		56°20′23″N 2°47′11″W	Ruin of 11th or 12th-century church	40588	Upload another image See more images
St Andrews Cathedral Precinct Wall	St Andrews		56°20′21″N 2°47′14″W	14th-century walls with three gates and 13 towers	40589	Upload another image
The Pend	St Andrews, South Street		56°20′23″N 2°47′21″W	14th-century gatehouse	40590	Upload another image
St Andrews Harbour	St Andrews		56°20′22″N 2°47′01″W	Medieval pier and harbour, repeatedly rebuilt and expanded until the 19th century	40596	Upload another image See more images
The Roundel	St Andrews, South Street		56°20′24″N 2°47′22″W	16th and 17th-century townhouse	40600	Upload Photo
3 South Street	St Andrews		56°20′24″N 2°47′23″W	16th and 17th-century townhouse	40601	Upload Photo
67, 69 South Street	St Andrews		56°20′23″N 2°47′37″W	16th-century townhouse	40623	Upload Photo
71 South Street	St Andrews		56°20′23″N 2°47′37″W	16th or 17th-century townhouse	40624	Upload another image See more images
Holy Trinity Church	St Andrews, South Street		56°20′23″N 2°47′44″W	15th-century church	40633	Upload another image See more images
Queen Mary's House	St Andrews, South Street		56°20′22″N 2°47′24″W	16th-century townhouse	40662	Upload Photo
St Leonard's Chapel	St Andrews, South Street		56°20′21″N 2°47′23″W	Chapel circa 1200, rebuilt in the 16th century	40666	Upload Photo
South Court	St Andrews, South Street		56°20′21″N 2°47′31″W	15th to 17th-century townhouse	40676	Upload Photo
St Mary's College	St Andrews, South Street		56°20′21″N 2°47′41″W	16th-century college buildings	40686	Upload another image See more images
University Library Original Building	St Andrews, South Street		56°20′21″N 2°47′38″W	17th-century library	40687	Upload Photo
Madras College Main Building	St Andrews, South Street		56°20′16″N 2°47′52″W	College building of 1832 by William Burn	40703	Upload another image See more images
West Port (Southgait Port)	St Andrews		56°20′19″N 2°48′03″W	16th-century gatehouse	40723	Upload another image See more images
Dean's Court	St Andrews, North Street		56°20′25″N 2°47′22″W	Early-16th-century manse	40756	Upload Photo
71 North Street	St Andrews		56°20′29″N 2°47′38″W	15th-century and later townhouse	40770	Upload Photo
St Salvator's Chapel	St Andrews, North Street		56°20′29″N 2°47′39″W	15th-century church with later alterations	40771	Upload another image See more images
All Saint's Episcopal Church	St Andrews, North Castle Street		56°20′28″N 2°47′28″W	Early-20th-century Gothic church by John Douglas	40861	Upload another image See more images
11, 13 College Street	St Andrews		56°20′27″N 2°47′42″W	16th-century townhouse	40868	Upload Photo
Bogward Dovecot	St Andrews		56°19′48″N 2°49′24″W	16th-century beehive doocot	40932	Upload another image See more images
Beam-Engine House	Thornton		56°09′46″N 3°08′30″W	Early-19th-century classical engine house	42992	Upload Photo
East and West Battery Piers	North Queensferry, Battery Road		56°00′24″N 3°23′26″W	Early-19th-century piers by John Rennie the Elder	43862	Upload Photo
Blair Castle (Carlow Convalescent Home for Miners)	Culross		56°03′16″N 3°39′27″W	Early-18th-century country house in the style of Robert Adam	46425	Upload another image
Glassmount Conservatory	Glassmount House, Kinghorn		56°05′01″N 3°12′48″W	Late-19th-century glasshouses by Mackenzie & Moncur	46869	Upload Photo
Dunfermline Abbey, remains of Dorter and Reredorter ranges	Dunfermline	Delisted	56°04′10″N 3°27′48″W	Later 13th-century undercrofts	46894	Upload Photo
Dunfermline Abbey, remains of Frater range	Dunfermline	Delisted	56°04′10″N 3°27′50″W	Remains of earlier 14th-century refectory block	46895	Upload another image
Bishop Leighton's House	Culross, 7 Mid Causeway		56°03′19″N 3°37′44″W	Early-17th-century house	48815	Upload Photo
Forth Road Bridge	North Queensferry		56°00′06″N 3°24′15″W	Suspension bridge opened 1964	49165	Upload another image See more images
Easterheughs	Dalachy, Aberdour		56°03′37″N 3°16′11″W	Replica tower house, built in the 1950s by William Thomas, manager of Burntisland Aluminium Works	49686	Upload Photo
St Columba's Parish Church	Glenrothes, Church Street		56°11′43″N 3°10′43″W	Church of Scotland church by Wheeler & Sproson, completed 1962	49999	Upload another image See more images
Kincardine Bridge	Kincardine		56°03′55″N 3°43′38″W	Road bridge by Sir Alexander Gibb & Partners and James Miller, 1931	50078	Upload another image See more images
Crail Airfield, Technical Area, Air Ministry Laboratory Trainer Building, No 62357 09269	Crail		56°16′28″N 2°36′34″W	World War II-era bomber training building, possibly unique	50549	Upload Photo
Crail Airfield, Technical Area, Control Tower, No 62565 09048	Crail		56°16′21″N 2°36′22″W	World War II era control tower	50552	Upload another image
Crail Airfield, Technical Area, Engine And Aircraft Repair Shop, No 62507 09328	Crail		56°16′30″N 2°36′25″W	World War II era hangar	50557	Upload Photo
Crail Airfield, Technical Area, Torpedo Attack Training Building, No 62451 09377	Crail		56°16′31″N 2°36′29″W	World War II era training building, a rare example of its type	50573	Upload Photo
Andrew Melville Hall, University of St Andrews	North Haugh, St Andrews, Fife	18 November 2011	56°20′26″N 2°49′03″W	James Stirling	51846	Upload another image See more images

== See also ==
- Scheduled monuments in Fife
