= Gyles House =

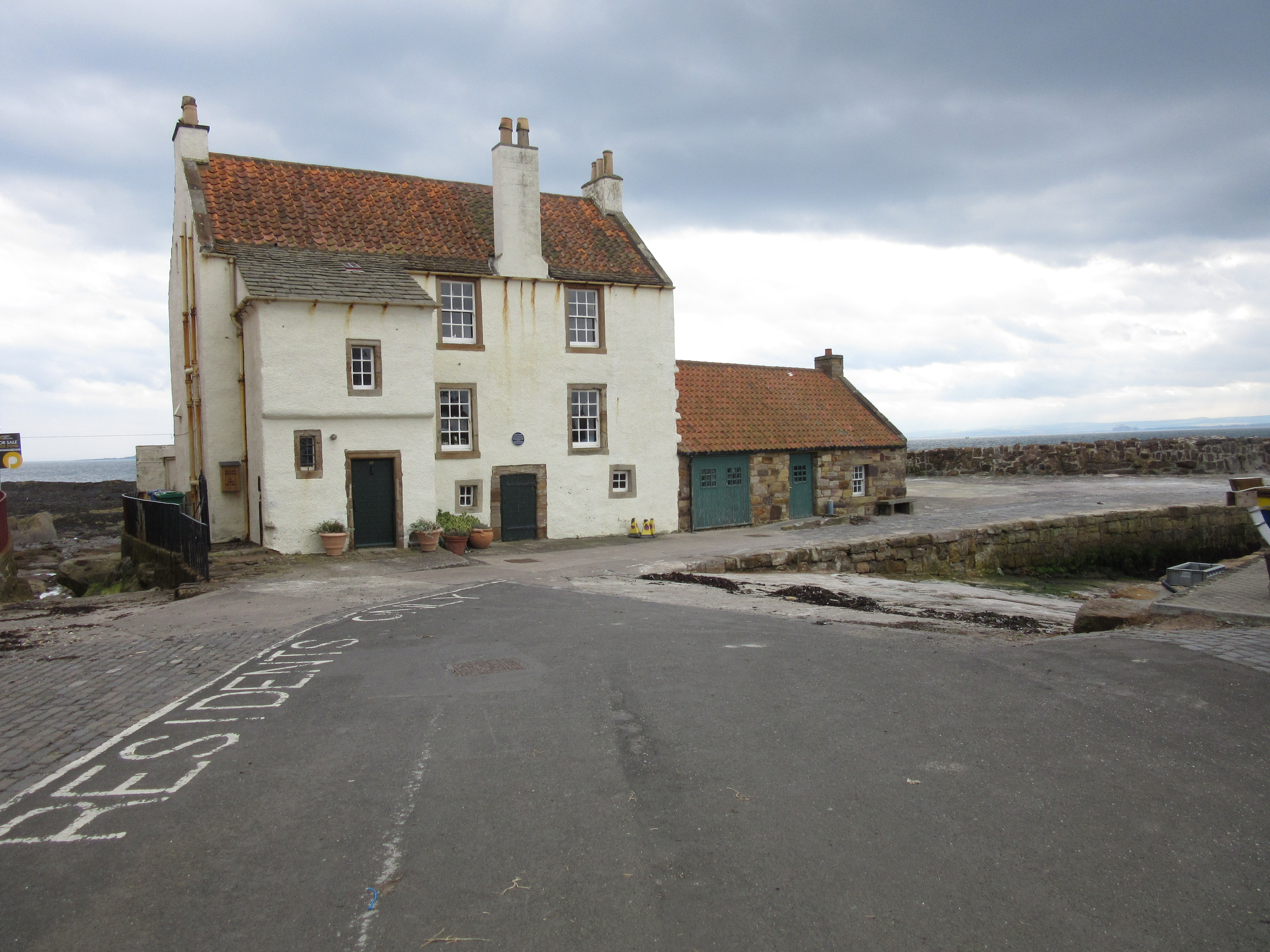
- The building in 2016
- Interactive map of the Gyles House area

General information
- Type: Residential
- Location: Pittenweem, Fife, Gyles, Scotland
- Coordinates: 56.212481°N 2.726071°W
- Opened: 1626 (400 years ago)

Gyles House is an historic building in Pittenweem, Fife, Scotland. Dating to 1626, it is a Category A listed building. It was formerly a sea captain's house.

== See also ==
- List of listed buildings in Pittenweem, Fife
- List of Category A listed buildings in Fife
