= Crail Parish Church =

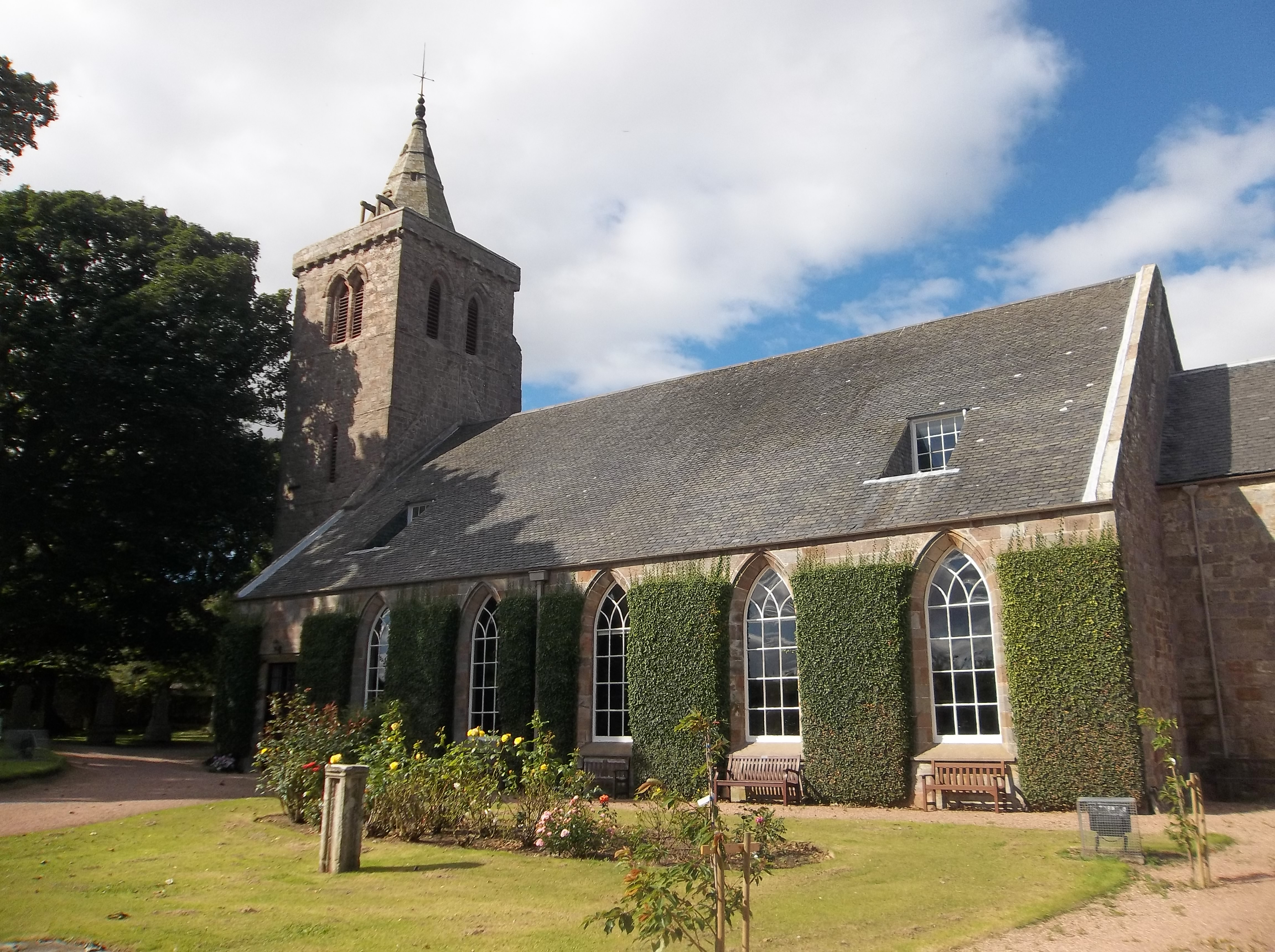
- The church in 2013, looking northwest
- Crail Parish Church
- 56°15′46″N 2°37′32″W
- Location: 5 Marketgate, Crail, Fife KY10 3TH
- Country: Scotland
- Denomination: Church of Scotland

Architecture
- Completed: 12th century remains, later additions and renovations

Crail Parish Church is an ancient church building in Crail, Fife, Scotland. It is Category A listed, its oldest part dating to the 12th century. The walls and gravestones of its kirkyard are also Category A listed.

In its first form, the church building consisted of an unaisled rectangular nave and chancel of Romanesque design. In the early 13th century, a western tower with small spire was added, and a double arcade of round pillars of variegated red sandstone in the nave. It was in this form, in 1243, that the church was dedicated to St Maelrubha by the Bishop of St Andrews. The side walls were rebuilt in Regency times, and the large pointed windows, filled with panes of clear glass held by astragals, rather than leads, allow light to flood into the interior. The church retains some 17th-century woodwork. The early Christian cross-slab is on display in the church: it is of unusual form (perhaps 10th century), formerly set in the floor.

John Knox, visiting Crail on his way to St Andrews in 1559, was moved to deliver a sermon in the church. Afterwards, protesters went through the church and forcefully removed images which were put in place by previous generations but were now considered ideologically unsound.

== Architectural history ==
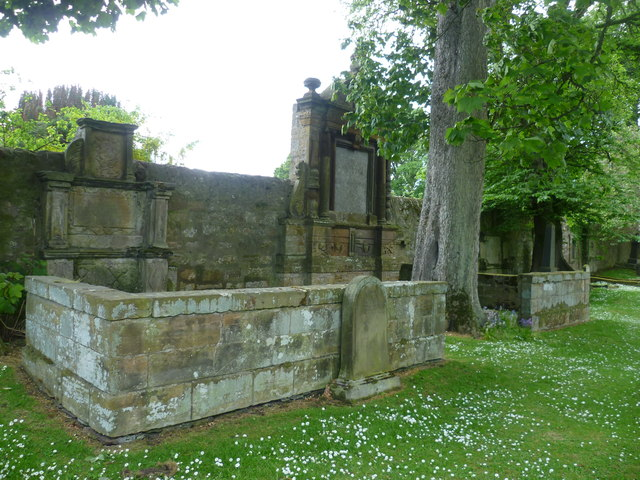
Tombs in the kirkyard

Remains of the c. 1160 chancel exist in the north wall and a fragment of the southwest wall. The west tower is slightly later, c. 1200, believed to have been free-standing originally but was designed as part of a plan for a rebuilt nave. This rebuild was begun c. 1120, containing an aisle of six bays with a clerestory and circular piers.

A belfry stage, corbelled parapet and a stone spire were added to the tower c. 1500.

A north side wall was rebuilt in the 18th century.

Robert Balfour (c. 1772–1867) reconstructed the nave in 1815, including a new south aisle wall. The north wall received new windows, and a continuous roof was placed over the nave.

In 1828, William Lees, of Pittenweem, rebuilt the gallery and refitted the chancel. It now contains a large organ.

From early in its history, the church belonged to the Cistercian nunnery of St Clare in Haddington, East Lothian, and remained the nunnery's possession until the Reformation.

== Kirkyard ==
The large kirkyard surrounding the building has a collection of monuments and stones dating from the late 16th century onwards and an unusual ornamented morthouse is present, once used to frustrate the activities of bodysnatchers. The kirkyard also includes a war memorial gateway of 1921.

== Gallery ==
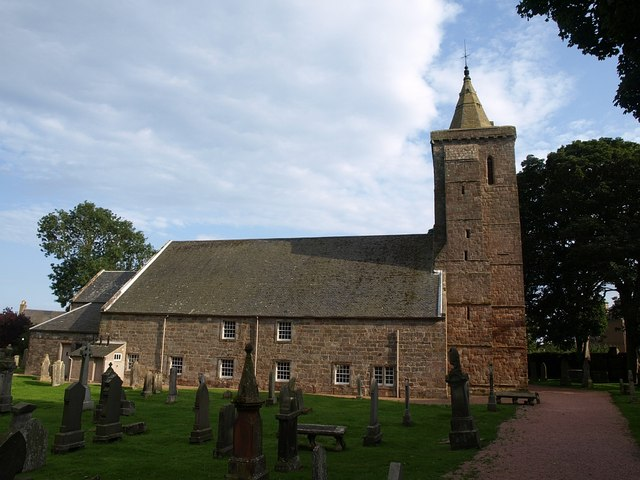
Kirkyard and northern side of the church

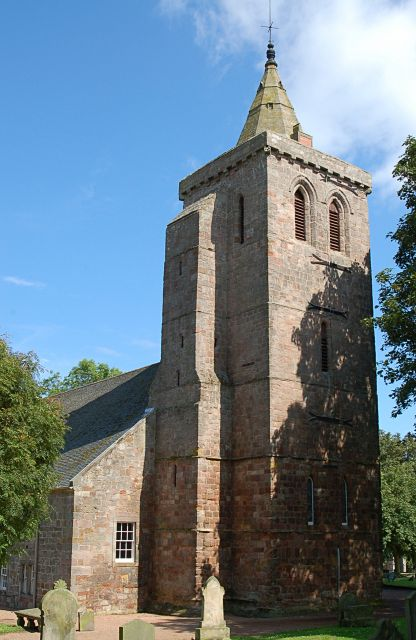
Detail of the northwest corner of the tower

== See also ==
- List of listed buildings in Crail, Fife
- List of Category A listed buildings in Fife
