= Thomas Martin Cappon =

Scottish architect (1863–1939)

- Born: 4 April 1863; Monifieth, Scotland
- Died: 26 January 1939 (aged 75); Dundee, Scotland
- Occupation: Architect
- Awards: FRIBA

Thomas Martin Cappon (4 April 1863 – 26 January 1939) was a Scottish architect. He designed several notable buildings in Scotland, including Lady Leng Memorial Chapel, which is now a Category A listed building.

== Early life ==
Cappon was born in Monifieth, Angus, Scotland, in 1863, to James Cappon and Janet Martin. His father was a shipmaster in Dundee.

He was educated at Newport Public School and the High School of Dundee, where he demonstrated an ability to draw. One of his classmates at the University of Dundee, meanwhile, was Sir Alfred Ewing.

== Career ==
Around 1880, aged 18, Cappon was articled to Charles and Leslie Ower. He was offered a job in the United States but instead opted to remain in Scotland, setting up his own architectural practice in Dundee. One of his first designs was St Mary's Episcopal Church in Newport-on-Tay.

== Personal life ==
Towards the end of the 19th century, Cappon was a senior captain in the First Volunteer Battalion of the Black Watch regiment.

In 1898, he was elected president of the Dundee Institute of Architecture, Science and Art, and was involved in establishing a school of architecture at Dundee Technical College. He was also admitted as a Fellow of the Royal Institute of British Architects.

Early in 1900, Cappon's busy life began to take its toll on his body. On medical advice, he departed for Durban, South Africa, in March 1900, touring for three months the battlefields of the South African Wars. He studied their military hospitals and their equipment. Upon his return to Dundee, he discovered his practice had been underperforming. He downsized the business, focusing on large suburban houses.

During World War I, Cappon was a recruiting officer in Dundee, and was given the rank of major.

He retired from practicing architecture in 1929, and sold his business to Joseph Johnston.

In 1935, Cappon published his memoirs, which focussed on his role in public life, rather than his professional career.

== Death ==
Cappon died at his home in Dundee, The Shieling, in 1939. He was 75. He was interred at Balgay.
