= Crail Custom House =

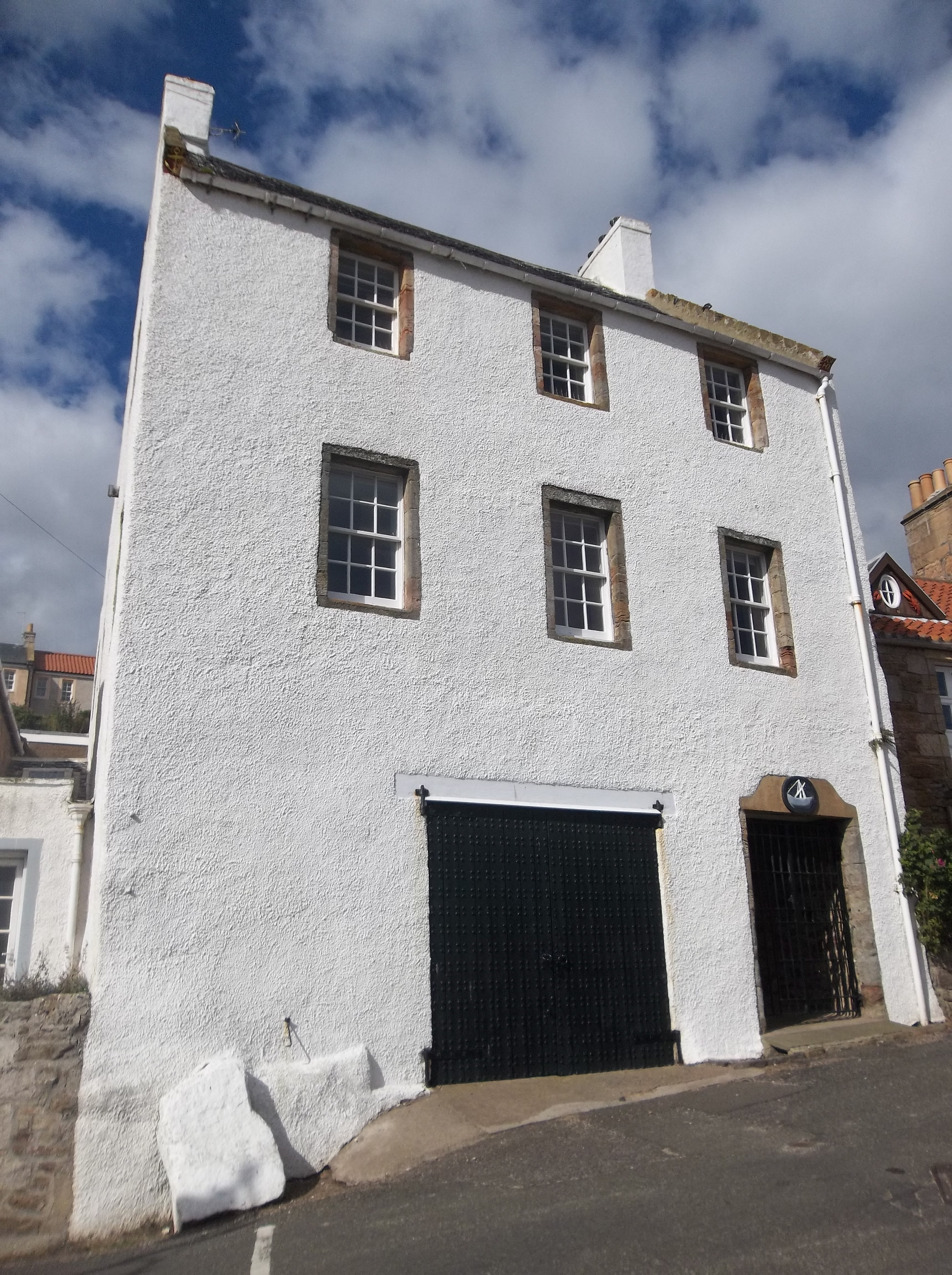
- The building in 2013
- Interactive map of the Crail Custom House area

General information
- Type: Custom house
- Location: Crail, Fife, 35 Shoregate, Scotland
- Coordinates: 56.25776°N 2.628046°W
- Opened: late 17th century

Crail Custom House is an historic building in Crail, Fife, Scotland. Dating to the late 17th century, it is a Category A listed building.

Inscriptions on the buildings eastern and western skewputts reference Robert Wood (a ship captain) and Helen Daw.

== Gallery ==
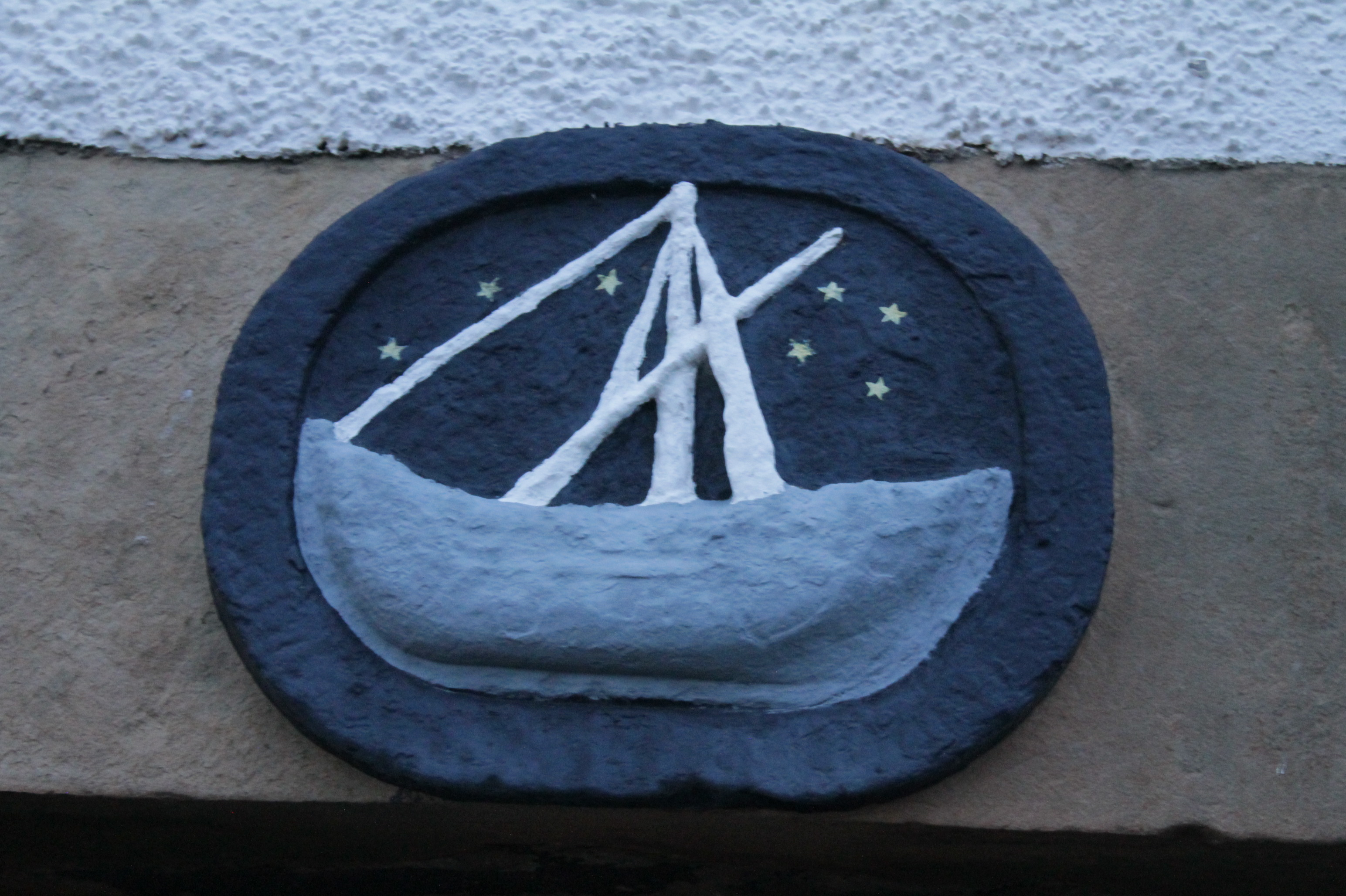
Ursa Major representing navigation, shown on a carved stone, located above the main door

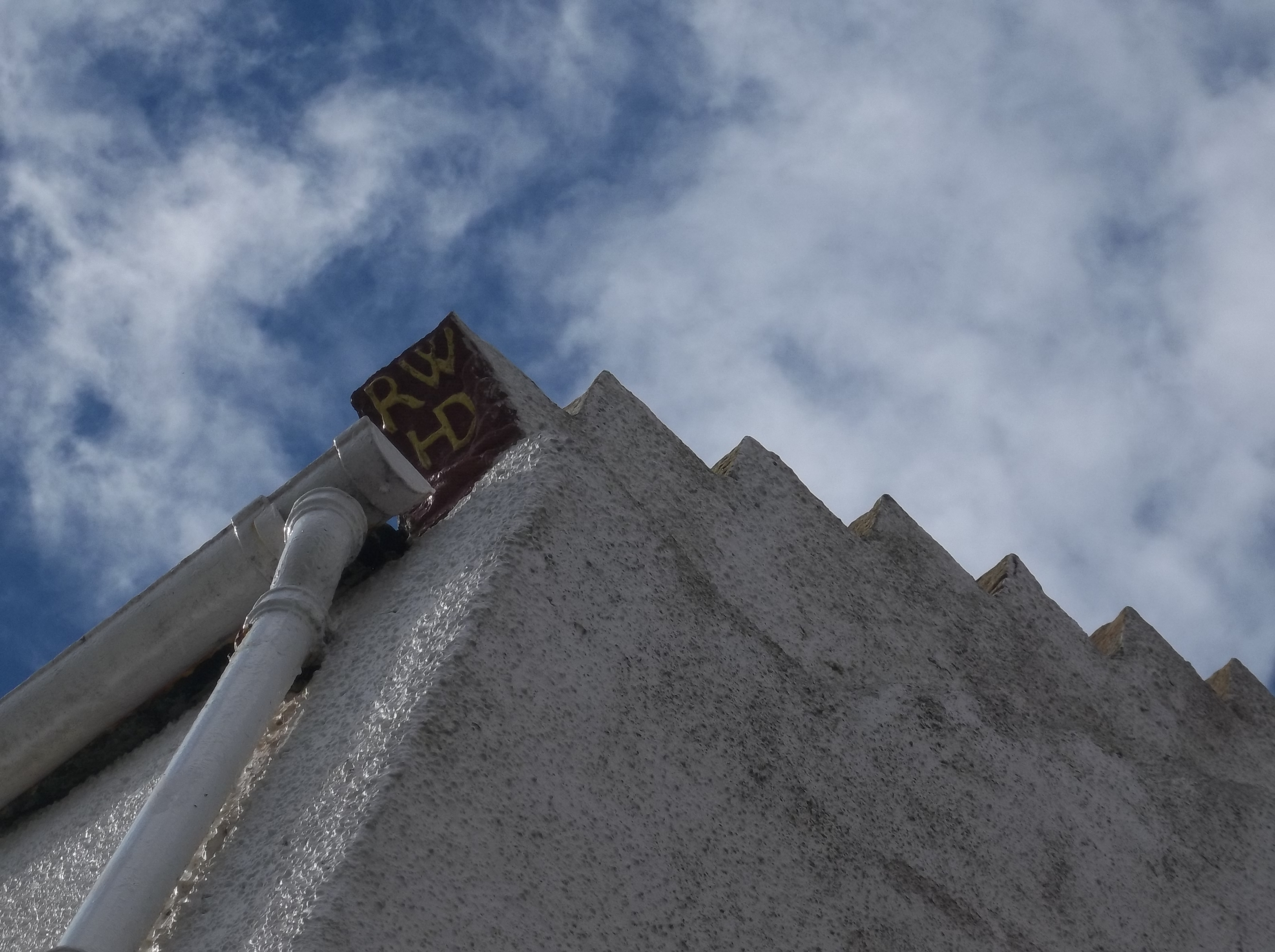
Inscription in the eastern skewputt. An inscription on the western skewputt has the initials "HP" and an anchor

== See also ==
- List of listed buildings in Crail, Fife
- List of Category A listed buildings in Fife
