= List of listed buildings in Pittenweem, Fife =

This is a list of listed buildings in the parish of Pittenweem in Fife, Scotland.

== List ==
Name	Location	Date listed	Grid ref. (Note: Sometimes known as OSGB36, the grid reference (where provided) is based on the British national grid reference system used by the Ordnance Survey. • "Guide to National Grid". Ordnance Survey. • "Get-a-map". Ordnance Survey.)	Geo-coordinates	Notes	LB number (Note: Historic Environment Scotland assign a unique alphanumeric identifier to each designated site in Scotland, for listed buildings this always begins with "LB", for example "LB12345".)	Image
17, 18 Bruce's Wynd				56°12′45″N 2°43′48″W	Category C(S)	40029	Upload Photo
3 Calman's Wynd The Haven				56°12′44″N 2°43′53″W	Category C(S)	40030	Upload Photo
4 West Shore				56°12′43″N 2°43′57″W	Category C(S)	40039	Upload Photo
9 West Shore				56°12′44″N 2°43′59″W	Category B	40042	Upload Photo
Retaining Wall To Houses 1-19 West Shore				56°12′44″N 2°43′58″W	Category B	40049	Upload Photo
3 James Street				56°12′51″N 2°43′53″W	Category C(S)	40053	Upload Photo
1 And 3 Charles Street				56°12′50″N 2°43′53″W	Category C(S)	40055	Upload Photo
Seaforth Charles Street				56°12′50″N 2°43′54″W	Category C(S)	40057	Upload Photo
10 Charles Street (Northern Section)				56°12′51″N 2°43′56″W	Category C(S)	40058	Upload Photo
26 Charles Street				56°12′54″N 2°43′59″W	Category B	40062	Upload Photo
3 Cove Wynd, Including Outhouse				56°12′47″N 2°43′38″W	Category C(S)	40065	Upload Photo
19, 21 High Street				56°12′49″N 2°43′47″W	Category B	39904	Upload Photo
31-39 High Street				56°12′48″N 2°43′48″W	Category B	39907	Upload Photo
50 High Street				56°12′46″N 2°43′52″W	Category B	39930	Upload Photo
Grange Cottage West Wynd				56°12′45″N 2°43′56″W	Category C(S)	39938	Upload Photo
38 Abbey Wall Road Anchor House				56°12′47″N 2°43′33″W	Category B	39965	Upload Photo
7 Water Wynd				56°12′47″N 2°43′43″W	Category B	39984	Upload Photo
27 Mid Shore				56°12′43″N 2°43′49″W	Category C(S)	40004	Upload Photo
30 And 31 Mid Shore And 1 And 2 Bruce's Wynd				56°12′43″N 2°43′51″W	Category B	40006	Upload Photo
Pittenweem Harbour				56°12′43″N 2°43′39″W	Category B	40015	Upload another image
Baptist Church, School Wynd				56°12′45″N 2°43′47″W	Category C(S)	40017	Upload Photo
10 Bruce's Wynd				56°12′45″N 2°43′51″W	Category C(S)	40024	Upload Photo
Parish Church Manse Including Offices And Wall To Milton Place, Milton Place				56°12′55″N 2°43′30″W	Category B	39874	Upload Photo
Roman Catholic Church Enclosing Wall And Entrance Gatepiers				56°12′55″N 2°43′31″W	Category C(S)	39876	Upload Photo
Milton Lodge (Former Lodge Of Above) Milton Place				56°12′55″N 2°43′32″W	Category C(S)	39877	Upload Photo
The Hermitage Including Garden Wall, Milton Road				56°12′57″N 2°43′33″W	Category C(S)	39881	Upload Photo
Corner Bar At Corner Of James Street And Marygate				56°12′54″N 2°43′35″W	Category C(S)	39883	Upload Photo
Sunnybrae Bruce's Wynd				56°12′45″N 2°43′49″W	Category C(S)	40028	Upload Photo
2 West Shore				56°12′43″N 2°43′56″W	Category C(S)	40037	Upload Photo
5 West Shore				56°12′44″N 2°43′57″W	Category C(S)	40040	Upload Photo
18 Charles Street				56°12′53″N 2°43′58″W	Category C(S)	40060	Upload Photo
Station Hotel Charles Street, Including Front Wall And Gatepiers				56°12′56″N 2°44′02″W	Category B	40063	Upload Photo
Grangemuir Bridge Over Dreel Burn				56°13′15″N 2°44′19″W	Category B	40064	Upload Photo
Kirkgate House Kirkgate				56°12′50″N 2°43′44″W	Category C(S)	39897	Upload Photo
Kellie Lodge, 23 High Street				56°12′48″N 2°43′47″W	Category A	39905	Upload another image See more images
41 High Street				56°12′47″N 2°43′49″W	Category C(S)	39908	Upload Photo
43 High Street				56°12′47″N 2°43′50″W	Category C(S)	39910	Upload Photo
18 High Street				56°12′48″N 2°43′46″W	Category C(S)	39918	Upload Photo
22 High Street				56°12′48″N 2°43′46″W	Category C(S)	39920	Upload Photo
2 & 3 Market Place				56°12′47″N 2°43′47″W	Category B	39922	Upload Photo
6, 7 & 8 Market Place				56°12′46″N 2°43′48″W	Category B	39924	Upload Photo
54 High Street House				56°12′46″N 2°43′53″W	Category B	39933	Upload Photo
1 West Wynd				56°12′45″N 2°43′55″W	Category C(S)	39937	Upload Photo
1 South Loan				56°12′48″N 2°43′52″W	Category B	39939	Upload Photo
10 South Loan				56°12′48″N 2°43′53″W	Category C(S)	39944	Upload Photo
16 South Loan				56°12′48″N 2°43′54″W	Category C(S)	39947	Upload Photo
22, 24 South Loan				56°12′49″N 2°43′55″W	Category C(S)	39949	Upload Photo
30 South Loan				56°12′50″N 2°43′56″W	Category C(S)	39952	Upload Photo
7 The Gyles				56°12′46″N 2°43′34″W	Category B	39962	Upload Photo
12 East Shore				56°12′47″N 2°43′39″W	Category C(S)	39975	Upload Photo
10 Water Wynd				56°12′47″N 2°43′45″W	Category C(S)	39987	Upload Photo
3 Mid Shore				56°12′45″N 2°43′43″W	Category C(S)	39990	Upload Photo
8-10 Mid Shore				56°12′44″N 2°43′45″W	Category C(S)	39994	Upload Photo
Rockvilla Mid Shore				56°12′42″N 2°43′55″W	Category B	40014	Upload Photo
Henderson House, School Wynd Including Garden Wall				56°12′46″N 2°43′48″W	Category B	40018	Upload Photo
12 Bruce's Wynd Seaward House				56°12′45″N 2°43′50″W	Category C(S)	40026	Upload Photo
4 And 6 Calman's Wynd				56°12′44″N 2°43′53″W	Category B	40034	Upload Photo
1 James Street And 5 Charles Street				56°12′50″N 2°43′53″W	Category B	40054	Upload Photo
22 Charles Street				56°12′53″N 2°43′59″W	Category C(S)	40061	Upload Photo
22 Marygate Carradale				56°12′54″N 2°43′35″W	Category C(S)	39891	Upload Photo
Edina Cottage Routine Row				56°12′51″N 2°43′45″W	Category C(S)	39892	Upload Photo
Kirkgate At Corner Of Routine Row (Mr Baird)				56°12′51″N 2°43′45″W	Category C(S)	39894	Upload Photo
Le Marne, Kirkgate				56°12′50″N 2°43′45″W	Category C(S)	39896	Upload Photo
15 High Street				56°12′49″N 2°43′46″W	Category C(S)	39902	Upload Photo
17 High Street				56°12′49″N 2°43′46″W	Category B	39903	Upload Photo
27 And 29 High Street				56°12′48″N 2°43′48″W	Category B	39906	Upload Photo
59 High Street				56°12′46″N 2°43′53″W	Category C(S)	39914	Upload Photo
44 High Street				56°12′46″N 2°43′52″W	Category B	39928	Upload Photo
52 High Street Showroom And Store				56°12′46″N 2°43′53″W	Category C(S)	39931	Upload Photo
60 High Street				56°12′46″N 2°43′55″W	Category C(S)	39936	Upload Photo
6 South Loan				56°12′47″N 2°43′52″W	Category B	39942	Upload Photo
20 South Loan				56°12′49″N 2°43′55″W	Category C(S)	39948	Upload Photo
10 & 11 Cove Wyne, Including Garden Wall To Wynd				56°12′48″N 2°43′40″W	Category C(S)	39957	Upload Photo
48 Abbey Wall Road				56°12′47″N 2°43′35″W	Category C(S)	39963	Upload Photo
46 Abbey Wall Road				56°12′47″N 2°43′34″W	Category C(S)	39964	Upload Photo
18 East Shore				56°12′46″N 2°43′41″W	Category A	39978	Upload Photo
5 Water Wynd				56°12′46″N 2°43′43″W	Category B	39983	Upload Photo
8 Water Wynd				56°12′47″N 2°43′43″W	Category B	39985	Upload Photo
15, 16, 17 Mid Shore				56°12′44″N 2°43′46″W	Category C(S)	39997	Upload Photo
22 And 23 Mid Shore				56°12′43″N 2°43′48″W	Category C(S)	40001	Upload Photo
28 And 29 Mid Shore				56°12′43″N 2°43′50″W	Category C(S)	40005	Upload Photo
36 Mid Shore St Clair				56°12′43″N 2°43′53″W	Category C(S)	40010	Upload Photo
38 And 39 Mid Shore				56°12′43″N 2°43′54″W	Category C(S)	40012	Upload Photo
The Crow's Nest School Wynd				56°12′45″N 2°43′48″W	Category C(S)	40019	Upload Photo
4, 5, 6 Bruce's Wynd				56°12′44″N 2°43′51″W	Category C(S)	40022	Upload Photo
The Priory Including North Courtyard Wall And Retaining Walls To Cove Wynd				56°12′49″N 2°43′40″W	Category A	39871	Upload Photo
The Priory - Gatehouse				56°12′50″N 2°43′39″W	Category A	39872	Upload another image
3 Routine Row				56°12′51″N 2°43′45″W	Category C(S)	50055	Upload Photo
13 Bruce's Wynd Tigh Na Mara				56°12′45″N 2°43′49″W	Category C(S)	40027	Upload Photo
House (Mr Legget) Calman's Wynd				56°12′43″N 2°43′52″W	Category C(S)	40031	Upload Photo
17 Charles Street And 1-3 Session St				56°12′53″N 2°43′56″W	Category C(S)	40056	Upload Photo
Clydesdale Bank, 1 High Street And Bank House, Kirkgate				56°12′50″N 2°43′44″W	Category B	39898	Upload Photo
49 High Street Royal Bank Of Scotland				56°12′47″N 2°43′51″W	Category C(S)	39912	Upload Photo
51 And 53 High Street, Corner Of South Loan				56°12′47″N 2°43′52″W	Category C(S)	39913	Upload Photo
61 High Street				56°12′46″N 2°43′54″W	Category C(S)	39915	Upload Photo
4-8 High Street				56°12′49″N 2°43′44″W	Category B	39917	Upload Photo
20 High Street				56°12′48″N 2°43′46″W	Category C(S)	39919	Upload Photo
Bankview, At Rear Of Lawson's 34, 36 Market Place				56°12′46″N 2°43′50″W	Category B	39925	Upload Photo
42 High Street				56°12′46″N 2°43′50″W	Category C(S)	39927	Upload Photo
54 High Street Warehouse				56°12′46″N 2°43′53″W	Category C(S)	39932	Upload Photo
58 High Street Including Garden Wall To Calman's Wynd				56°12′46″N 2°43′55″W	Category B	39935	Upload Photo
2 Backgate, Corner Of South Loan				56°12′48″N 2°43′52″W	Category C(S)	39941	Upload Photo
8 Cove Wynd				56°12′48″N 2°43′40″W	Category B	39955	Upload Photo
Priorsgate Cove Wynd Including Garden Wall To Wynd				56°12′49″N 2°43′42″W	Category C(S)	39958	Upload Photo
9 And 10 Abbey Wall Road				56°12′46″N 2°43′34″W	Category C(S)	39966	Upload Photo
20 East Shore				56°12′46″N 2°43′41″W	Category C(S)	39979	Upload Photo
22 East Shore				56°12′46″N 2°43′42″W	Category C(S)	39980	Upload Photo
5 Mid Shore And 3 School Wynd				56°12′45″N 2°43′44″W	Category B	39992	Upload Photo
7 Mid Shore, Larachmhor, And 1 School Wynd				56°12′45″N 2°43′44″W	Category C(S)	39993	Upload Photo
11, 12 Mid Shore				56°12′44″N 2°43′46″W	Category B	39995	Upload Photo
19 Mid Shore, Heraean				56°12′43″N 2°43′47″W	Category C(S)	39999	Upload Photo
House (Lawson) School Wynd				56°12′46″N 2°43′48″W	Category C(S)	40020	Upload Photo
House (Methvyn) School Wynd, Corner Of Market Place				56°12′46″N 2°43′49″W	Category B	40021	Upload Photo
St Margaret's Milton Place, Corner Of James Street				56°12′55″N 2°43′34″W	Category C(S)	39878	Upload Photo
St Margaret's Farm Buildings Corner Of Milton Place, Milton Place, Milton Road And James Street				56°12′55″N 2°43′34″W	Category C(S)	39879	Upload Photo
1 West Shore Including Garage And Gear Shed				56°12′43″N 2°43′56″W	Category B	40036	Upload Photo
14 West Shore				56°12′44″N 2°44′00″W	Category B	40045	Upload Photo
15 West Shore				56°12′44″N 2°44′00″W	Category C(S)	40046	Upload Photo
16 West Shore				56°12′44″N 2°44′01″W	Category B	40047	Upload another image
17, 18, 19 West Shore				56°12′44″N 2°44′02″W	Category B	40048	Upload Photo
27 James Street Including Front Area Wall				56°12′52″N 2°43′44″W	Category B	40052	Upload Photo
Cosy Cottage, Charles Street				56°12′52″N 2°43′57″W	Category C(S)	40059	Upload Photo
19 & 20 Marygate				56°12′53″N 2°43′36″W	Category C(S)	39889	Upload Photo
21 Marygate				56°12′54″N 2°43′36″W	Category C(S)	39890	Upload Photo
House (Mr Mcqueen) Adjoining Le Marne On North Kirkgate				56°12′50″N 2°43′45″W	Category C(S)	39895	Upload Photo
2 High Street				56°12′49″N 2°43′43″W	Category B	39916	Upload Photo
46 & 48 High Street				56°12′46″N 2°43′52″W	Category B	39929	Upload Photo
3, 5 South Loan				56°12′48″N 2°43′52″W	Category B	39940	Upload Photo
12 South Loan				56°12′48″N 2°43′53″W	Category C(S)	39945	Upload Photo
4 And 5 East Shore				56°12′47″N 2°43′36″W	Category B	39970	Upload Photo
10 East Shore And 1 Cove Wynd				56°12′47″N 2°43′38″W	Category C(S)	39973	Upload Photo
11 East Shore				56°12′47″N 2°43′39″W	Category C(S)	39974	Upload Photo
3 Water Wynd Setonville				56°12′46″N 2°43′42″W	Category C(S)	39982	Upload Photo
40 Mid Shore The Thill				56°12′43″N 2°43′54″W	Category C(S)	40013	Upload Photo
7, 9 Bruce's Wynd				56°12′44″N 2°43′51″W	Category C(S)	40023	Upload Photo
Churchyard Walls And Gravestones				56°12′50″N 2°43′42″W	Category B	39870	Upload Photo
Roman Catholic Church, Milton Place				56°12′57″N 2°43′30″W	Category C(S)	39875	Upload Photo
16 & 17 Marygate				56°12′53″N 2°43′37″W	Category C(S)	39887	Upload Photo
18 Marygate				56°12′53″N 2°43′37″W	Category C(S)	39888	Upload Photo
11 Bruce's Wynd				56°12′45″N 2°43′50″W	Category B	40025	Upload Photo
2 Calman's Wynd				56°12′43″N 2°43′53″W	Category B	40033	Upload Photo
8 Calman's Wynd				56°12′44″N 2°43′54″W	Category B	40035	Upload Photo
6 And 7 West Shore				56°12′44″N 2°43′57″W	Category B	40041	Upload Photo
5 High Street				56°12′49″N 2°43′44″W	Category C(S)	39899	Upload Photo
11 & 13 High Street				56°12′49″N 2°43′45″W	Category B	39901	Upload Photo
26 High Street And 1 Market Place				56°12′47″N 2°43′47″W	Category B	39921	Upload Photo
4 & 5 Market Place Including Outbuilding At Rear				56°12′46″N 2°43′48″W	Category B	39923	Upload Photo
56 High Street				56°12′45″N 2°43′54″W	Category C(S)	39934	Upload Photo
14 South Loan				56°12′48″N 2°43′53″W	Category C(S)	39946	Upload Photo
26 South Loan				56°12′49″N 2°43′55″W	Category C(S)	39950	Upload Photo
7 Cove Wynd				56°12′47″N 2°43′39″W	Category C(S)	39954	Upload Photo
Gyles House				56°12′45″N 2°43′34″W	Category A	39959	Upload another image
Outbuildings Of 1 And 2 East Shore				56°12′47″N 2°43′35″W	Category C(S)	39969	Upload Photo
House And Garages Within Court At 5 East Shore				56°12′47″N 2°43′36″W	Category C(S)	39971	Upload Photo
7 And 8 East Shore				56°12′47″N 2°43′37″W	Category B	39972	Upload Photo
23 East Shore And 1 Water Wynd				56°12′46″N 2°43′42″W	Category C(S)	39981	Upload Photo
4 Mid Shore				56°12′45″N 2°43′44″W	Category B	39991	Upload Photo
18 Mid Shore Kilnamara				56°12′44″N 2°43′47″W	Category C(S)	39998	Upload Photo
32, 33 Mid Shore				56°12′43″N 2°43′52″W	Category C(S)	40007	Upload Photo
The Harbour Granary				56°12′44″N 2°43′43″W	Category B	40016	Upload Photo
15 Marygate				56°12′52″N 2°43′39″W	Category C(S)	39886	Upload Photo
Houses (Miss Wilson) Calman's Wynd				56°12′45″N 2°43′54″W	Category C(S)	40032	Upload Photo
3 West Shore Craig Ard				56°12′43″N 2°43′56″W	Category C(S)	40038	Upload Photo
11 West Shore				56°12′44″N 2°43′59″W	Category C(S)	40043	Upload another image
12 West Shore				56°12′44″N 2°44′00″W	Category B	40044	Upload Photo
Murrayfield House James Street				56°12′54″N 2°43′43″W	Category B	40050	Upload Photo
40 High Street				56°12′46″N 2°43′51″W	Category B	39926	Upload Photo
1 And 2 East Shore				56°12′47″N 2°43′35″W	Category C(S)	39968	Upload Photo
13 And 14 East Shore				56°12′47″N 2°43′39″W	Category C(S)	39976	Upload Photo
11 Water Wynd Including Garden Wall To Wynd				56°12′48″N 2°43′44″W	Category B	39986	Upload Photo
24 And 25 Mid Shore Thistle House				56°12′43″N 2°43′48″W	Category C(S)	40002	Upload Photo
26 Mid Shore				56°12′43″N 2°43′49″W	Category C(S)	40003	Upload Photo
34, 35 Mid Shore				56°12′43″N 2°43′52″W	Category B	40009	Upload Photo
37 Mid Shore				56°12′43″N 2°43′53″W	Category C(S)	40011	Upload Photo
Pittenweem Parish Church				56°12′50″N 2°43′43″W	Category A	39868	Upload another image
Abbey Lodge Corner Marygate, Milton Place And Abbey Wall Road, Including Garden Wall				56°12′54″N 2°43′33″W	Category C(S)	39880	Upload Photo
12, 13 Marygate				56°12′52″N 2°43′40″W	Category C(S)	39884	Upload Photo
14 Marygate				56°12′52″N 2°43′40″W	Category C(S)	39885	Upload Photo
Church Of Scotland Hall Including Front Wall And Gatepiers James Street				56°12′53″N 2°43′46″W	Category B	40051	Upload Photo
7 & 9 High Street				56°12′49″N 2°43′45″W	Category C(S)	39900	Upload Photo
House In Brown's Close, Adjoining Old Golf Tavern, And British Legion Building At Rear				56°12′48″N 2°43′50″W	Category B	39909	Upload Photo
49 High Street Town Clerk's Office Including Garden Wall To South Loan				56°12′47″N 2°43′50″W	Category C(S)	39911	Upload Photo
8 South Loan Including Garden Wall To South Loan				56°12′47″N 2°43′52″W	Category C(S)	39943	Upload Photo
28 South Loan				56°12′49″N 2°43′56″W	Category C(S)	39951	Upload Photo
32 South Loan				56°12′50″N 2°43′57″W	Category C(S)	39953	Upload Photo
9 Cove Wynd				56°12′48″N 2°43′40″W	Category B	39956	Upload Photo
3 The Gyles				56°12′46″N 2°43′35″W	Category B	39960	Upload Photo
4-6 The Gyles				56°12′46″N 2°43′34″W	Category A	39961	Upload another image
Rovers' Warehouse, Abbey Wall Road (Next To No 9 And 10 Abbey Wall Road To North-East)				56°12′46″N 2°43′33″W	Category B	39967	Upload Photo
16 East Shore				56°12′47″N 2°43′40″W	Category C(S)	39977	Upload Photo
12 Water Wynd				56°12′48″N 2°43′45″W	Category B	39988	Upload Photo
1 And 2 Mid Shore And Water Wynd				56°12′45″N 2°43′43″W	Category C(S)	39989	Upload Photo
14 Mid Shore				56°12′44″N 2°43′46″W	Category C(S)	39996	Upload Photo
21 Mid Shore, Elim And The Forth				56°12′43″N 2°43′47″W	Category C(S)	40000	Upload Photo
1 Gascon's Close Mid Shore				56°12′44″N 2°43′51″W	Category C(S)	40008	Upload Photo
Market Cross, At Tower Of Parish Church				56°12′50″N 2°43′43″W	Category B	39869	Upload Photo
The Priory - St Fillan's Cave				56°12′48″N 2°43′39″W	Category B	39873	Upload Photo
St John's Episcopal Church, Marygate				56°12′51″N 2°43′40″W	Category B	39882	Upload Photo
James Street, Pittenweem Primary School Including Ancillary Structures, Gate Piers And Boundary Walls				56°12′54″N 2°43′50″W	Category B	49885	Upload Photo

== Key ==
The scheme for classifying buildings in Scotland is:

- Category A: "buildings of national or international importance, either architectural or historic; or fine, little-altered examples of some particular period, style or building type."
- Category B: "buildings of regional or more than local importance; or major examples of some particular period, style or building type, which may have been altered."
- Category C: "buildings of local importance; lesser examples of any period, style, or building type, as originally constructed or moderately altered; and simple traditional buildings which group well with other listed buildings."

In March 2016 there were 47,288 listed buildings in Scotland. Of these, 8% were Category A, and 50% were Category B, with the remaining 42% being Category C.

== See also ==
- List of listed buildings in Fife
