= Kellie Lodge =

Building in Scotland

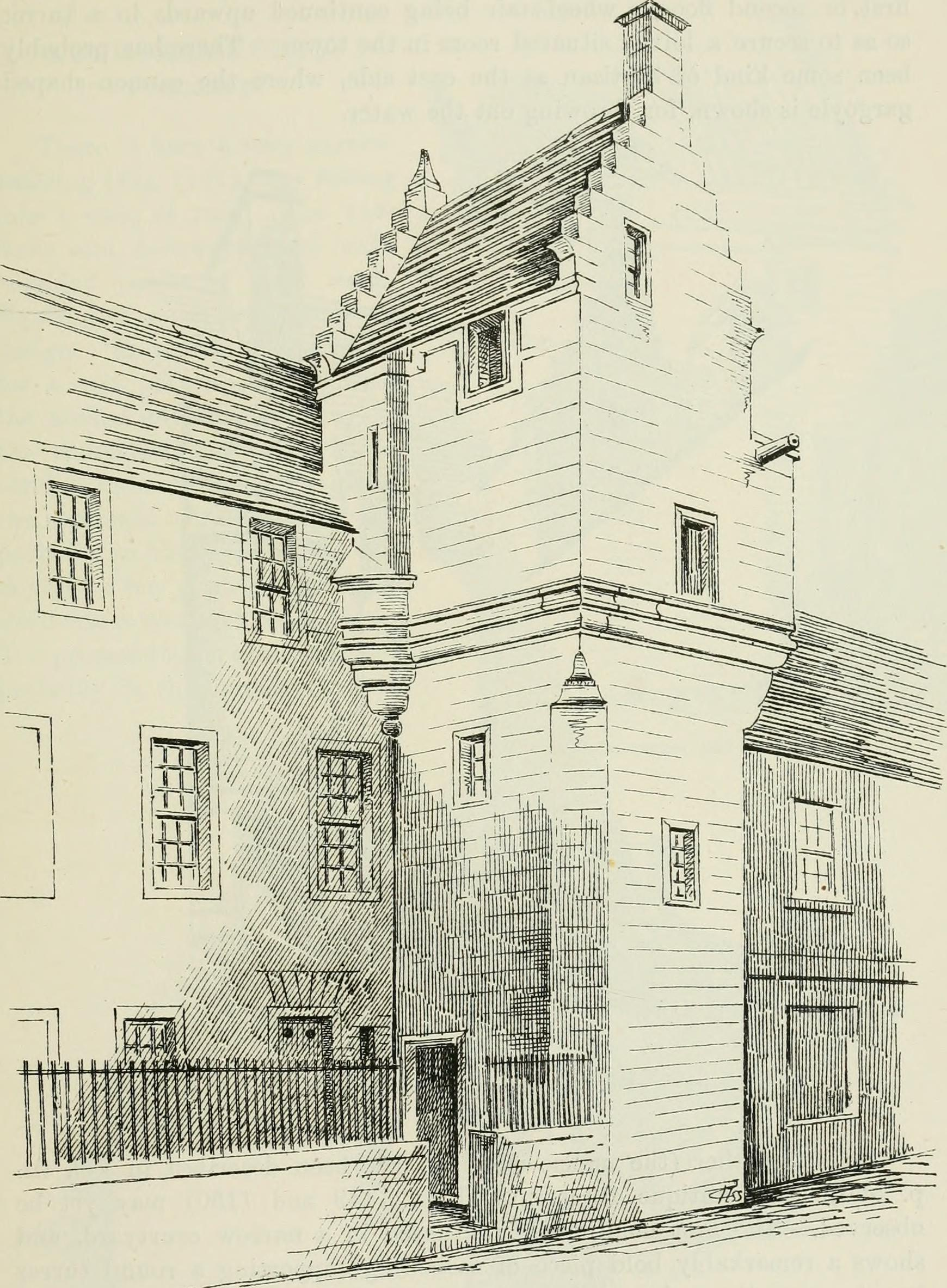
- The lodge in the 19th century

- Shown in Fife Kellie Lodge (Scotland)
- 56.21342°N 2.7298°W
- Location: 23 High Street, Pittenweem, Fife

History
- Built: c. 1590 (436 years ago)

Listed Building – Category A
- Official name: Kelly Lodge, 23 High Street
- Designated: 18 August 1972
- Reference no.: LB39905

Kellie Lodge is a building in Pittenweem, Fife, Scotland. Located at 23 High Street, it is Category A listed.

Some of the three-storey building dates to 1590, but it was largely rebuilt and restored between 1969 and 1971.

An L-plan town house, it is harled with its margins pantiled. It has swept dormer heads and crowsteps, a front ashlar stair Anstruther tower (older than the lodge to which it is attached) and a turret stair. The rest of the frontage is in a small forecourt.

The lodge was formerly the residence of the Earls of Kellie.

== Gallery ==
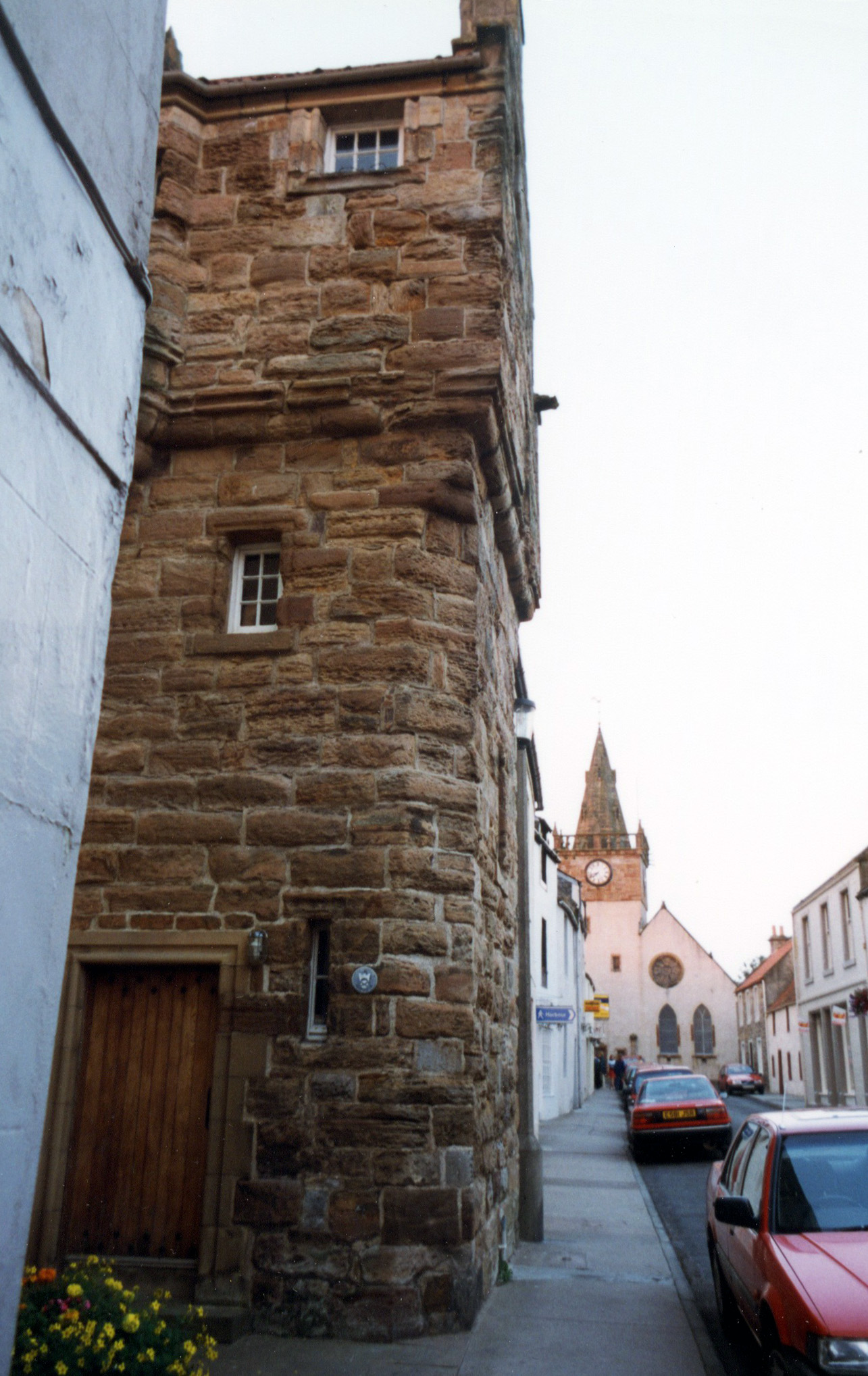
The building in 1998, looking north along High Street. The northern side of the tower has been built out, to almost being flush with the tower's façade

== See also ==
- List of listed buildings in Pittenweem, Fife
- List of Category A listed buildings in Fife
