= Kilmany Parish Church =

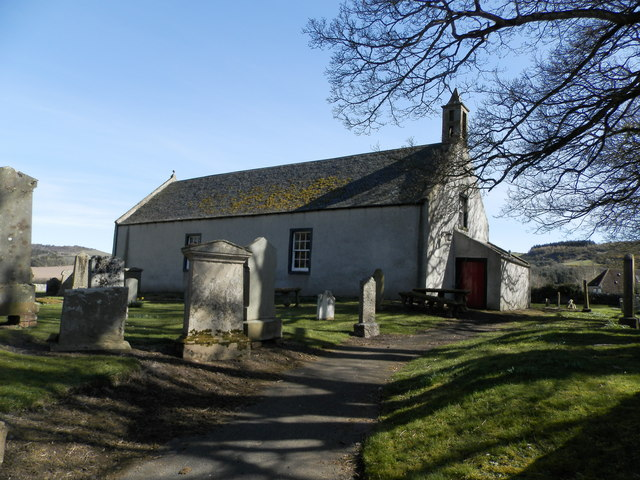
- The church in 2015
- Kilmany Parish Church
- 56°23′03″N 2°59′32″W
- Location: Kilmany, Fife
- Country: Scotland
- Denomination: Church of Scotland

Architecture
- Completed: 1768 (258 years ago)

Kilmany Parish Church is an ancient church building in Kilmany, Fife, Scotland. Dating to 1768, it is Category A listed.

The church's pulpit was re-seated in 1859 by Jack of Rathillet and repaired with advice from David Rhind over the next two years.

== See also ==
- List of listed buildings in Kilmany, Fife
- List of Category A listed buildings in Fife
