= List of listed buildings in Crail, Fife =

This is a list of listed buildings in the parish of Crail in Fife, Scotland.

== List ==
Name	Location	Date listed	Grid ref. (Note: Sometimes known as OSGB36, the grid reference (where provided) is based on the British national grid reference system used by the Ordnance Survey. • "Guide to National Grid". Ordnance Survey. • "Get-a-map". Ordnance Survey.)	Geo-coordinates	Notes	LB number (Note: Historic Environment Scotland assign a unique alphanumeric identifier to each designated site in Scotland, for listed buildings this always begins with "LB", for example "LB12345".)	Image
8 And 9 Rumford				56°15′33″N 2°37′34″W	Category B	23424	Upload Photo
21 Nethergate				56°15′40″N 2°37′25″W	Category C(S)	23430	Upload Photo
53 And 55 Nethergate				56°15′35″N 2°37′30″W	Category C(S)	23437	Upload Photo
71 Nethergate				56°15′34″N 2°37′34″W	Category C(S)	23443	Upload Photo
75 Nethergate				56°15′33″N 2°37′36″W	Category B	23444	Upload another image
Nunnery Walls, Nethergate				56°15′41″N 2°37′21″W	Category B	23447	Upload Photo
The Priory, Nethergate				56°15′39″N 2°37′22″W	Category B	23448	Upload Photo
18-28 Nethergate, Downie's Terrace				56°15′38″N 2°37′23″W	Category B	23451	Upload Photo
44 Nethergate				56°15′36″N 2°37′27″W	Category B	23457	Upload Photo
74 Nethergate				56°15′34″N 2°37′32″W	Category C(S)	23468	Upload Photo
The Watchhouse, Kings Mills				56°15′31″N 2°37′32″W	Category C(S)	23471	Upload Photo
The Market Cross Marketgate				56°15′41″N 2°37′31″W	Category B	23288	Upload Photo
The Golf Hotel 4 High Street				56°15′38″N 2°37′36″W	Category A	23290	Upload another image See more images
Moray House 10 High Street				56°15′37″N 2°37′36″W	Category C(S)	23292	Upload Photo
48 And 52 High Street				56°15′34″N 2°37′39″W	Category B	23301	Upload Photo
56 And 58 High Street				56°15′33″N 2°37′40″W	Category B	23303	Upload Photo
17 And 19 High Street				56°15′37″N 2°37′39″W	Category B	23310	Upload Photo
43 & 45 High Street				56°15′34″N 2°37′42″W	Category C(S)	23316	Upload Photo
51 & 53 High Street				56°15′34″N 2°37′42″W	Category C(S)	23318	Upload Photo
63 High Street				56°15′33″N 2°37′43″W	Category C(S)	23322	Upload Photo
5 West Green				56°15′35″N 2°37′43″W	Category C(S)	23329	Upload Photo
20 West Green Including Outbuilding				56°15′32″N 2°37′45″W	Category B	23340	Upload Photo
22 West Green				56°15′31″N 2°37′45″W	Category C(S)	23342	Upload Photo
1 Westgate				56°15′32″N 2°37′43″W	Category C(S)	23346	Upload Photo
9 Westgate				56°15′30″N 2°37′45″W	Category B	23349	Upload Photo
5 Shoregate				56°15′31″N 2°37′41″W	Category B	23363	Upload Photo
7, 7A And 7B Shoregate				56°15′31″N 2°37′41″W	Category C(S)	23364	Upload Photo
19 Shoregate				56°15′29″N 2°37′39″W	Category B	23369	Upload Photo
33 Shoregate				56°15′28″N 2°37′41″W	Category C(S)	23377	Upload Photo
39 Shoregate				56°15′28″N 2°37′42″W	Category B	23380	Upload Photo
22 Shoregate				56°15′29″N 2°37′37″W	Category B	23389	Upload Photo
30 And 32 Shoregate				56°15′28″N 2°37′38″W	Category C(S)	23393	Upload Photo
1, 2, 3 And 4 Castle Terrace Including Retaining Wall				56°15′30″N 2°37′38″W	Category B	23399	Upload Photo
25 Castle Street And 12 Shoregate				56°15′31″N 2°37′39″W	Category B	23406	Upload another image
10 Castle Street				56°15′35″N 2°37′36″W	Category B	23409	Upload Photo
26 Castle Street				56°15′33″N 2°37′36″W	Category C(S)	23415	Upload Photo
28 Castle Street				56°15′33″N 2°37′36″W	Category B	23416	Upload Photo
Rumford, Garden Walls And Garage				56°15′33″N 2°37′32″W	Category C(S)	23421	Upload Photo
5 And 6 Rumford				56°15′34″N 2°37′33″W	Category B	23422	Upload Photo
Parish Churchyard Walls And Gravestones				56°15′46″N 2°37′31″W	Category A	23245	Upload another image
Bluestane House 5 Marketgate Including Garden Wall S Outbuildings And 'Blue Stane'				56°15′44″N 2°37′30″W	Category B	23249	Upload Photo
Sundial Within Garden Of 5 Marketgate				56°15′44″N 2°37′36″W	Category B	23250	Upload Photo
Friar's Court 9 Marketgate (Including Garden Wall S)				56°15′42″N 2°37′32″W	Category A	23253	Upload another image
11 Marketgate				56°15′42″N 2°37′33″W	Category B	23254	Upload Photo
21 Marketgate				56°15′40″N 2°37′35″W	Category B	23258	Upload Photo
12 Marketgate				56°15′43″N 2°37′28″W	Category C(S)	23266	Upload Photo
16 And 18 Marketgate				56°15′42″N 2°37′29″W	Category C(S)	23268	Upload Photo
22 Marketgate				56°15′41″N 2°37′29″W	Category B	23270	Upload Photo
34 Marketgate				56°15′41″N 2°37′30″W	Category C(S)	23274	Upload Photo
Crail Airfield, Technical Area, Fire Station, No 62298 09198				56°16′26″N 2°36′37″W	Category C(S)	50558	Upload Photo
Crail Airfield, Technical Area, Main Office, No 62371 09170				56°16′25″N 2°36′33″W	Category B	50564	Upload Photo
9 Nethergate				56°15′41″N 2°37′23″W	Category C(S)	23426	Upload Photo
64 Nethergate				56°15′33″N 2°37′30″W	Category C(S)	23464	Upload Photo
70 And 72 Nethergate				56°15′34″N 2°37′32″W	Category C(S)	23467	Upload Photo
Library (Former Burgh School) Nethergate				56°15′35″N 2°37′30″W	Category B	23470	Upload Photo
8 And 10 Tolbooth Wynd Including Garden Wall To Tolbooth Wynd				56°15′37″N 2°37′28″W	Category B	23475	Upload Photo
11 St Andrew's Road				56°15′40″N 2°37′38″W	Category C(S)	23477	Upload Photo
The Tolbooth And Town Hall, Marketgate				56°15′39″N 2°37′34″W	Category A	23287	Upload another image See more images
2 High Street And Corner Of Tolbooth Wynd				56°15′38″N 2°37′35″W	Category C(S)	23289	Upload Photo
16 High Street And 2 Castle Street				56°15′37″N 2°37′36″W	Category B	23293	Upload Photo
42 And 44 High Street				56°15′34″N 2°37′39″W	Category C(S)	23299	Upload Photo
5 And 7 High Street				56°15′38″N 2°37′38″W	Category C(S)	23308	Upload Photo
16 West Green				56°15′33″N 2°37′45″W	Category C(S)	23336	Upload Photo
19 West Green				56°15′32″N 2°37′45″W	Category C(S)	23339	Upload Photo
16 And 18 Westgate				56°15′29″N 2°37′45″W	Category B	23353	Upload Photo
1 West Lane And 1 Shoregate				56°15′31″N 2°37′42″W	Category B	23358	Upload Photo
9 And 11 Shoregate				56°15′30″N 2°37′40″W	Category B	23365	Upload Photo
13 Shoregate				56°15′30″N 2°37′40″W	Category B	23366	Upload Photo
21 Shoregate				56°15′29″N 2°37′38″W	Category B	23370	Upload Photo
25 Shoregate				56°15′29″N 2°37′39″W	Category C(S)	23373	Upload Photo
34-45 Shoregate, Retaining Walls				56°15′28″N 2°37′44″W	Category B	23384	Upload Photo
10 Shoregate				56°15′31″N 2°37′40″W	Category B	23387	Upload Photo
38 Shoregate Harbour Office				56°15′28″N 2°37′39″W	Category B	23397	Upload Photo
17 Castle Street				56°15′32″N 2°37′37″W	Category C(S)	23404	Upload Photo
2 Rose Wynd Bruce Cottage				56°15′35″N 2°37′36″W	Category C(S)	23419	Upload Photo
Kirkmay House Hotel 7 Marketgate				56°15′43″N 2°37′33″W	Category A	23251	Upload another image
17 Marketgate				56°15′41″N 2°37′34″W	Category C(S)	23256	Upload Photo
25 27, 29 Marketgate				56°15′40″N 2°37′35″W	Category C(S)	23260	Upload Photo
30 And 32 Marketgate				56°15′41″N 2°37′30″W	Category B	23273	Upload Photo
36 Marketgate				56°15′41″N 2°37′30″W	Category B	23275	Upload Photo
Kingsmuir Farm, House				56°15′58″N 2°45′02″W	Category B	4334	Upload Photo
Cambo, Gamekeepers Lodge				56°17′08″N 2°38′58″W	Category B	51	Upload Photo
Crail Airfield, Technical Area, Aircraft Painting Hangar, No 62422 09300				56°16′29″N 2°36′30″W	Category B	50548	Upload Photo
Crail Airfield, Technical Area, Electrical Substation A, No 62300 09176				56°16′25″N 2°36′37″W	Category C(S)	50556	Upload Photo
Crail Airfield, Technical Area, Pump Houses, No 62258 09147 And No62270 09142				56°16′24″N 2°36′40″W	Category C(S)	50569	Upload Photo
Crail Airfield, Technical Area, Torpedo Workshop, No 62435 09259				56°16′28″N 2°36′30″W	Category B	50574	Upload Photo
Crail Airfield, West Camp, Church, No 62140 09275				56°16′28″N 2°36′47″W	Category C(S)	50575	Upload Photo
Crail Airfield, West Camp, Junior Officers Quarters, No 61933 09234				56°16′27″N 2°36′59″W	Category C(S)	50577	Upload Photo
10 Rumford				56°15′33″N 2°37′35″W	Category B	23425	Upload Photo
23 Nethergate				56°15′39″N 2°37′24″W	Category C(S)	23431	Upload Photo
67 Nethergate				56°15′34″N 2°37′33″W	Category C(S)	23441	Upload Photo
30 Nethergate				56°15′37″N 2°37′25″W	Category C(S)	23452	Upload Photo
Crail Church Hall, St Andrew's Road Including Front Wall, Railings And Wrought-Iron Lampholders				56°15′43″N 2°37′46″W	Category B	23478	Upload Photo
56 Marketgate				56°15′39″N 2°37′33″W	Category C(S)	23282	Upload Photo
26 High Street				56°15′36″N 2°37′38″W	Category C(S)	23294	Upload Photo
Former Maltings Building At Rear Of 56-60 High St Reet				56°15′32″N 2°37′41″W	Category C(S)	23305	Upload Photo
27 & 29 High Street				56°15′36″N 2°37′40″W	Category C(S)	23314	Upload Photo
47 & 49 High Street				56°15′34″N 2°37′41″W	Category C(S)	23317	Upload Photo
21 West Green Including Front Area Wall And Outbuilding				56°15′31″N 2°37′46″W	Category C(S)	23341	Upload Photo
6 Westgate				56°15′30″N 2°37′43″W	Category B	23351	Upload Photo
Longskerrys, West Braes				56°15′24″N 2°37′50″W	Category B	23357	Upload Photo
2 Shoregate, Burgess House Including Garden Wall To Shoregate And St Clair's Wynd				56°15′32″N 2°37′41″W	Category C(S)	23385	Upload Photo
20 Shoregate				56°15′30″N 2°37′36″W	Category B	23388	Upload Photo
Crail Castle Wall With Stabling And Coachhouses				56°15′31″N 2°37′38″W	Category B	23400	Upload Photo
8 Castle Street				56°15′36″N 2°37′36″W	Category B	23408	Upload Photo
12 Castle Street				56°15′35″N 2°37′37″W	Category B	23410	Upload Photo
20 And 22 Castle Street				56°15′34″N 2°37′36″W	Category C(S)	23413	Upload Photo
1 And 2 Rumford Including Garden Walls And Outbuildings				56°15′32″N 2°37′33″W	Category B	23420	Upload Photo
Crail Parish Church				56°15′46″N 2°37′33″W	Category A	23244	Upload another image See more images
Denburn House 1 Marketgate Including Outbuildings And Garden Walls				56°15′45″N 2°37′28″W	Category B	23247	Upload Photo
13-15 Marketgate				56°15′41″N 2°37′33″W	Category C(S)	23255	Upload Photo
23 Marketgate				56°15′40″N 2°37′35″W	Category C(S)	23259	Upload Photo
24 Marketgate				56°15′41″N 2°37′29″W	Category B	23271	Upload Photo
Balcomie Castle, Walled Garden				56°16′46″N 2°36′21″W	Category B	4328	Upload Photo
Crail Airfield, Technical Area, Air Ministry Laboratory Trainer Building, No 62357 09269				56°16′28″N 2°36′34″W	Category A	50549	Upload Photo
Crail Airfield, Technical Area, Decontamination Station, No 62354 09138				56°16′24″N 2°36′34″W	Category C(S)	50553	Upload Photo
Crail Airfield, Technical Area, Photographic Building, No 62531 09021				56°16′20″N 2°36′24″W	Category B	50568	Upload Photo
57 And 59 Nethergate				56°15′35″N 2°37′31″W	Category C(S)	23438	Upload Photo
32 Nethergate				56°15′37″N 2°37′25″W	Category C(S)	23453	Upload Photo
40 And 42 Nethergate				56°15′36″N 2°37′27″W	Category C(S)	23456	Upload Photo
60 Nethergate				56°15′33″N 2°37′29″W	Category C(S)	23462	Upload Photo
68 Nethergate Including Garden Walls And Outbuildings				56°15′33″N 2°37′31″W	Category B	23466	Upload Photo
46 High Street				56°15′34″N 2°37′39″W	Category B	23300	Upload Photo
55 & 57 High Street				56°15′33″N 2°37′42″W	Category B	23319	Upload Photo
13 West Green, Town Council Store And Garage				56°15′34″N 2°37′44″W	Category C(S)	23334	Upload Photo
14 & 15 West Green				56°15′33″N 2°37′44″W	Category C(S)	23335	Upload Photo
23 West Green				56°15′31″N 2°37′45″W	Category C(S)	23343	Upload Photo
7 Westgate				56°15′31″N 2°37′44″W	Category B	23348	Upload Photo
3 Shoregate				56°15′31″N 2°37′42″W	Category B	23362	Upload Photo
37 Shoregate Including Area Walls				56°15′28″N 2°37′41″W	Category B	23379	Upload Photo
24 Shoregate				56°15′29″N 2°37′37″W	Category B	23390	Upload Photo
34 Shoregate				56°15′28″N 2°37′39″W	Category B	23395	Upload Photo
Crail Castle				56°15′30″N 2°37′33″W	Category B	23401	Upload Photo
1 Rose Wynd				56°15′35″N 2°37′36″W	Category B	23418	Upload Photo
7 Rumford				56°15′33″N 2°37′34″W	Category B	23423	Upload Photo
Kirkmay House Hotel Entrance Gates And Garden Wall S Marketgate				56°15′43″N 2°37′31″W	Category B	23252	Upload Photo
2 Marketgate				56°15′44″N 2°37′27″W	Category B	23262	Upload Photo
4 Marketgate				56°15′44″N 2°37′27″W	Category B	23263	Upload Photo
26 And 28 Marketgate				56°15′41″N 2°37′30″W	Category B	23272	Upload Photo
46 Marketgate				56°15′40″N 2°37′31″W	Category C(S)	23278	Upload Photo
Airdrie Lodge, Gatepiers				56°15′19″N 2°42′03″W	Category B	4333	Upload Photo
Crail Airfield, Technical Area, Armoury, No 62535 09242				56°16′27″N 2°36′24″W	Category B	50550	Upload Photo
Crail Airfield, Technical Area, Generating Station, No 62402 09329				56°16′30″N 2°36′31″W	Category C(S)	50560	Upload Photo
Crail Airfield, West Camp, Gymnasium And Cinema, No 62168 09290				56°16′28″N 2°36′45″W	Category B	50576	Upload Photo
25 And 27 Nethergate				56°15′39″N 2°37′25″W	Category C(S)	23432	Upload Photo
63 Nethergate				56°15′35″N 2°37′32″W	Category C(S)	23440	Upload Photo
14 Nethergate				56°15′39″N 2°37′22″W	Category C(S)	23449	Upload Photo
2 Kirk Wynd				56°15′45″N 2°37′26″W	Category C(S)	23473	Upload Photo
5, 7, 8 And 9 St Andrew's Road				56°15′40″N 2°37′37″W	Category C(S)	23476	Upload Photo
52, 54 Marketgate				56°15′39″N 2°37′32″W	Category C(S)	23281	Upload Photo
3 High Street				56°15′38″N 2°37′37″W	Category B	23307	Upload Photo
East Neuk Hotel, High Street				56°15′32″N 2°37′44″W	Category C(S)	23324	Upload Photo
3 West Green				56°15′35″N 2°37′41″W	Category C(S)	23327	Upload Photo
18 West Green				56°15′32″N 2°37′45″W	Category C(S)	23338	Upload Photo
25 And 26 West Green				56°15′30″N 2°37′45″W	Category C(S)	23345	Upload Photo
David Mayes' Garages 11 Westgate				56°15′30″N 2°37′45″W	Category C(S)	23350	Upload Photo
14 Westgate				56°15′29″N 2°37′45″W	Category B	23352	Upload Photo
23 Shoregate				56°15′29″N 2°37′38″W	Category C(S)	23371	Upload Photo
Retaining Walls Fronting 15 To 23 Shoregate				56°15′29″N 2°37′38″W	Category B	23372	Upload Photo
27 Shoregate				56°15′28″N 2°37′39″W	Category C(S)	23374	Upload Photo
45 Shoregate				56°15′28″N 2°37′43″W	Category B	23383	Upload Photo
26 Shoregate				56°15′29″N 2°37′38″W	Category B	23391	Upload Photo
Sundial, Castle Promenade				56°15′29″N 2°37′34″W	Category B	23402	Upload another image See more images
1 Castle Street (And 22 High Street Including Wall To Castle Street)				56°15′36″N 2°37′37″W	Category B	23403	Upload Photo
17-25 Castle Street And 12 Shoregate, Retaining Walls				56°15′30″N 2°37′39″W	Category C(S)	23407	Upload Photo
16 And 18 Castle Street				56°15′34″N 2°37′36″W	Category C(S)	23412	Upload Photo
19 Marketgate Archway To The Close				56°15′41″N 2°37′34″W	Category C(S)	23257	Upload Photo
6 And 8 Marketgate				56°15′43″N 2°37′28″W	Category B	23264	Upload Photo
10 Marketgate				56°15′43″N 2°37′28″W	Category C(S)	23265	Upload Photo
Balcomie Castle, Including Farmhouse And Steading				56°16′47″N 2°36′27″W	Category B	4327	Upload Photo
West Newhall Farmhouse				56°16′52″N 2°39′02″W	Category B	4331	Upload Photo
Crail Airfield, Technical Area, Control Tower, No 62565 09048				56°16′21″N 2°36′22″W	Category A	50552	Upload Photo
Crail Airfield, Technical Area, Latrine Block, No 62553 09398				56°16′32″N 2°36′23″W	Category C(S)	50563	Upload Photo
Crail Airfield, Technical Area, Sick Bay, No 62314 09121				56°16′23″N 2°36′36″W	Category B	50571	Upload Photo
Crail Airfield, Technical Area, Squadron Office, No 62383 09131				56°16′23″N 2°36′32″W	Category B	50572	Upload Photo
Crail Airfield, Technical Area, Torpedo Attack Training Building, No 62451 09377				56°16′31″N 2°36′29″W	Category A	50573	Upload Photo
13 Nethergate				56°15′41″N 2°37′23″W	Category C(S)	23428	Upload Photo
19 Nethergate				56°15′40″N 2°37′24″W	Category C(S)	23429	Upload Photo
29 Nethergate				56°15′39″N 2°37′25″W	Category C(S)	23433	Upload Photo
61 Nethergate				56°15′35″N 2°37′32″W	Category C(S)	23439	Upload Photo
38 Nethergate				56°15′36″N 2°37′26″W	Category B	23455	Upload Photo
54 Nethergate, Marine Hotel				56°15′34″N 2°37′28″W	Category C(S)	23460	Upload Photo
76 Nethergate				56°15′34″N 2°37′31″W	Category C(S)	23469	Upload Photo
St Christopher's Kirk Wynd				56°15′44″N 2°37′27″W	Category C(S)	23472	Upload Photo
60 Marketgate, Balfour House Including Garden Wall To Tolbooth Wynd				56°15′38″N 2°37′34″W	Category B	23284	Upload Photo
Cowan House 8 High Street				56°15′37″N 2°37′36″W	Category C(S)	23291	Upload Photo
34 And 36 High Street				56°15′35″N 2°37′38″W	Category C(S)	23297	Upload Photo
38 And 40 High Street				56°15′34″N 2°37′38″W	Category C(S)	23298	Upload Photo
59 High Street				56°15′33″N 2°37′42″W	Category C(S)	23320	Upload Photo
1 West Green Including Front Area Wall				56°15′35″N 2°37′41″W	Category C(S)	23325	Upload Photo
Bakery And Store (R Fisher) West Green				56°15′34″N 2°37′42″W	Category C(S)	23333	Upload Photo
3, 5 Westgate, Airds Court Including Courtyard Wall And Gatepiers				56°15′31″N 2°37′44″W	Category C(S)	23347	Upload Photo
20 Westgate				56°15′29″N 2°37′46″W	Category C(S)	23354	Upload Photo
22 And 24 Westgate				56°15′29″N 2°37′44″W	Category B	23355	Upload Photo
4, 5 West Lane				56°15′31″N 2°37′42″W	Category C(S)	23360	Upload Photo
41 Shoregate				56°15′28″N 2°37′42″W	Category C(S)	23381	Upload Photo
43 Shoregate				56°15′28″N 2°37′43″W	Category C(S)	23382	Upload Photo
Public Convenience, Shoregate				56°15′28″N 2°37′38″W	Category C(S)	23394	Upload Photo
23 Castle Street				56°15′32″N 2°37′39″W	Category C(S)	23405	Upload Photo
14 Castle Street Including Back Building Used By Occupants Of No 12				56°15′35″N 2°37′36″W	Category C(S)	23411	Upload Photo
14 Marketgate				56°15′42″N 2°37′28″W	Category C(S)	23267	Upload Photo
48 Marketgate				56°15′40″N 2°37′32″W	Category C(S)	23279	Upload Photo
Wormiston, Doocot				56°16′38″N 2°37′53″W	Category A	4329	Upload another image
Crail Airfield, Technical Area, Army Personnel Building, No 62499 09391				56°16′32″N 2°36′26″W	Category C(S)	50551	Upload Photo
Crail Airfield, Technical Area, Engine And Aircraft Repair Shop, No 62507 09328				56°16′30″N 2°36′25″W	Category A	50557	Upload Photo
Crail Airfield, Technical Area, Flame Store, No 62357 09112				56°16′23″N 2°36′34″W	Category C(S)	50559	Upload Photo
Crail Airfield, Technical Area, Guard House, No 62323 09233				56°16′27″N 2°36′36″W	Category B	50561	Upload Photo
Crail Airfield, Technical Area, Passive Defence Shelters, No 62350 09284 And No 62366 09311				56°16′28″N 2°36′34″W	Category C(S)	50567	Upload Photo
Crail Airfield, Technical Area, Sea Markers Store, No 62286 09165				56°16′24″N 2°36′38″W	Category C(S)	50570	Upload Photo
Crail Airfield, West Camp, Junior Rates Block No 61747 09190				56°16′25″N 2°37′09″W	Category C(S)	50578	Upload Photo
31 Nethergate				56°15′38″N 2°37′26″W	Category C(S)	23434	Upload Photo
47 Nethergate				56°15′36″N 2°37′29″W	Category C(S)	23436	Upload Photo
69 Nethergate, Maldon				56°15′34″N 2°37′33″W	Category C(S)	23442	Upload Photo
16 Nethergate				56°15′39″N 2°37′23″W	Category B	23450	Upload Photo
48 Nethergate				56°15′35″N 2°37′28″W	Category C(S)	23458	Upload Photo
50 And 52 Nethergate				56°15′35″N 2°37′28″W	Category B	23459	Upload Photo
56 And 58 Nethergate				56°15′34″N 2°37′29″W	Category C(S)	23461	Upload Photo
62 Nethergate				56°15′33″N 2°37′30″W	Category C(S)	23463	Upload Photo
7 Tolbooth Street, Selcraig, Including Boundary Walls				56°15′37″N 2°37′31″W	Category C(S)	23474	Upload Photo
50 Marketgate				56°15′40″N 2°37′32″W	Category C(S)	23280	Upload Photo
64 Marketgate				56°15′39″N 2°37′34″W	Category B	23286	Upload Photo
30 And 32 High Street				56°15′35″N 2°37′38″W	Category C(S)	23296	Upload Photo
62 High Street				56°15′32″N 2°37′41″W	Category C(S)	23306	Upload Photo
15 High Street				56°15′37″N 2°37′38″W	Category C(S)	23309	Upload Photo
31 & 33 High Street				56°15′36″N 2°37′40″W	Category C(S)	23315	Upload Photo
61 High Street				56°15′33″N 2°37′43″W	Category C(S)	23321	Upload Photo
26 Westgate, The Haven				56°15′28″N 2°37′47″W	Category B	23356	Upload Photo
6 West Lane				56°15′30″N 2°37′41″W	Category B	23361	Upload Photo
17 Shoregate				56°15′30″N 2°37′39″W	Category B	23368	Upload Photo
29 Shoregate				56°15′28″N 2°37′40″W	Category C(S)	23375	Upload Photo
35 Shoregate (The Custom House)				56°15′28″N 2°37′41″W	Category A	23378	Upload another image See more images
8 Shoregate				56°15′31″N 2°37′40″W	Category B	23386	Upload Photo
Crail Harbour				56°15′27″N 2°37′43″W	Category A	23398	Upload another image See more images
24 Castle Street				56°15′33″N 2°37′36″W	Category C(S)	23414	Upload Photo
Parish Churchyard Deadhouse				56°15′46″N 2°37′34″W	Category B	23246	Upload Photo
Wormiston, Stables				56°16′37″N 2°37′46″W	Category B	4330	Upload another image
Crail Airfield, Technical Area, Latrine Block, No 62404 09143				56°16′24″N 2°36′31″W	Category C(S)	50562	Upload Photo
Crail Airfield, Technical Area, Main Store Sheds, No 62587 09376				56°16′31″N 2°36′21″W	Category B	50565	Upload Photo
11 Nethergate				56°15′41″N 2°37′23″W	Category C(S)	23427	Upload Photo
43 Nethergate				56°15′37″N 2°37′27″W	Category B	23435	Upload Photo
Priory Doocot, Off Nethergate				56°15′41″N 2°37′18″W	Category A	23445	Upload another image See more images
Garage And Garden Wall To Doocot Park, Nethergate				56°15′41″N 2°37′21″W	Category B	23446	Upload Photo
36 Nethergate				56°15′36″N 2°37′26″W	Category B	23454	Upload Photo
66 Nethergate				56°15′33″N 2°37′31″W	Category B	23465	Upload Photo
58 Marketgate				56°15′39″N 2°37′33″W	Category C(S)	23283	Upload Photo
62 Marketgate				56°15′39″N 2°37′34″W	Category C(S)	23285	Upload Photo
The Beehive 28 High Street				56°15′35″N 2°37′38″W	Category C(S)	23295	Upload Photo
54 High Street				56°15′33″N 2°37′40″W	Category B	23302	Upload Photo
60 High Street				56°15′32″N 2°37′41″W	Category B	23304	Upload Photo
21 High Street				56°15′36″N 2°37′39″W	Category C(S)	23311	Upload Photo
23 High Street				56°15′36″N 2°37′39″W	Category C(S)	23312	Upload Photo
25 High Street				56°15′36″N 2°37′39″W	Category C(S)	23313	Upload Photo
65 High Street				56°15′33″N 2°37′43″W	Category C(S)	23323	Upload Photo
2 West Green Including Front Area Wall				56°15′35″N 2°37′41″W	Category C(S)	23326	Upload Photo
4 West Green				56°15′35″N 2°37′42″W	Category C(S)	23328	Upload Photo
9-10 West Green				56°15′34″N 2°37′43″W	Category C(S)	23330	Upload Photo
11 West Green				56°15′33″N 2°37′43″W	Category C(S)	23331	Upload Photo
Garage (R Anderson) West Green				56°15′34″N 2°37′42″W	Category C(S)	23332	Upload Photo
17 West Green				56°15′33″N 2°37′45″W	Category C(S)	23337	Upload Photo
24 West Green				56°15′31″N 2°37′46″W	Category C(S)	23344	Upload Photo
3 West Lane				56°15′31″N 2°37′42″W	Category C(S)	23359	Upload Photo
15 Shoregate				56°15′30″N 2°37′39″W	Category B	23367	Upload Photo
31 Shoregate				56°15′28″N 2°37′40″W	Category C(S)	23376	Upload Photo
28 Shoregate				56°15′28″N 2°37′38″W	Category B	23392	Upload Photo
36 Shoregate				56°15′28″N 2°37′39″W	Category B	23396	Upload Photo
31 Castle Street				56°15′32″N 2°37′35″W	Category B	23417	Upload another image
The Old Manse 3 Marketgate Including Garden Walls And Outbuildings				56°15′45″N 2°37′28″W	Category B	23248	Upload Photo
Royal Bank Of Scotland Marketgate And St Andrew's Road				56°15′39″N 2°37′36″W	Category C(S)	23261	Upload Photo
20 Marketgate, Garwyn				56°15′42″N 2°37′29″W	Category C(S)	23269	Upload Photo
38 And 40 Marketgate				56°15′40″N 2°37′31″W	Category B	23276	Upload Photo
42 And 44 Marketgate				56°15′40″N 2°37′31″W	Category B	23277	Upload Photo
Airdrie House				56°16′00″N 2°42′05″W	Category B	4332	Upload Photo
Wormiston House				56°16′38″N 2°37′49″W	Category B	50	Upload another image
Crail Airfield, Technical Area, Disinfector House, No 62310 09088				56°16′22″N 2°36′37″W	Category C(S)	50554	Upload Photo
Crail Airfield, Technical Area, Dispersal Area Office, No 62343 09101				56°16′22″N 2°36′35″W	Category C(S)	50555	Upload Photo
Crail Airfield, Technical Area, Mortuary, No 62286 09091				56°16′22″N 2°36′38″W	Category C(S)	50566	Upload Photo
North Carr Beacon, Carr Brigs, Fife Ness				56°17′42″N 2°34′18″W	Category B	52556	Upload another image
Fife Ness Lighthouse				56°16′44″N 2°35′10″W	Category B	52557	Upload another image

== Key ==
The scheme for classifying buildings in Scotland is:

- Category A: "buildings of national or international importance, either architectural or historic; or fine, little-altered examples of some particular period, style or building type."
- Category B: "buildings of regional or more than local importance; or major examples of some particular period, style or building type, which may have been altered."
- Category C: "buildings of local importance; lesser examples of any period, style, or building type, as originally constructed or moderately altered; and simple traditional buildings which group well with other listed buildings."

In March 2016 there were 47,288 listed buildings in Scotland. Of these, 8% were Category A, and 50% were Category B, with the remaining 42% being Category C.

== See also ==
- List of listed buildings in Fife
