= Golf Hotel =

Building in Crail, Scotland

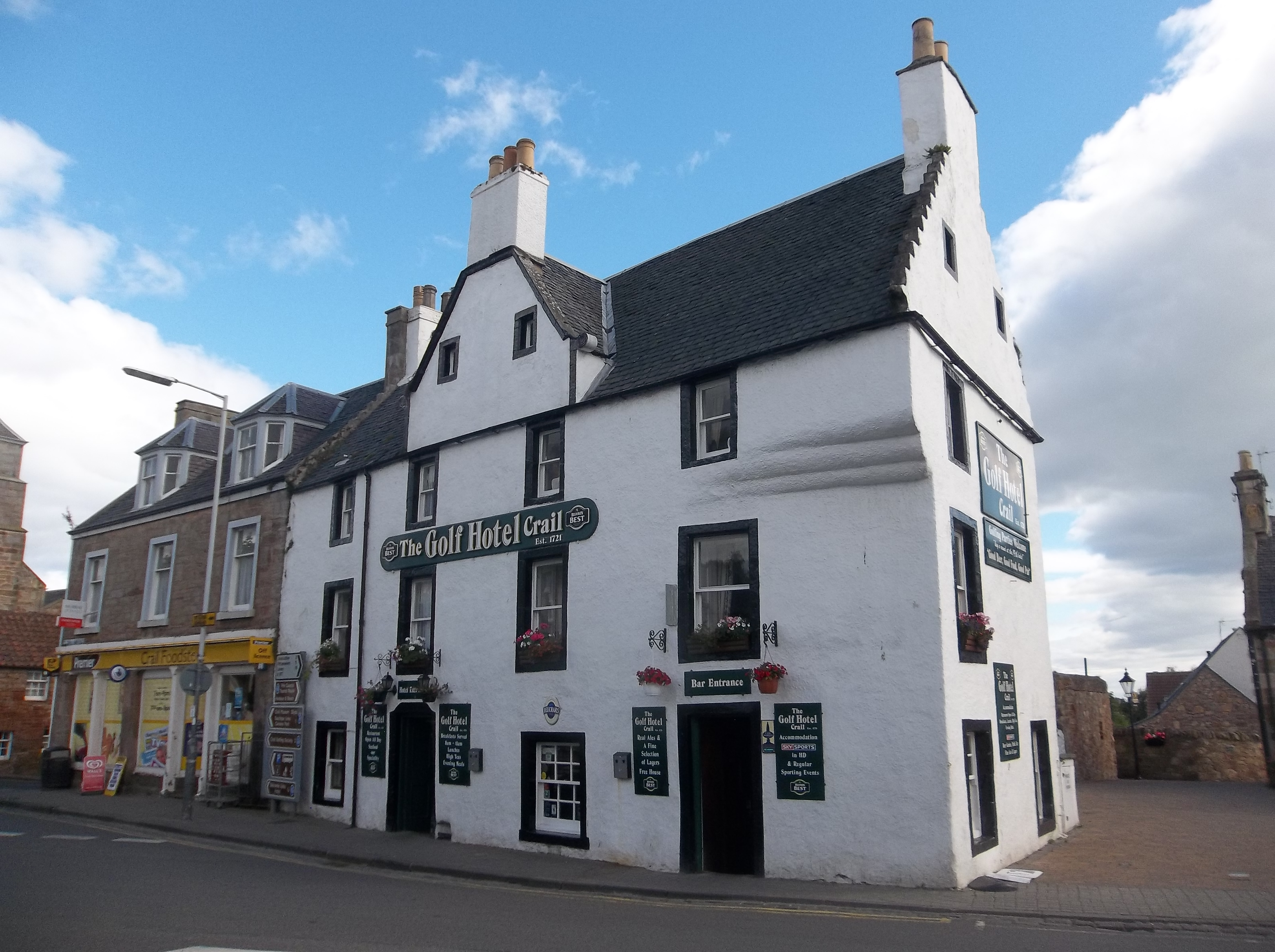
- The building in 2013
- Interactive map of the Golf Hotel area
- Former names: Golf Inn

General information
- Type: Hotel and restaurant
- Location: Crail, Fife, 4 High Street, Scotland
- Coordinates: 56°15′38″N 2°37′36″W
- Completed: early 18th century
- Owner: Graham Guthrie

Technical details
- Floor count: 4

Website
- www.thegolfhotelcrail.com

Listed Building – Category A
- Official name: The Golf Hotel 4 High Street
- Designated: 9 May 1972
- Reference no.: LB23290

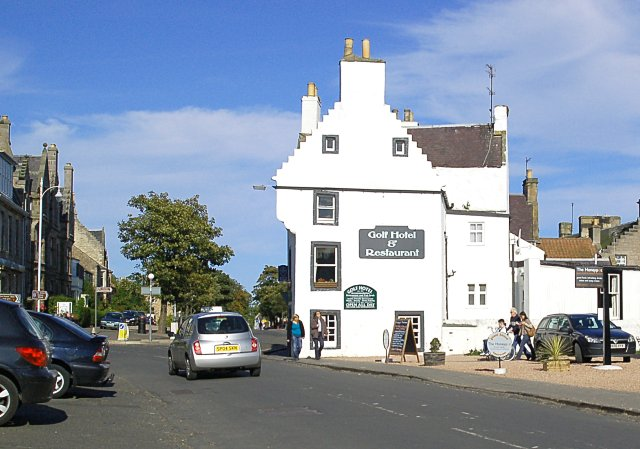
The building's southern elevation

The Golf Hotel is a hotel and restaurant in Crail, Fife, Scotland. It is a Category A listed building dating to the early 18th century, although one source claims it is 16th century.

John Dickson, a sergeant major in the Royal Scots Greys who fought in the 1815 Battle of Waterloo, became a landlord at the establishment when it was known as the Golf Inn. He was the last known Scot involved in the battle when he died, aged 97.

== See also ==
- List of listed buildings in Crail, Fife
- List of Category A listed buildings in Fife
