= List of listed buildings in Kilmany, Fife =

This is a list of listed buildings in the parish of Kilmany in Fife, Scotland.

== List ==
| Name | Location | Date listed | Grid ref. (Note: Sometimes known as OSGB36, the grid reference (where provided) is based on the British national grid reference system used by the Ordnance Survey. • "Guide to National Grid". Ordnance Survey. • "Get-a-map". Ordnance Survey.) | Geo-coordinates | Notes | LB number (Note: Historic Environment Scotland assign a unique alphanumeric identifier to each designated site in Scotland, for listed buildings this always begins with "LB", for example "LB12345".) | Image |
|---|---|---|---|---|---|---|---|
| Mountquhanie House Sundial | | | | 56°22′40″N 3°03′28″W | Category C(S) | 13697 | Upload Photo |
| Drumnod Farmhouse | | | | 56°22′42″N 3°04′12″W | Category B | 13698 | Upload Photo |
| Cottage, Now Stable (Lord Kilmany) Kilmany | | | | 56°23′04″N 2°59′34″W | Category C(S) | 8783 | Upload Photo |
| Smithy And Two Cottages Adjoining, Both Lord Kilmany's | | | | 56°23′03″N 2°59′36″W | Category B | 8784 | Upload Photo |
| Kilmany Manse | | | | 56°22′55″N 2°59′43″W | Category C(S) | 13696 | Upload Photo |
| Kilmany Parish Kirk | | | | 56°23′03″N 2°59′32″W | Category A | 8826 | Upload another image |
| Stirton Mill | | | | 56°23′05″N 3°02′13″W | Category B | 8876 | Upload Photo |
| Easter Kilmany Farmhouse | | | | 56°23′05″N 2°59′33″W | Category B | 8788 | Upload Photo |
| Loaning Hill | | | | 56°23′03″N 2°59′34″W | Category C(S) | 8828 | Upload Photo |
| Lochmalony Doocot | | | | 56°22′05″N 3°01′44″W | Category B | 8830 | Upload Photo |
| Rathillet Farm-Steading | | | | 56°22′31″N 3°02′19″W | Category B | 8791 | Upload Photo |
| Mountquhanie Stables | | | | 56°22′45″N 3°03′31″W | Category B | 8835 | Upload Photo |
| Mountquhanie Doocot (Attached To N Range Of Stableblock) | | | | 56°22′45″N 3°03′32″W | Category B | 8836 | Upload Photo |
| Mountquhanie Home Farm | | | | 56°22′50″N 3°03′30″W | Category C(S) | 8838 | Upload Photo |
| Rathillet House | | | | 56°22′29″N 3°02′23″W | Category B | 8790 | Upload Photo |
| Mountquhanie Castle | | | | 56°22′44″N 3°03′29″W | Category B | 8834 | Upload another image |
| Mountquanie Ice House | | | | 56°22′44″N 3°03′41″W | Category C(S) | 8837 | Upload Photo |
| Sandford Hill Hotel | | | | 56°24′21″N 2°57′48″W | Category B | 8839 | Upload another image |
| The Wynd (Lord Kilmany - Formerly Occupied By Stalker, Empty In 1969) Kilmany | | | | 56°23′01″N 2°59′35″W | Category C(S) | 8786 | Upload Photo |
| Newington Steading | | | | 56°21′28″N 3°03′34″W | Category C(S) | 8841 | Upload Photo |
| Rathillet Doocot | | | | 56°22′31″N 3°02′22″W | Category B | 8875 | Upload Photo |
| Grayson House Rathillet | | | | 56°22′38″N 3°01′45″W | Category C(S) | 8789 | Upload Photo |
| Stirton Railway Bridge (Rathillet) | | | | 56°22′51″N 3°02′14″W | Category C(S) | 13485 | Upload another image |
| Lochmalony House | | | | 56°22′07″N 3°01′34″W | Category B | 8829 | Upload Photo |
| Newcairnie Farmhouse | | | | 56°21′38″N 3°02′28″W | Category B | 8831 | Upload Photo |
| Newcairnie Steading | | | | 56°21′39″N 3°02′29″W | Category C(S) | 8832 | Upload Photo |
| Kilmany House. (Formerly Kilmany Cottage) | | | | 56°23′07″N 2°59′40″W | Category B | 8787 | Upload Photo |
| Kimany Parish Kirkyard | | | | 56°23′03″N 2°59′32″W | Category B | 8827 | Upload Photo |
| Mountquhanie House | | | | 56°22′40″N 3°03′25″W | Category B | 8833 | Upload Photo |
| Newington House Including Garden Wall | | | | 56°21′32″N 3°03′32″W | Category B | 8840 | Upload Photo |
| Kilmany Post Office | | | | 56°23′02″N 2°59′37″W | Category C(S) | 8785 | Upload Photo |

== Key ==
The scheme for classifying buildings in Scotland is:

- Category A: "buildings of national or international importance, either architectural or historic; or fine, little-altered examples of some particular period, style or building type."
- Category B: "buildings of regional or more than local importance; or major examples of some particular period, style or building type, which may have been altered."
- Category C: "buildings of local importance; lesser examples of any period, style, or building type, as originally constructed or moderately altered; and simple traditional buildings which group well with other listed buildings."

In March 2016 there were 47,288 listed buildings in Scotland. Of these, 8% were Category A, and 50% were Category B, with the remaining 42% being Category C.

== See also ==
- List of listed buildings in Fife
