= Lady Leng Memorial Chapel =

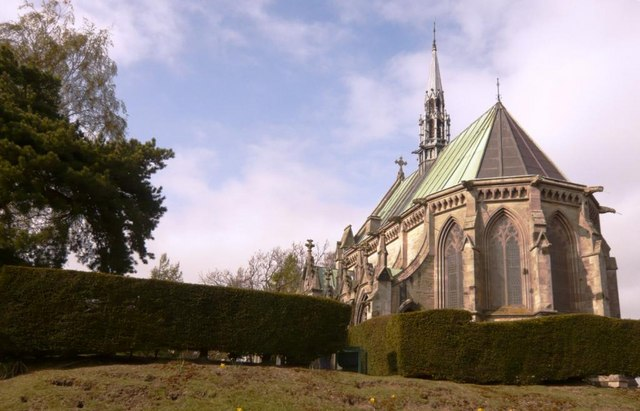
- View from the south
- Lady Leng Memorial Chapel
- 56°25′13″N 2°54′41″W
- Location: Leuchars, Fife
- Country: Scotland

Architecture
- Architect: Thomas Martin Cappon
- Completed: 1897 (129 years ago)

Lady Leng Memorial Chapel (also known as Vicarsford Cemetery Chapel) is a church building in Leuchars, Fife, Scotland. Built between 1895 and 1897, to a design by Thomas Martin Cappon, it is now a Category A listed building. Historic Environment Scotland describes it as "a fine and rare example of a small ecclesiastical building type".

The building is also one of the few non-denominational chapels in Scotland. It was built by politician John Leng as a memorial to his wife, Lady Emily Leng, with the Saint-Chapelle, Paris, being the inspiration.

The adjacent Vicarsford Cemetery is Category B listed.

== See also ==
- List of Category A listed buildings in Fife
