= Letham, Fife =

Village in Fife, Scotland

Coordinates: 56.3178°N 3.122°W

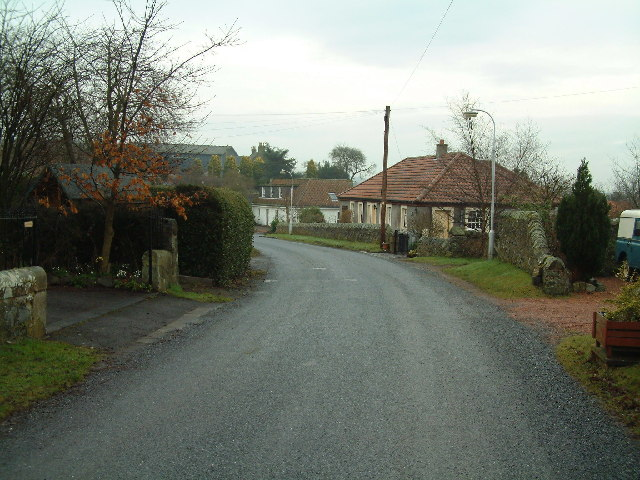
Letham

Letham is a small village in Fife, Scotland, located just off the A92, around 5 miles from Cupar. According to the 2001 Census, Letham has 138 residents, although this has increased in the previous years.

Its school, Letham Primary School, educates around 35 pupils, between the ages of 5 and 12. The school building itself is over 130 years old, and built mainly from sandstone which was quarried only 200 metres away from the school.

Cunnoquhie House is a late 18th-century classical mansion located just north of Letham. It was built for George Paterson of Cunnoquhie, and is a category A listed building.
