= Newburgh railway station =

Former railway station in Scotland

Newburgh

General information
- Location: Newburgh, Fife, London and North Eastern Railway; Scotland
- Coordinates: 56.3481°N 3.2504°W
- Grid reference: NO234183
- Platforms: 2

Other information
- Status: Disused

History
- Original company: Edinburgh and Northern Railway
- Pre-grouping: North British Railway
- Post-grouping: London and North Eastern Railway

Key dates
- 17 May 1848: First station opened
- August 1906: Resited
- 19 September 1955: Closed
Location

See also Parbold railway station which was originally named "Newburgh railway station".

Newburgh railway station in the town of Newburgh, Fife was closed in 1955. The station sat on the Perth to Edinburgh Waverley line which is still used today. There is an active campaign run by the local community to reopen the station.

== History ==
There have been several railway stations serving the town of Newburgh, Fife. The original was opened on 17 May 1848 by the Edinburgh and Northern Railway, on their line from Ladybank to Hilton Junction, near Perth. This station lasted until August 1906, when a larger replacement station was opened.

This replacement station became a junction station on 25 January 1909, when the Newburgh and North Fife Railway company opened a line from Newburgh to Dundee. This route called at Lindores, Luthrie, and Kilmany, and was an attempt to provide a competitive service between Perth and Dundee via the south of the River Tay. The route diverged at a triangle junction just south of St Fort station. This alternative route to Dundee from Perth was not, however, a great success, as journey times were considerably longer.

In July 1933, the line from Newburgh to Bridge of Earn was converted to single track. By this time, the station was in ownership by the London and North Eastern Railway. From 1948 the station was under British Railways ownership. In February 1951, the Newburgh (Glenburnie Junction) to St Fort line closed to passenger services. The station's history continued mainly uneventfully until 19 September 1955 when the station closed to passengers (along with the other intermediate stations between Bridge of Earn and Ladybank), but remained open for goods purposes.

On 13 May 1960, Newburgh (Glenburnie Junction) to Lindores closed completely, and Newburgh to Glenburnie Junction was singled, leaving a single line route between Ladybank and Perth. St Fort to Lindores remained open for freight until October 1964. Newburgh station loop remained intact, however, and in December 1971 was signalled for bi-directional working. This loop and the, by then, decaying Newburgh sidings were both removed in October 1980.

From October 1975, British Rail reopened the line to regular passenger traffic, although trains did not call at intermediate stations. This was an attempt to provide an alternative route between Edinburgh and Perth shorter than the route via Stirling, which had been used since the closure of the main line between the cities in January 1970. The former main line had taken a direct route via Kinross and Glenfarg. The reopening of the Ladybank route for passenger trains once again allowed journeys to be made between Perth and Edinburgh without the need to change trains, although journeys were still slower than via the former main line.

== Present and future ==
Today the station lies derelict - the platform and main building are both still intact, although gutted of all furnishings. It has been suggested many times that the station should be re-opened, along with Abernethy and Bridge of Earn, as these places have slowly been developing over the past 25 years. The line from Ladybank to Perth forms part of the Edinburgh to Inverness Line.

Today, there is an active campaign to reopen a station at Newburgh. An appraisal directed by the Scottish Transport Appraisal Guidance (STAG) has been submitted to Transport Scotland for consideration with a view to securing government funding for this small project. The Scottish Green Party supported these ideas in their 2026 manifesto.

For now, though, the train service is replaced permanently by a bus, and to operate stopping services on the line may require loops in certain places (possibly even redoubling, as the line is already heavily used by Inverness / Perth - Edinburgh Waverley services). Occasionally, freight, London-bound trains and the Caledonian Sleeper services use this line if the route via Stirling is closed for maintenance. A few railtours have also been known to traverse the Newburgh line.

== Services ==
Preceding station	Historical railways	Following station
Glenburnie; Line open, station closed	Edinburgh and Northern Railway; North British Railway	Abernethy; Line open, station closed
