= List of listed buildings in Forgan, Fife =

This is a list of listed buildings in the parish of Forgan in Fife, Scotland.

== List ==
Name	Location	Date listed	Grid ref. (Note: Sometimes known as OSGB36, the grid reference (where provided) is based on the British national grid reference system used by the Ordnance Survey. • "Guide to National Grid". Ordnance Survey. • "Get-a-map". Ordnance Survey.)	Geo-coordinates	Notes	LB number (Note: Historic Environment Scotland assign a unique alphanumeric identifier to each designated site in Scotland, for listed buildings this always begins with "LB", for example "LB12345".)	Image
Kirkton House				56°25′23″N 2°53′58″W	Category B	10803	Upload Photo
St Fort Home Farm, The Greens Cottages				56°25′10″N 2°57′01″W	Category B	10806	Upload Photo
Forgan Manse And Offices				56°25′27″N 2°54′39″W	Category C(S)	10801	Upload Photo
Causewayhead Farmhouse				56°26′17″N 2°55′08″W	Category C(S)	10805	Upload Photo
Newton Farm Steading				56°24′35″N 2°58′21″W	Category C(S)	10808	Upload Photo
Morton House Burialground				56°25′23″N 2°52′04″W	Category B	10809	Upload Photo
Morton House				56°25′25″N 2°51′58″W	Category C(S)	13725	Upload Photo
Kirkton House Doocot				56°25′24″N 2°53′58″W	Category B	10804	Upload Photo
St Fort Doocot				56°25′19″N 2°56′56″W	Category B	13724	Upload another image
Wormit, Naughton Road, Wormit Farm Including Farmhouse And Steading And Boundary Walls				56°25′13″N 2°58′55″W	Category C(S)	51128	Upload Photo
Mileplate Near Forgan Church				56°25′27″N 2°55′21″W	Category B	13011	Upload Photo
Bridge Over Former Railway Track To Morton				56°25′34″N 2°52′10″W	Category C(S)	13726	Upload another image
Forgan Parish Kirk				56°25′25″N 2°55′18″W	Category B	10800	Upload another image
Boulterhall, Tomb				56°24′32″N 2°56′47″W	Category B	10807	Upload Photo

== Key ==
The scheme for classifying buildings in Scotland is:

- Category A: "buildings of national or international importance, either architectural or historic; or fine, little-altered examples of some particular period, style or building type."
- Category B: "buildings of regional or more than local importance; or major examples of some particular period, style or building type, which may have been altered."
- Category C: "buildings of local importance; lesser examples of any period, style, or building type, as originally constructed or moderately altered; and simple traditional buildings which group well with other listed buildings."

In March 2016 there were 47,288 listed buildings in Scotland. Of these, 8% were Category A, and 50% were Category B, with the remaining 42% being Category C.

== See also ==
- List of listed buildings in Fife
