= Lindores railway station =

Disused railway station in Lindores, Fife

Lindores
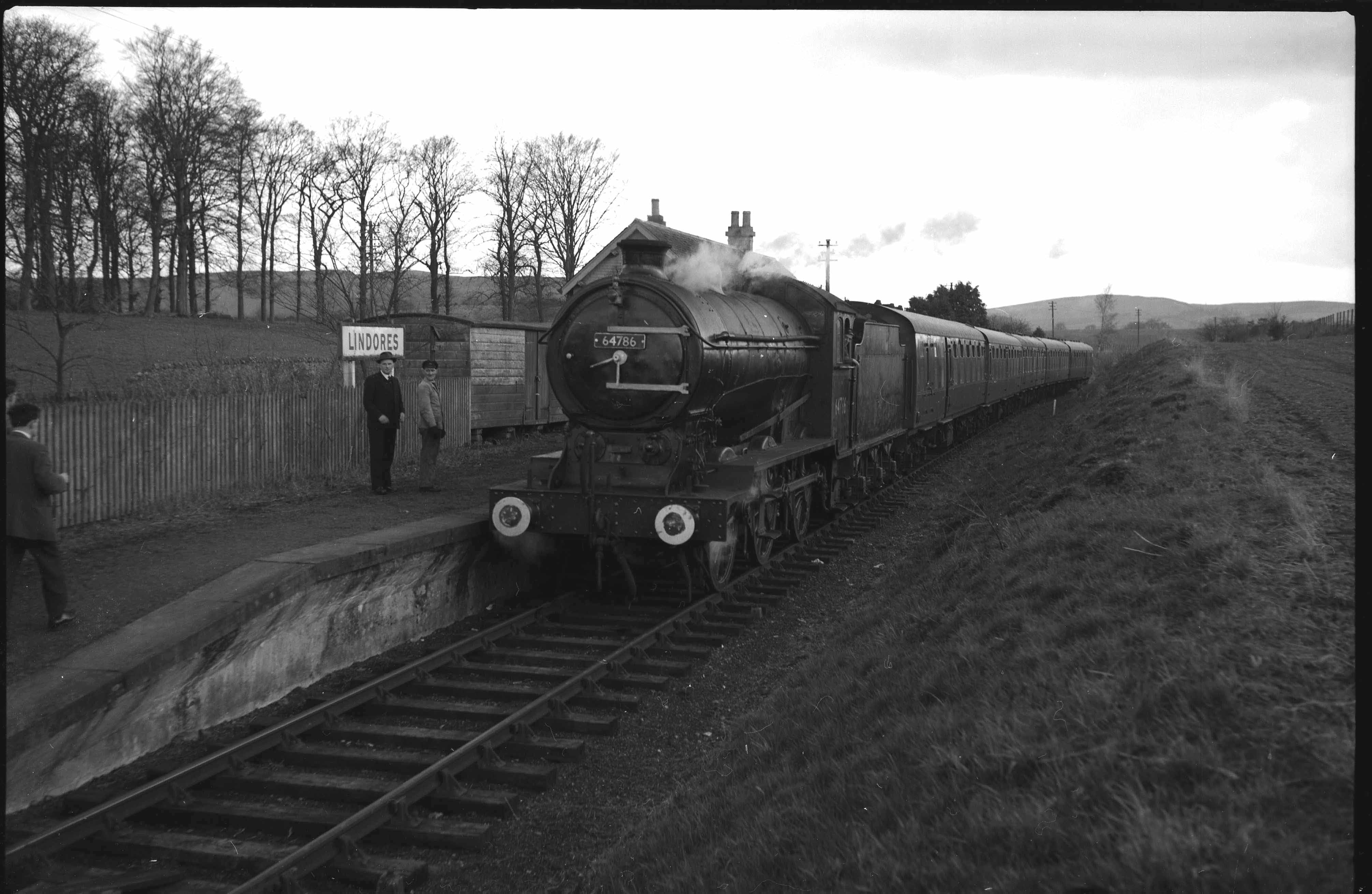

General information
- Location: Lindores, Fife; Scotland
- Coordinates: 56.3406°N 3.1825°W
- Grid reference: NO270101
- Platforms: 1

Other information
- Status: Disused

History
- Original company: Newburgh and North Fife Railway
- Post-grouping: LNER; British Railways (Scottish Region)

Key dates
- 25 January 1909: Opened
- 12 February 1951: Closed
Location

Lindores railway station served the village of Lindores, Fife, Scotland from 1909 to 1951 on the Newburgh and North Fife Railway.

== History ==
The station opened on 25 January 1909 by the Newburgh and North Fife Railway. The station closed to both passengers and goods traffic on 12 February 1951.

Preceding station	Disused railways	Following station
Glenburnie; Line and station closed	Newburgh and North Fife Railway	Luthrie; Line and station closed
