= Dundee TMD =

Railway maintenance depot in Dundee, Scotland

Coordinates: 56°27′14″N 2°59′02″W

- Interactive map of Dundee TMD

Location
- Location: Dundee, Scotland, UK

Characteristics
- Owner: British Rail
- Depot code: DE (1973 -)
- Type: DMU

Dundee TMD was a traction maintenance depot located in Dundee, Scotland. The depot, in Dundee's West End was situated beside Buckingham Junction, on the Glasgow–Dundee line and near the closed Dundee Esplanade railway station on the East Coast Main Line's northern extension.

The depot code was DE.

== Allocation ==
The depot was noted for having an allocation of Class 06 shunters, along with some first generation DMUs.
