= Glenburnie railway station =

Disused railway station in Glenburnie, Fife

Coordinates: 56.3405°N 3.2126°W

Glenburnie

General information
- Location: Glenburnie, Fife; Scotland
- Platforms: 1

Other information
- Status: Disused

History
- Original company: Edinburgh and Northern Railway
- Pre-grouping: Edinburgh and Northern Railway

Key dates
- 9 December 1847: Opened
- 17 May 1848: Closed
Location

Glenburnie railway station was a temporary terminus that served the area of Glenburnie, Fife, Scotland from 1847 to 1848 on the Edinburgh and Northern Railway and the Newburgh and North Fife Railway.

== History ==
The station opened on 9 December 1847 by the Edinburgh and Northern Railway. It was a short lived terminus of the Newburgh and North Fife Railway, until Newburgh opened five months later, with a siding that served a loading bank to the west and a signal box also to the west. The station closed on 17 May 1848.

== Services ==
| Preceding station | Historical railways | Following station |
|---|---|---|
| Collessie; Line open, station closed | Edinburgh and Northern Railway; North British Railway | Newburgh; Line open, station closed |
| Newburgh; Line open, station closed | Newburgh and North Fife Railway; North British Railway | Lindores; Line and station closed |
