= Luthrie =

Luthrie Luthraidh
- village
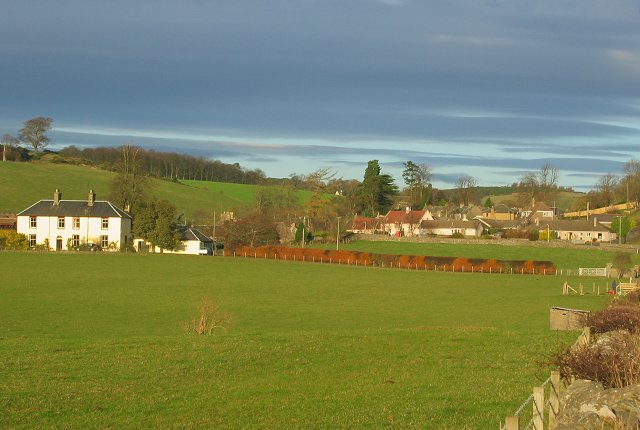

- Location within Fife
- Coordinates: 56.364638°N 3.084701°W
- Country: Scotland
- County: Fife
- Parish: Creich
- Postal code: KY15

Luthrie is a village in the parish of Creich in Fife, Scotland. A small stream shown on maps as Windygates Burn (but known locally as Luthrie Burn) flows through the village and occasionally floods.

== Notable buildings ==
=== Listed ===
There are two listed buildings in the village, both Grade C(S):

- Old Smiddy House c. 1790 56.36374°N 3.08421°W
- Lower Luthrie House, a two-storey, four-window harled dated c. 1800 (marked Luthrie House on most maps) 56.36239°N 3.08266°W

=== Other ===
- Old School House 56.36421°N 3.08540°W
- Village Hall 56.36417°N 3.08442°W

== Transportation ==
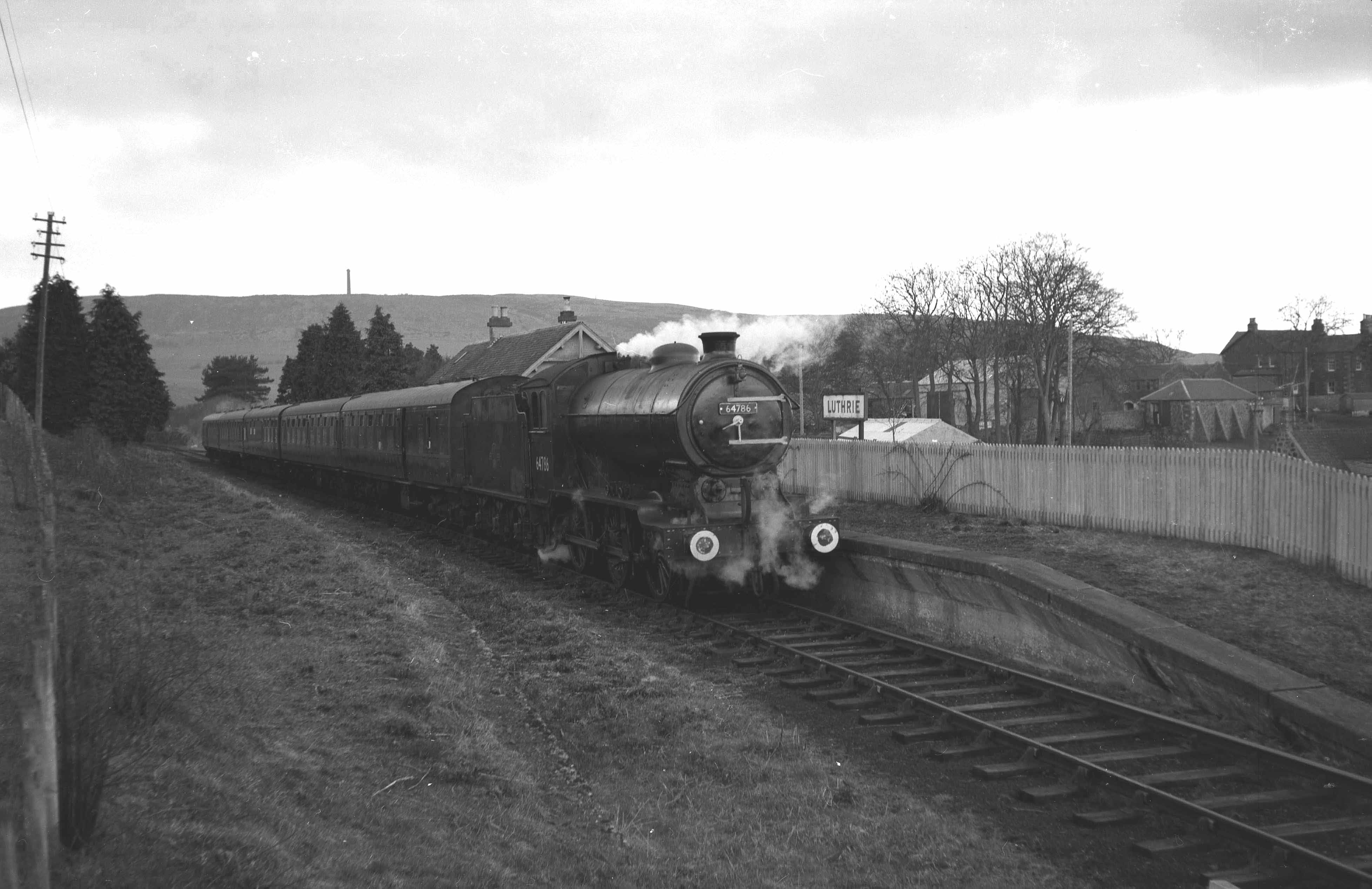
The railway station

Luthrie had a station on the Newburgh and North Fife Railway which was open to passengers between 1909 and 1951. The railway has since been lifted.

== See also ==
- List of listed buildings in Creich, Fife
- Newburgh and North Fife Railway
