= St Fort railway station =

Disused railway station in St Fort, Fife

Coordinates: 56.407172°N 2.957163°W

St. Fort

General information
- Location: St Fort, Forgan, Fife; Scotland
- Platforms: 2

Other information
- Status: Disused

History
- Original company: North British Railway
- Post-grouping: LNER; British Rail (Scottish Region)

Key dates
- 1 June 1878: Opened
- 6 September 1965: Closed
Location

St. Fort railway station served the civil parish of Forgan, Fife, Scotland from 1878 to 1965 on the Tay Bridge Line and Newburgh and North Fife Railway.

== History ==
The station opened on 1 June 1878 by the North British Railway. To the west was the goods yard and to the east was the signal box. This was replaced in 1909 by the north junction box. The station closed on 6 September 1965.

Preceding station	Disused railways	Following station
Terminus	Newburgh and North Fife Railway	Kilmany; Line and station closed
	Historical railways	
Dundee Esplanade; Line open, station closed	North British Railway; Tay Bridge Line	Leuchars; Line and station open
