= Luthrie railway station =

Disused railway station in Luthrie, Fife

Coordinates: 56.355512°N 3.078086°W

Luthrie
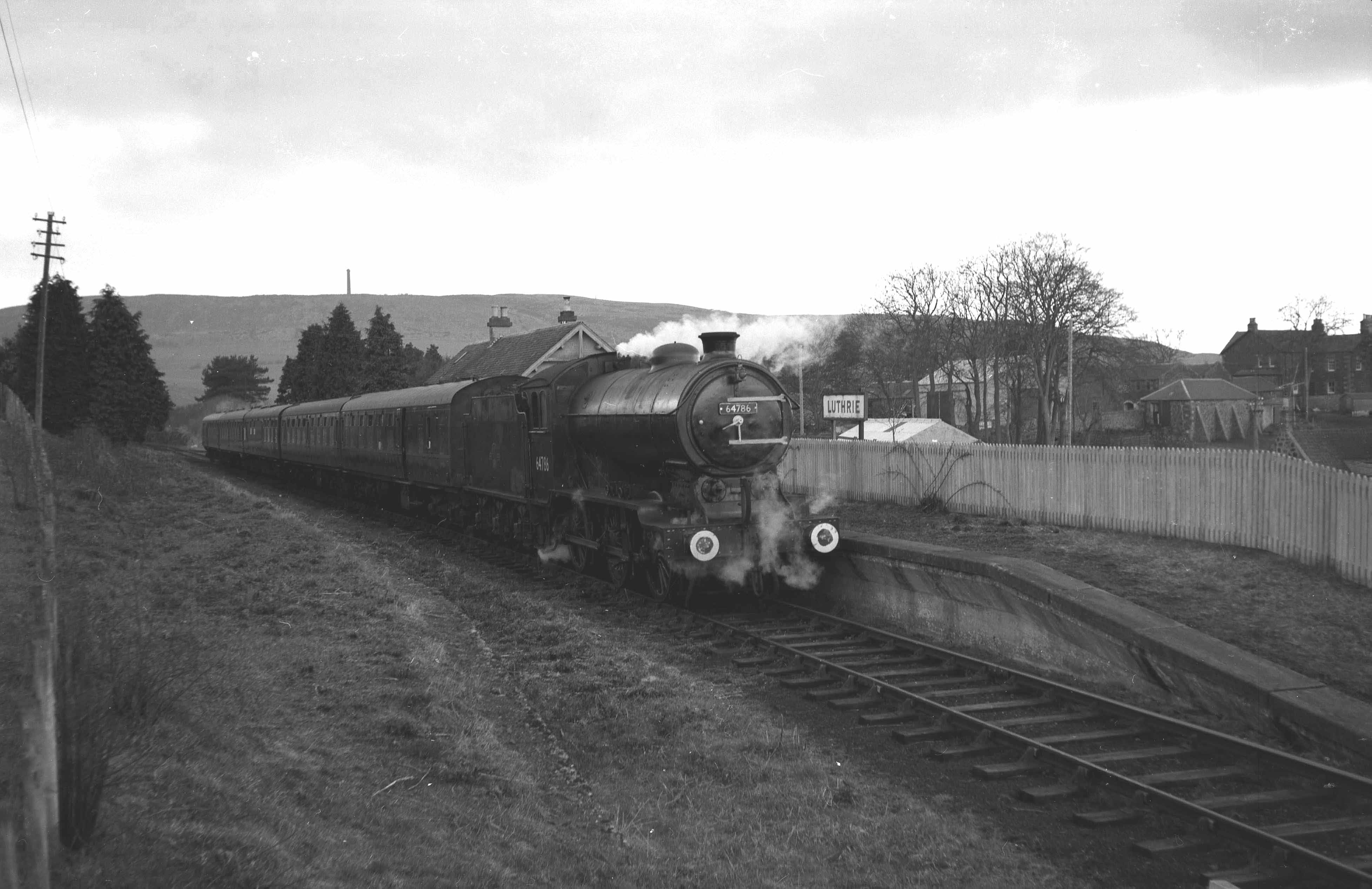

General information
- Location: Luthrie, Fife; Scotland
- Platforms: 2

Other information
- Status: Disused

History
- Original company: Newburgh and North Fife Railway
- Pre-grouping: Newburgh and North Fife Railway
- Post-grouping: LNER; British Railways (Scottish Region)

Key dates
- 25 January 1909: Opened
- 12 February 1951: Closed
Location

Luthrie railway station served the village of Luthrie, Fife, Scotland from 1909 to 1951 on the Newburgh and North Fife Railway.

== History ==
The station was opened on 25 January 1909 by the Newburgh and North Fife Railway.

To the west was the goods yard. The signal box closed in 1928 and was replaced by a ground frame, allowing access to the goods yard. The station was host to a LNER camping coach from 1935 to 1938.

The line and station closed to passengers on 12 February 1951. The line closed to goods traffic on 5 October 1964.

Preceding station	Disused railways	Following station
Lindores; Line and station closed	Newburgh and North Fife Railway	Kilmany; Line and station closed
