= Abernethy, Perth and Kinross =

Village in Perth and Kinross, Scotland

Coordinates: 56.33302°N 3.31163°W

Abernethy: Scottish Gaelic: Obar Neithich
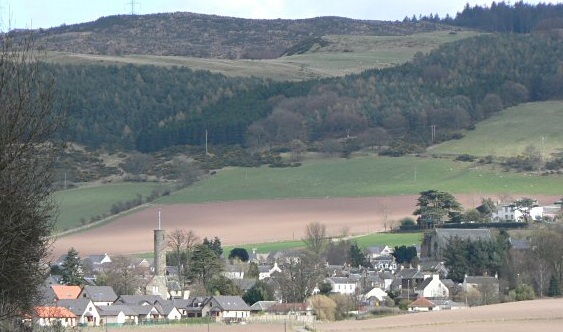
- The village of Abernethy viewed from the north

- Location within Perth and Kinross
- Population: 1,390 (2020)
- OS grid reference: NO189163
  - Edinburgh: 27 mi (43 km)
  - London: 358 mi (576 km)
- Council area: Perth and Kinross
- Lieutenancy area: Perth and Kinross
- Country: Scotland
- Sovereign state: United Kingdom
- Post town: PERTH
- Postcode district: PH2 9xx
- Dialling code: 01738 85
- Police: Scotland
- Fire: Scottish
- Ambulance: Scottish
- UK Parliament: Perth and Kinross-shire
- Scottish Parliament: Perthshire South and Kinross-shire

Abernethy is a village and former burgh in the Perth and Kinross council area and historic county of Perthshire, in the east central Lowlands of Scotland. The village is situated in rural Strathearn, 8 miles (13 km) south-east of the city of Perth, near the River Earn's confluence with the River Tay and on the northern edge of the Ochil Hills.

Formerly the site of a number of Roman encampments, Abernethy became an important Pictish religious and political centre. The village was the setting for the Treaty of Abernethy, where Malcolm Canmore gave allegiance to William the Conqueror and its mediaeval round tower marks the site of a former abbey and, later, collegiate church.

The civil parish of Abernethy also contains the nearby settlement of Aberargie and traditionally extends to Mugdrum Island in the Firth of Tay. It is part of the Almond and Earn ward for elections to Perth and Kinross Council

== History ==
=== Etymology ===
Abernethy, recorded in the 10th century as Aburnethige, means 'mouth of the river Nethy'. The first element of the name is the Pictish word aber 'river mouth'. The river-name Nethy is from the Celtic root nect- 'pure, clean'. The Nethy Burn flows down from the Ochil Hills past the present village. The Gaelic form of the name is Obar Neithich.

Near to Abernethy lies the small settlement of Catochil, whose name is first attested in a sixteenth-century copy of a text from 1295, as Cathehill, and again in 1508 as Catoichill. This place-name too is thought to be from Pictish, or its close relative Common Brittonic, from the elements *ced ("woodland") and *ogel ("high", its form influenced by the name of the Ochil Hills among which it lies).

=== Early history ===
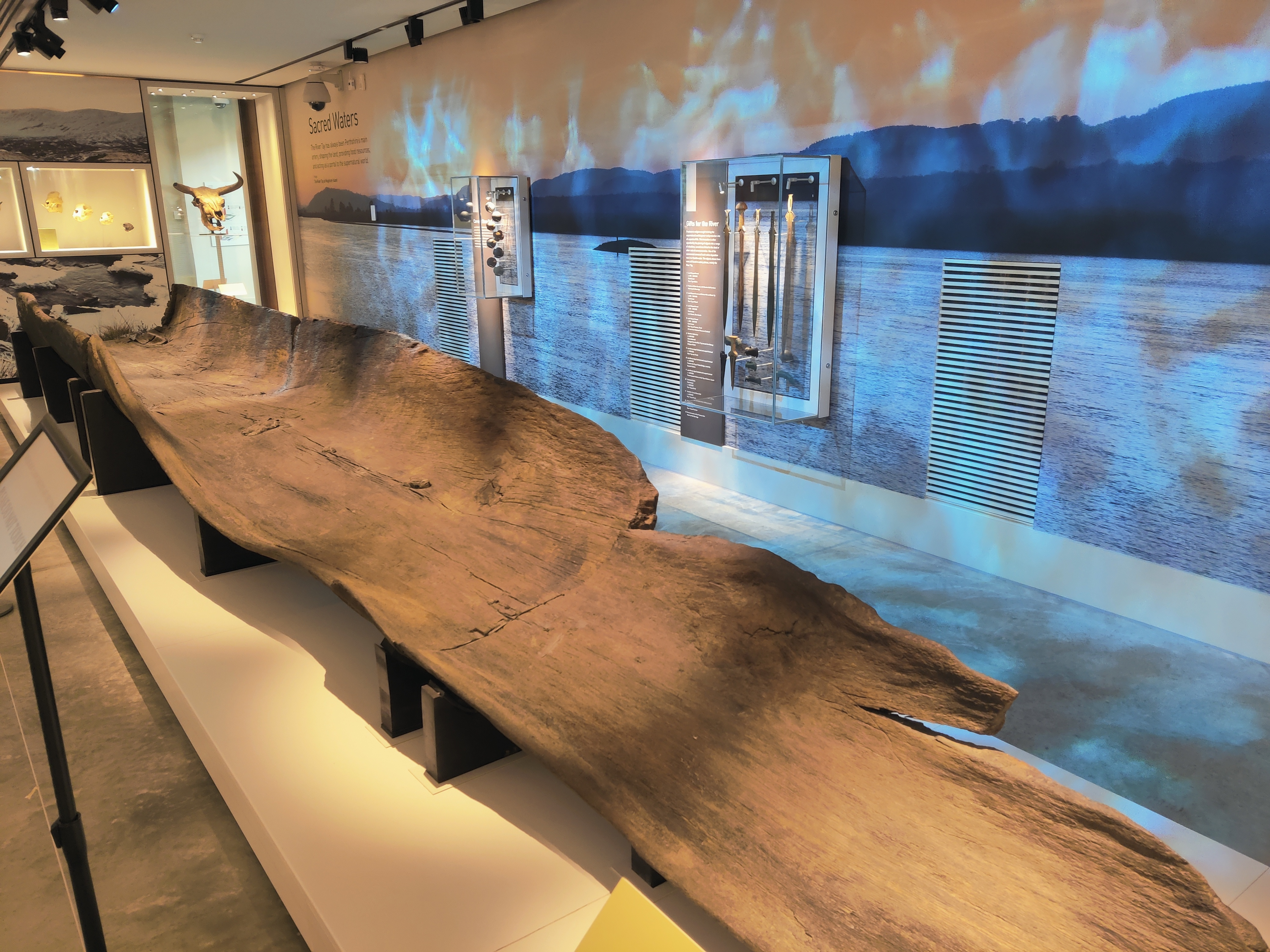
The Carpow logboat on display at Perth Museum.

There is evidence of early settlement in the area, with a Bronze Age log boat being discovered at Carpow in 2001, believed to date from around 1,000 BC. The Carpow boat is one of the best-preserved examples in Britain, and the second-oldest example of a boat recovered in Scotland. Remains of suspected pre-historic stone circles have been discovered to the north and south of the village. Castle Law was the site of an Iron Age hillfort, first excavated in the late 19th century.

A group of Roman sites within the village have been given the name "the Abernethy complex", including later use of the fortress at Castle Law and the site of the former Carpow Roman Fort to the east of the village.

=== Middle Ages ===
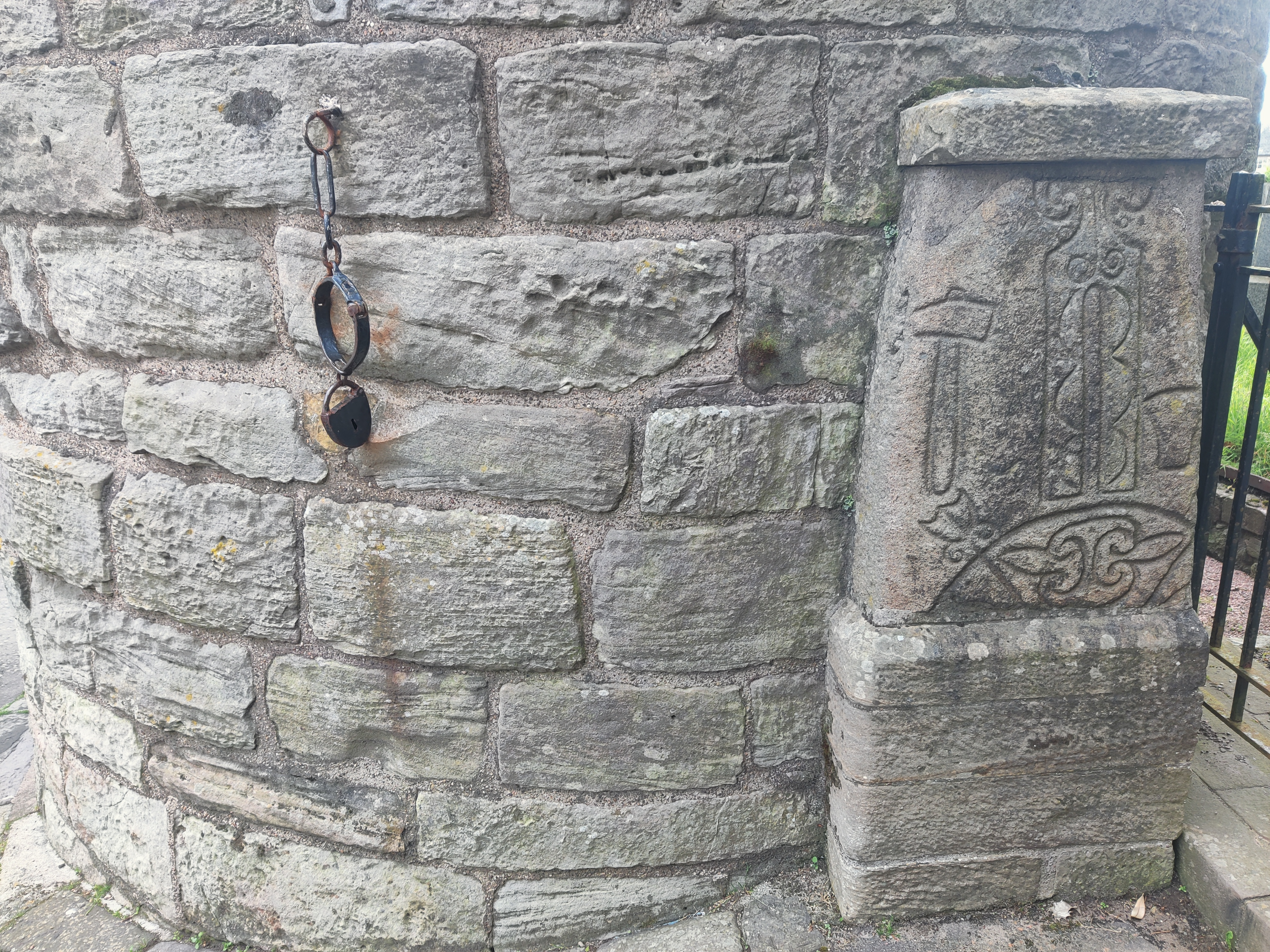
Pictish stone and jougs near the churchyard.

The village was once the "capital" (or at least a major religious and political centre) of the kingdom of the Picts. The parish church, which sits on land given by Nechtan,^{a} king of the Picts, is dedicated to Saint Brigid of Kildare (fl. 451–525), and the church is said to have been founded by Dairlugdach, second abbess of Kildare, one of early Christian Ireland's major monasteries.

Several pieces of Pictish or early medieval sculpture have been found in Abernethy, including an incomplete Pictish symbol stone attached to the base of the round tower. The location "Afarnach's Hall" referred to in the earliest mediaeval Arthurian literature is usually identified as Abernethy.

Abernethy is believed to have been the seat of an early Pictish bishopric, its diocese extending westward along Strathearn. In the 12th century the bishop's seat was moved to Muthill, then Dunblane, so that Abernethy, no longer being a residential bishopric is today listed by the Catholic Church as a titular see.

In 1072, Abernethy was the site of the Treaty of Abernethy concluded between William the Conqueror and Malcolm III of Scotland. Alexander de Abernethy maintained a connection to the area.

Abernethy remained the site of a small priory of Augustinian canons, founded 1272. In the 15th century, this priory was suppressed in favour of a collegiate church under the patronage of the Douglas Earls of Angus. Remains of the collegiate church survived until 1802 within the present village graveyard, when they were replaced by the present plain red sandstone church, which is still dedicated to Saint Brigid.

=== Modern history ===
Abernethy was granted a charter as a burgh of barony in 1476 by the 5th Earl of Angus, a status confirmed in 1628 by the 11th Earl. The Earl of Angus and Lord Abernethy have become subsidiary titles of the Dukes of Hamilton. It later became a police burgh and held its burgh status and instruments of local government until the Local Government (Scotland) Act 1973.

In 1933, Powrie Park was gifted to the burgh by William Powrie as a memorial and is maintained as common good land by Perth and Kinross Council.

In October 1909, future Prime Minister Winston Churchill spoke at a political rally in the village, which was protested by a group of Suffragettes including Adela Pankhurst.

In the Second World War, the village hosted a camp for Polish forces and was the destination for a number of evacuees. In 2012, the London Olympics torch relay passed through Abernethy as part of its progress around the British Isles.

== Culture and community ==
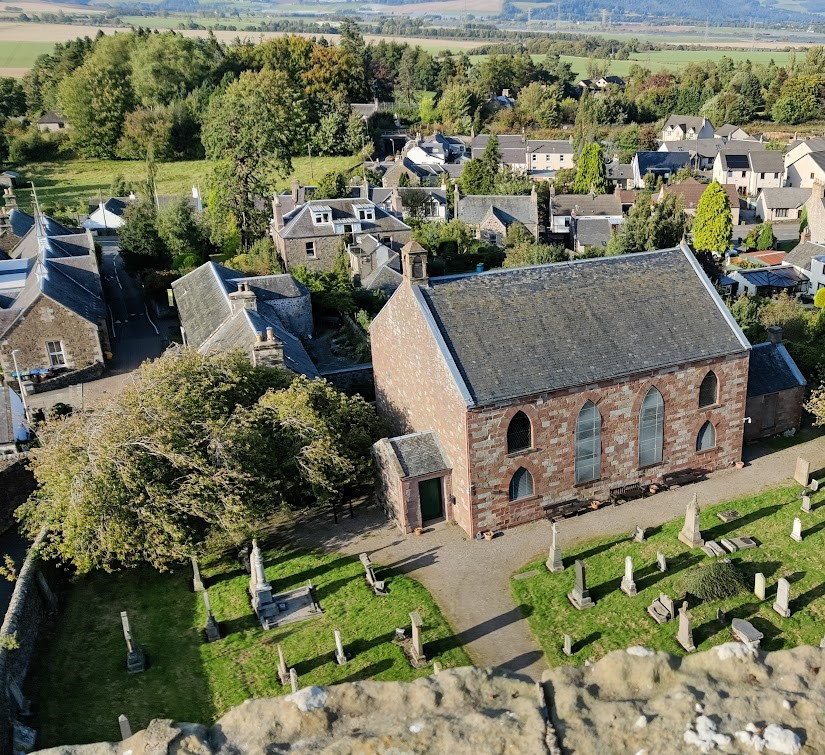
Kirk of St Bride, the parish church

Abernethy was formerly associated with agriculture, including soft fruit production, salmon fishing and weaving.

A general store is found in the village's Main Street. The local post office was replaced in 2009 with a mobile service. The village also hosts a public house, museum, garden centre, public park and heritage gardens.

A Gala / Fete Day is held annually on the first or second Saturday in June, with a race to the top of nearby Castle Law taking place the following day.

=== Museum of Abernethy ===
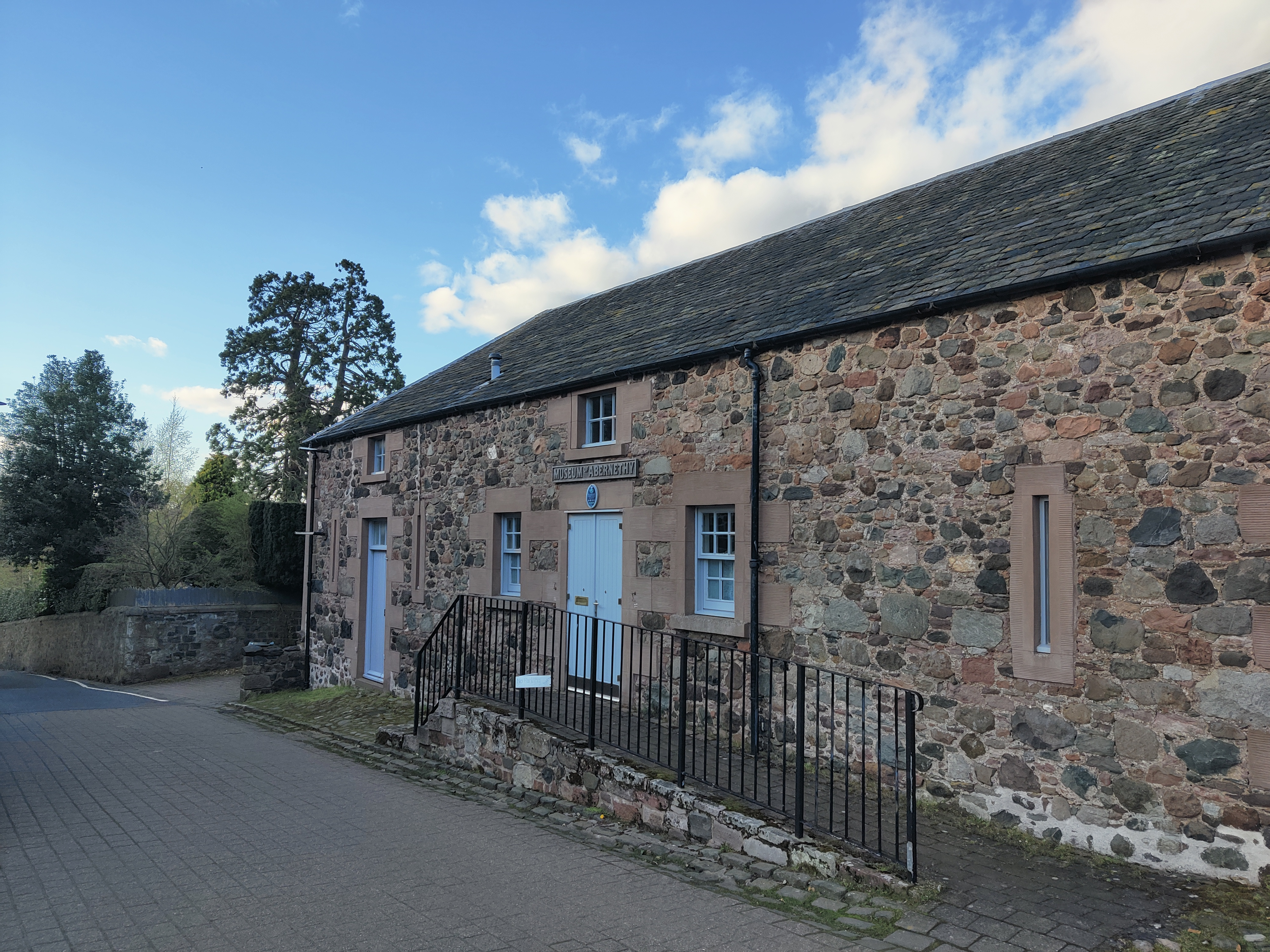
The Museum of Abernethy

The Museum of Abernethy in the village opened in May 2000 by Magnus Magnusson, former chairman of the Ancient Monuments Board for Scotland, and is open to the public during May to September each year. It also holds a key to the round tower. In 2025, the museum celebrated its 25th anniversary with a number of events.

=== Religion ===
Abernethy has an ancient history back to the earliest days of Christianity in Scotland, and a pivotal role in shaping it, albeit in a gently far-reaching way.

The Culdees (from the Irish Céilí Dé, meaning "Spouses of God") were ascetic Christian monks and hermits who lived in Ireland, Scotland, and Wales during the Middle Ages. Operating between the 8th and 13th centuries, they lived communal, spiritual lives connected to monasteries and cathedrals without strictly adhering to traditional monastic vows. The Culdees played a prominent role in shaping early Scottish spirituality, and their legacy survives in several notable ways across the UK today. Prior to The Reformation, the village fell within the diocese of Dunblane, part of the Roman Catholic Church. As Scotland moved from Catholicism to Protestantism, the Scottish Episcopal Church was established, with the village continuing as part of a Protestant diocese of Dunblane. The modern Scottish Episcopal Church diocese has changed and extended, becoming the Diocese of St Andrews, Dunkeld and Dunblane, part of the worldwide Anglican communion.

The village falls within the Church of Scotland's ecclesiastical parish of Abernethy, Dron and Arngask. The village's parish church is known as the Kirk of St Bride and dates to the 19th century, built on the site of a former mediaeval church and monastery. The church contains a number of stained glass windows, including two by the artist William Wilson.

The former South United Free church building, constructed in 1866, has been deconsecrated and is now in private ownership. The former Abernethy Free church, later the North United Free church, was converted for use into a factory and demolished in the 1990s.

=== Symbols ===
Abernethy Community Council matriculated a coat of arms with the Lord Lyon in 1991. It is blazoned "Parted per chevron and in chief per pale 1st Azure, a salmon ontournee and embowed Argent, 2nd Argent a raspberry fruit Gules with bract Vert, in base Vert a representation of Abernethy Tower Argent masoned and windowed Sable, port of the Last; overall a chevron wavy per pale Argent and Azure charged with two barrulets counterchanged."

=== Twinning ===
Abernethy is twinned with Grisy-Suisnes in the Île-de-France.

== Landmarks ==
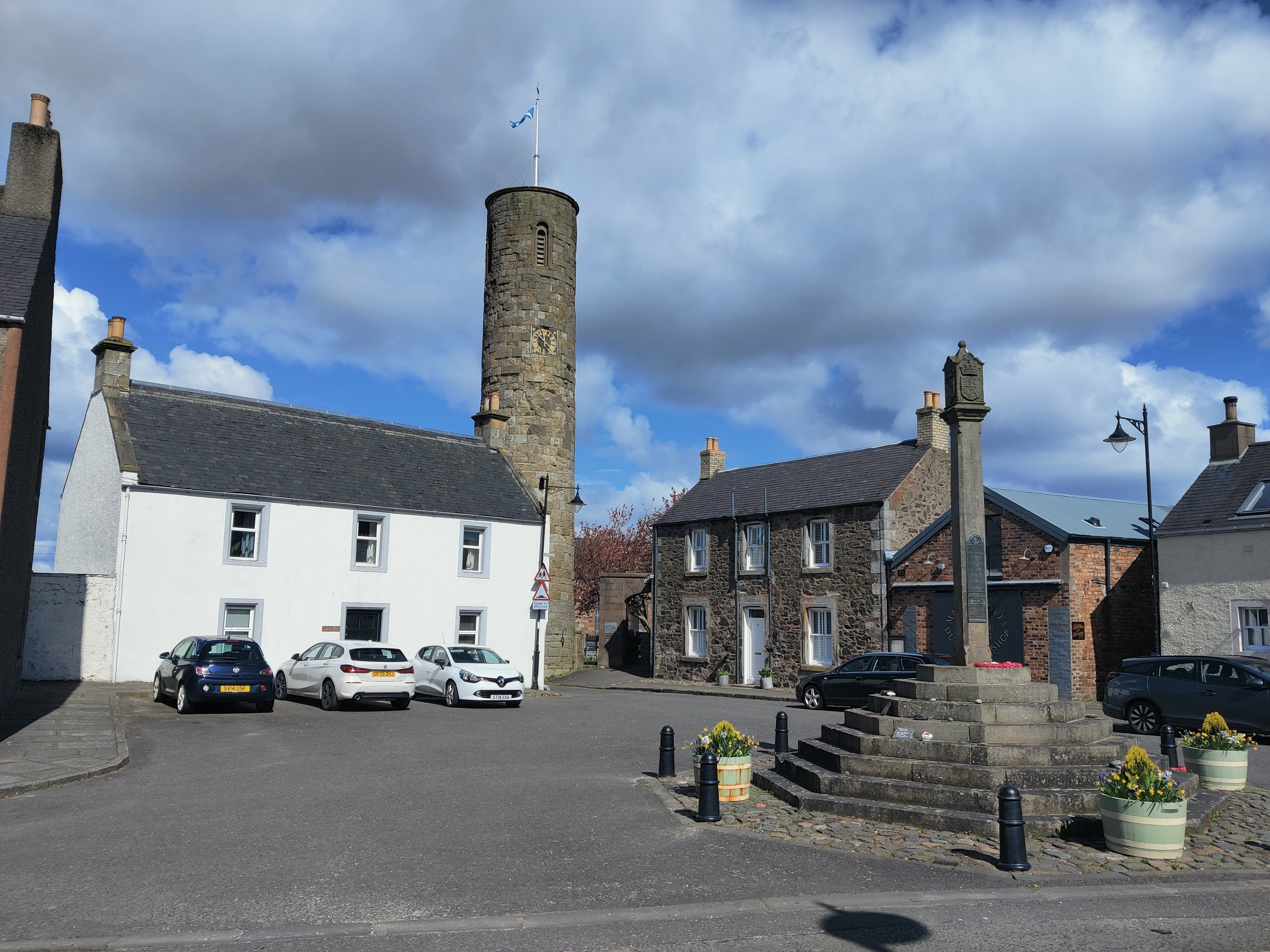
Abernethy mercat cross and round tower

The historic core of Abernethy is designated as a conservation area with protections against development. A number of listed buildings are also designated within the village and the wider parish.

=== Abernethy Round Tower ===
The village has one of Scotland's two surviving Irish-style round towers (the other is at Brechin, Angus); both are in the care of Historic Environment Scotland. The tower stands 74 ft (23 m) high, and it is possible to climb to the top, using a modern metal spiral staircase (the tower originally had several wooden floors linked by ladders). The tower was evidently built in two stages (shown by a change in the masonry), and probably dates from the 11th to early 12th centuries.

=== Abernethy cross ===
The village's war memorial is modelled on a former market cross and was unveiled in the village's square in 1921. It records the names of 30 men from Abernethy who died in the First World War and the names of a further eight who died in the Second World War were added later.

=== Balvaird Castle ===
The 15th century Balvaird Castle, a mediaeval tower house, is located outside of the village.

== Governance ==
Abernethy and its surrounding district are represented by Abernethy community council. The local authority is Perth and Kinross Council with Abernethy falling within the Almond and Earn ward, one of twelve in the council area. The ward elects three councillors.

For elections to the Parliament of the United Kingdom, Abernethy is part of the Perth and Kinross-shire constituency in the House of Commons. For elections to the devolved Scottish Parliament, it is part of the Perthshire South and Kinross-shire constituency and the Mid Scotland and Fife region.

=== Historic local government ===
The main settlement of Abernethy was created as a burgh since 1476, while a wider parish included neighbouring small settlements such as Aberargie and had local government functions until 1930. The parish partly extended from Perthshire into neighbouring Fife until boundary changes.

The burgh was held initially as a burgh of barony under the Earl of Angus who held the title of Lord Abernethy. Both titles are now held by the Dukes of Hamilton. Under this system, baronial courts dealt with local issues and administered justice.

In 1877, the burgh became a police burgh, with local administration carried out by Commissioners of Police. These were replaced by Abernethy Town Council in 1901 with its status evolving into a small burgh. In 1947, Alan Gomme-Duncan, Perth's Member of Parliament noted in the House of Commons that: "Abernethy is probably one of the best examples in Scotland of an extremely efficiently run burgh of 700 inhabitants, with a live, wide-awake spirit, which produces an excellently run place to the obvious advantage of all who live there, and an example to many larger burghs nothing like so well run".

The town council, headed by a provost, continued to provide local government until its abolition in 1975 under wide-ranging local government reforms. Its powers were taken on by the Tayside Regional Council and Perth and Kinross District Council. In 1996, a unitary authority, Perth and Kinross Council was created.

== Transport ==
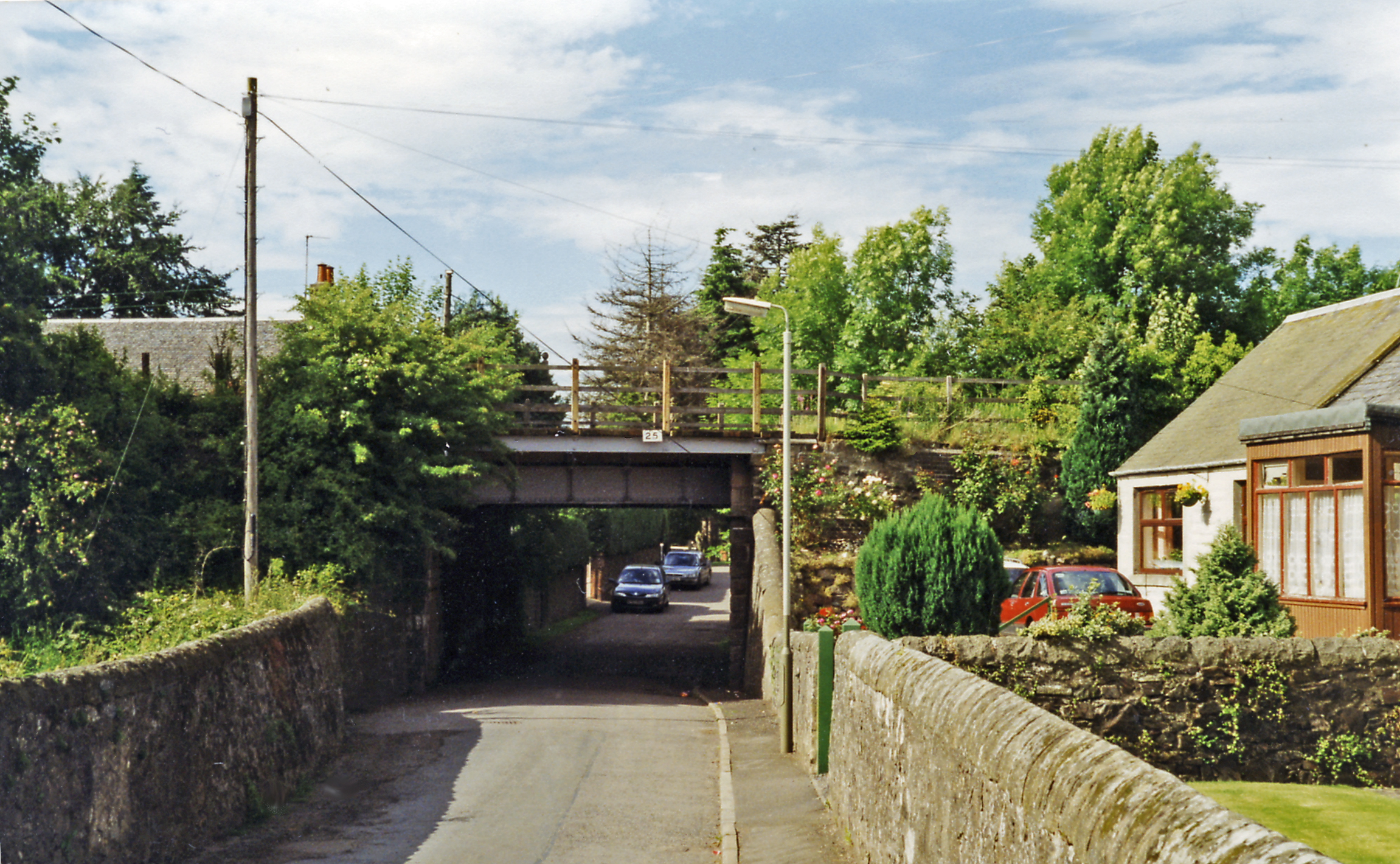
Location of Abernethy's former railway station.

The village is located near the M90 motorway, sitting on the A913 road, connecting to Cupar to the east and onward through the A912 to Perth in the west. There is a bus service to nearby towns.

Abernethy railway station served the village until 1955, when it was closed by the British Transport Commission. The line continues to operate as a branch of the Edinburgh–Dundee line, running between Perth and Ladybank. A campaign exists to re-open the neighbouring village of Newburgh's railway station.

== Education ==
The village maintains a single non-denominational state primary school. Abernethy Primary School's current building was constructed in 2002 and expanded in 2013. In 2023, the school roll was 148 pupils.
