= Kilmany railway station =

Disused railway station in Kilmany, Fife

Kilmany

General information
- Location: Kilmany, Fife; Scotland
- Coordinates: 56.384°N 2.9994°W
- Grid reference: NO383217
- Platforms: 2

Other information
- Status: Disused

History
- Original company: Newburgh and North Fife Railway
- Pre-grouping: Newburgh and North Fife Railway
- Post-grouping: LNER; British Railways (Scottish Region)

Key dates
- 25 January 1909: Opened
- 12 February 1951: Closed
Location

Kilmany railway station served the village of Kilmany, Fife, Scotland from 1909 to 1951 on the Newburgh and North Fife Railway.

== History ==
The station opened on 25 January 1909 by the Newburgh and North Fife Railway.

The goods yard was to the north. The signal box closed in 1928 and was replaced with a ground frame which allowed access to the goods yard. The station was host to a LNER camping coach from 1935 to 1939. At least part of the station buildings were used to provide camping apartment accommodation for holidaymakers from sometime in the 1950s until the early 1960s, there was accommodation for six people.

The line and station closed to passengers on 12 February 1951. The line closed to goods traffic on 5 October 1964.

Preceding station	Disused railways	Following station
Luthrie; Line and station closed	Newburgh and North Fife Railway	St Fort; Line and station closed
