= St Fort =

Coordinates: 56.413°N 2.958°W

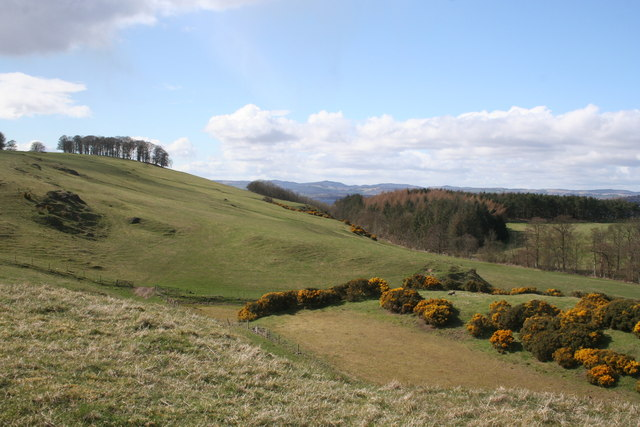
- St Fort Hill

- Location within Fife
- OS grid reference: NO4125
- Civil parish: Forgan
- Council area: Fife
- Lieutenancy area: Fife
- Country: Scotland
- Sovereign state: United Kingdom
- Post town: NEWPORT-ON-TAY
- Postcode district: DD6
- Dialling code: 01382
- Police: Scotland
- Fire: Scottish
- Ambulance: Scottish
- UK Parliament: North East Fife
- Scottish Parliament: North East Fife

St Fort (/sənˈfoʊrt/, /seɪntfoʊrt/, /ˈsɑːnfərd/ or /ˈsɑːnfər/) is a rural area, largely in Forgan parish, Fife. The current form of the name is late eighteenth century, the origin being a sandy ford on the Motray Water, in all likelihood the ford earlier known as Adnectan or Nechtan's ford. St Fort Hill lies immediately to the south of Newport-on-Tay and William Burn’s St Fort House, a large baronial mansion, demolished in 1953, lay on its southern slopes. The Home Farm, to its west, survives.

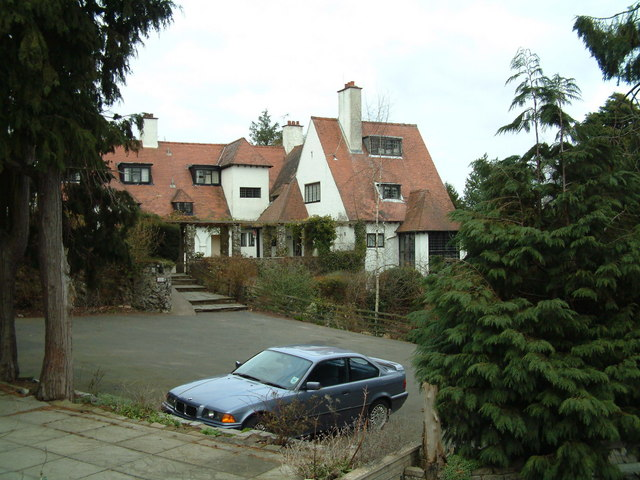
Sandford House Hotel

Further south, the area was formerly served by St Fort railway station, on the Edinburgh–Aberdeen line. The triangular adjunct of the St Fort junctions, connecting the now-defunct Newburgh and North Fife Railway, lay to the station's south-east.

Baillie Scott’s Arts and Crafts style Sandford House Hotel, taking the earlier form of the area's name, lies immediately to the station's west, just into Kilmany parish. Its restoration as a residence and holiday cottages was documented in the BBC television series Restoration Home.

The area is one of the origins of the surname Sandford. It is not to be confused with St Ford, 15 miles to the southeast in the parish of Kilconquhar, similarly sharing its origin as Sandford.
