= British Rail Class 06 =

Diesel shunter locomotive

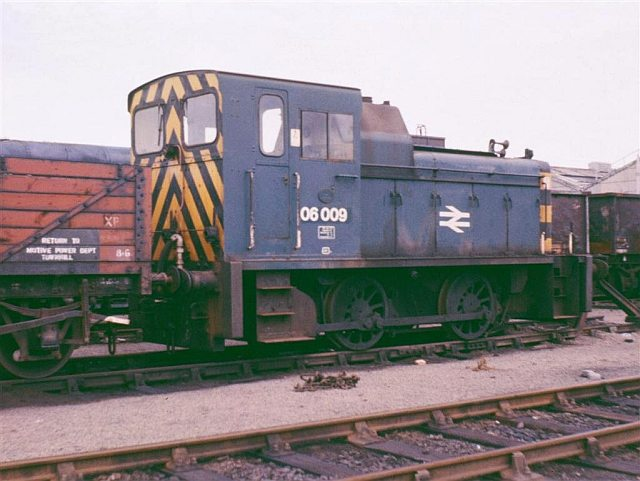
- 06009 operating as 'works pilot' at Dunfermline Townhill in 1975. It was withdrawn the following month.
Type and origin
- Power type: Diesel-mechanical
- Builder: Andrew Barclay Sons & Co.
- Serial number: 425–439, 452–471
- Build date: 1958–1960
- Total produced: 35
Specifications
- Configuration
  - Whyte: 0-4-0
  - UIC: B
- Gauge: 4 ft 8 1/2 in (1,435 mm)
- Wheel diameter: 3 ft 7 in (1.092 m)
- Wheelbase: 7 ft 0 in (2.134 m)
- Length: 25 ft 11 in (7.90 m)
- Width: 8 ft 5 in (2.565 m)
- Height: 11 ft 10 3/16 in (3.612 m)
- Loco weight: 37.30 long tons (37.9 t; 41.8 short tons)
- Fuel capacity: 325 imp gal (1,480 L; 390 US gal)
- Prime mover: Gardner 8L3
- Transmission: Wilson-Drewry CA5 5-speed epicyclic gearbox, Vulcan-Sinclair type 23 fluid coupling, Wiseman type 15 RLGB reversing gearbox and final drive
- Train brakes: Vacuum
Performance figures
- Maximum speed: 22.8 mph (36.7 km/h)
- Power output: Engine: 204 hp (152 kW)
- Tractive effort: Maximum: 19,800 lbf (88.1 kN)
- Brakeforce: 15 long tons-force (149 kN)
Career
- Operators: British Railways
- Numbers: D2410–D2444, later 06001–06010
- Axle load class: RA 6 (RA 5 from 1969)
- Retired: 1967–1981
- Disposition: One preserved, remainder scrapped

The British Rail Class 06 is a class of 0-4-0 diesel-mechanical shunters built by Andrew Barclay Sons and Company from 1958 to 1960 for use on the Scottish Region of British Railways. They were originally numbered D2410–D2444 and survivors after 1973 were given the TOPS numbers 06001–06010.

== Technical details ==
The engine is a Gardner 8-cylinder 4 stroke "8L3" connected to a Wilson-Drewry CA5 5-speed epicyclic gearbox with a Vulcan-Sinclair type 23 fluid coupling and a Wiseman type 15 RLGB gearbox.

While all technically similar, the locomotives had two different designs for the back of the cab, the first 15 locomotives having three windows, the remaining 20, having two.

== Numbering ==
They were originally numbered D2410–D2444. The ten still in service in January 1973, nos. D2413/14/20–23/26/37/40/44, were given the TOPS numbers 06001–06010.

D-number	TOPS Number	Allocation in February 1977	Image	Status	Notes
D2410		Withdrawn		Scrapped	
D2411		Withdrawn		Scrapped	
D2412		Withdrawn		Scrapped	
D2413	06001	Withdrawn		Scrapped	
D2414	06002	DT		Scrapped	
D2415		Withdrawn		Scrapped	
D2416		Withdrawn		Scrapped	
D2417		Withdrawn		Scrapped	
D2418		Withdrawn		Scrapped	
D2419		Withdrawn		Scrapped	
D2420	06003	ED		Preserved	For a considerable time, at Eastfield depot, carried the number 206003
D2421	06004	DE		Scrapped	
D2422	06005	DE		Scrapped	
D2423	06006	AB		Scrapped	
D2424		Withdrawn		Scrapped	
D2425		Withdrawn		Scrapped	
D2426	06007	DT		Scrapped	
D2427		Withdrawn		Scrapped	
D2428		Withdrawn		Scrapped	
D2429		Withdrawn		Scrapped	
D2430		Withdrawn		Scrapped	
D2431		Withdrawn		Scrapped	
D2432		Withdrawn		Unknown	Exported to Italy in 1977, fate unknown.
D2433		Withdrawn		Scrapped	
D2434		Withdrawn		Scrapped	
D2435		Withdrawn		Scrapped	
D2436		Withdrawn		Scrapped	
D2437	06008	DT		Scrapped	
D2438		Withdrawn		Scrapped	
D2439		Withdrawn		Scrapped	
D2440	06009	Withdrawn		Scrapped	
D2441		Withdrawn		Scrapped	
D2442		Withdrawn		Scrapped	
D2443		Withdrawn		Scrapped	
D2444	06010	Withdrawn		Scrapped	

== Withdrawal ==
With a decline in shunting, BR was forced to reduce its shunter fleet in the 1960s and 70s, resulting in mass withdrawals. The first class 06 locomotive to be withdrawn was D2441 in March 1967 and the last was 06002 (formerly D2414) in September 1981.

Year	Quantity in service at start of year	Quantity withdrawn	Locomotive numbers	Notes
1967	35	1	D2441	
1968	34	9	D2411–12/15/17–18/25/28/30/32	D2432 sold into industrial use
1969	25	5	2410/19/27/29/34	
1970	20	0	–	
1971	20	4	2431/35–36/39	
1972	16	6	2416/24/33/38/42–43	
1973–4	10	0	–	
1975	10	2	06009/010	
1976	8	1	06001	
1977	7	1	06007	
1978	6	0	–	
1979	6	1	06004	
1980	5	3	06005–006/008	
1981	2	2	06002/003	06003 went into departmental use, now preserved.

== Preservation ==
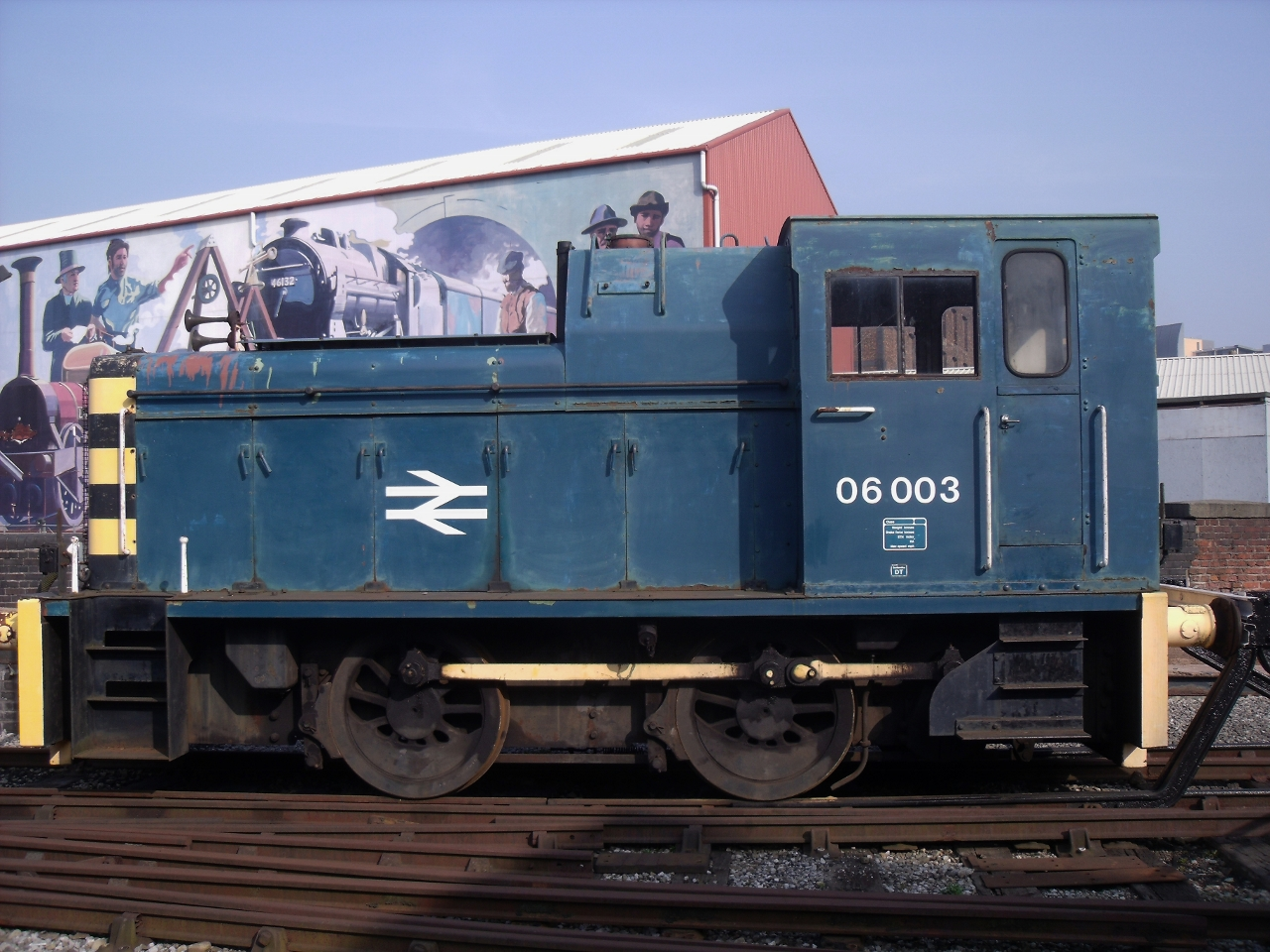
06003 at Museum of Science and Industry in Manchester, 2012

A single locomotive survives, number 06003 (formerly D2420). It was the second last locomotive of the class in service when it was withdrawn in February 1981. It was transferred to the departmental fleet following withdrawal and renumbered 97804, and used at the Reading Signal Works where it replaced 97020. After being withdrawn again in 1984, it was sold to Booth's scrapyard in Rotherham (date unknown) before being saved for preservation by the local South Yorkshire Railway based at Meadowhall in Sheffield. Later owned by HNRC and visited several locations before being stored at the Museum of Science and Industry, Liverpool Road, Manchester, and in 2013 was moved into the Heritage Shunters Trust collection at Peak Rail, Rowsley.

One locomotive, D2432, was sold to P. Wood Shipbreakers of Queenborough, Kent in 1969. It was exported to Italy in 1977, but its subsequent fate is unrecorded.

=== Model Railways ===
In 1963 Hornby Railways launched its first version of the BR Class 06 in OO gauge. Since 2011 Hornby have produced a basic representation of the prototype as part of their Railroad range in BR Blue, whilst past examples have carried a variety of liveries.

An etched brass kit of the 06 is in the range of Judith Edge Kits.
