= Collessie railway station =

Disused railway station in Collessie, Fife

Collessie

General information
- Location: Collessie, Fife; Scotland
- Coordinates: 56.3058°N 3.1568°W
- Grid reference: NO284132
- Platforms: 2

Other information
- Status: Disused

History
- Original company: Edinburgh and Northern Railway
- Pre-grouping: Edinburgh and Northern Railway; North British Railway
- Post-grouping: LNER

Key dates
- 17 September 1847: Opened
- 19 September 1955: Closed
Location

Collessie railway station served the village of Collessie, Fife, Scotland from 1847 to 1955 on the Edinburgh and Northern Railway.

== History ==
The station opened on 20 September 1847 by the Edinburgh and Northern Railway. The station closed to both passengers and goods traffic on 19 September 1955.

Preceding station	Historical railways	Following station
Glenburnie; Line open, station closed	Edinburgh and Northern Railway	Ladybank; Line and station open
