= List of listed buildings in Abernethy, Perth and Kinross =

This is a list of listed buildings in the parish of Abernethy in Perth and Kinross, Scotland.

== List ==
Name	Location	Date listed	Grid ref. (Note: Sometimes known as OSGB36, the grid reference (where provided) is based on the British national grid reference system used by the Ordnance Survey. • "Guide to National Grid". Ordnance Survey. • "Get-a-map". Ordnance Survey.)	Geo-coordinates	Notes	LB number (Note: Historic Environment Scotland assign a unique alphanumeric identifier to each designated site in Scotland, for listed buildings this always begins with "LB", for example "LB12345".)	Image
Main Street, Cross, War Memorial				56°19′58″N 3°18′42″W	Category B	20878	Upload Photo
51 Main Street, Pitblae House				56°19′58″N 3°18′43″W	Category C(S)	20879	Upload Photo
53 Main Street, Old Town House				56°19′58″N 3°18′42″W	Category C(S)	20880	Upload Photo
24 Main Street, The Inn				56°19′56″N 3°18′44″W	Category C(S)	20900	Upload Photo
5 Main Street, White House				56°19′57″N 3°18′53″W	Category C(S)	20907	Upload Photo
Kirk Wynd, Woodriffe Cottage				56°19′57″N 3°18′38″W	Category C(S)	20912	Upload Photo
Carey, Farmhouse				56°20′11″N 3°20′19″W	Category B	5483	Upload Photo
Kirk Wynd, Cortes				56°19′57″N 3°18′40″W	Category C(S)	20916	Upload Photo
School Wynd, Abernethy Parish Church				56°20′00″N 3°18′43″W	Category C(S)	20876	Upload Photo
72 Main Street, Kinclaven House				56°20′00″N 3°18′36″W	Category C(S)	20883	Upload Photo
59 Main Street				56°19′58″N 3°18′41″W	Category C(S)	20884	Upload Photo
64 Main Street				56°19′59″N 3°18′37″W	Category C(S)	20889	Upload Photo
56 And 58 Main Street, The Hillock				56°19′58″N 3°18′38″W	Category B	20891	Upload Photo
54 Main Street				56°19′58″N 3°18′38″W	Category B	20892	Upload Photo
52 Main Street				56°19′58″N 3°18′39″W	Category C(S)	20893	Upload Photo
44 And 44B Main Street, Abernethy Clinic				56°19′57″N 3°18′41″W	Category C(S)	20896	Upload Photo
Kirk Wynd, Hill Cottage				56°19′56″N 3°18′37″W	Category C(S)	20915	Upload Photo
Kirk Wynd, Former South United Free Church (The Williamson Kirk)				56°19′55″N 3°18′39″W	Category B	20919	Upload Photo
Glentarkie Farmhouse				56°17′36″N 3°18′30″W	Category C(S)	5459	Upload Photo
Pittuncarty Farmhouse				56°17′19″N 3°18′33″W	Category B	5461	Upload Photo
Binn Farm				56°18′19″N 3°20′25″W	Category C(S)	5464	Upload Photo
Balvaird Castle				56°17′20″N 3°20′34″W	Category A	5466	Upload Photo
Ayton House				56°19′25″N 3°20′52″W	Category B	5485	Upload Photo
School Wynd, Culdees Tea Room				56°19′58″N 3°18′43″W	Category C(S)	20881	Upload Photo
School Wynd, Mornington Cottage And Museum Of Abernethy				56°20′02″N 3°18′44″W	Category C(S)	20882	Upload Photo
63 Main Street				56°19′58″N 3°18′40″W	Category C(S)	20886	Upload Photo
46 And 48 Main Street				56°19′57″N 3°18′40″W	Category C(S)	20895	Upload Photo
9 & 9A Main Street				56°19′57″N 3°18′51″W	Category C(S)	20906	Upload Photo
Main Street, Cree's Inn With Outbuilding And Boundary Walls				56°20′00″N 3°18′38″W	Category B	20920	Upload Photo
Balvaird Farmhouse				56°17′44″N 3°20′19″W	Category C(S)	5465	Upload Photo
School Wynd, Abernethy Round Tower With Symbol Stone At Base				56°19′59″N 3°18′42″W	Category A	20875	Upload another image
2 Main Street				56°19′56″N 3°18′54″W	Category C(S)	20910	Upload Photo
Old House Of Carpow				56°20′36″N 3°17′18″W	Category B	5458	Upload Photo
School Wynd, Abernethy Parish Church Graveyard				56°20′00″N 3°18′42″W	Category C(S)	20877	Upload Photo
30 Main Street				56°19′57″N 3°18′43″W	Category C(S)	20897	Upload Photo
28 Main Street, Ingleneuk				56°19′57″N 3°18′43″W	Category C(S)	20898	Upload Photo
1 Main Street, Balloburn				56°19′57″N 3°18′56″W	Category B	20909	Upload Photo
6 Main Street, The Cottage And 8 Main Street, Westbank				56°19′56″N 3°18′52″W	Category C(S)	20911	Upload Photo
Kirk Wynd, Willesdene				56°19′57″N 3°18′38″W	Category B	20913	Upload Photo
Kirk Wynd, Pitcaithly Cottage				56°19′57″N 3°18′38″W	Category B	20914	Upload Photo
Ayton House, Cottage And Steading Of Offices				56°19′22″N 3°20′55″W	Category B	5453	Upload Photo
Carpow, Gatepiers At Lodge				56°20′30″N 3°17′07″W	Category C(S)	5457	Upload Photo
61 Main Street, Tower Bakery				56°19′58″N 3°18′40″W	Category C(S)	20885	Upload Photo
60 Main Street				56°19′58″N 3°18′38″W	Category B	20890	Upload Photo
26 Main Street, Post Office				56°19′57″N 3°18′43″W	Category C(S)	20899	Upload Photo
22A And 22B Main Street				56°19′56″N 3°18′45″W	Category C(S)	20901	Upload Photo
Ayton House North East Lodge				56°19′40″N 3°20′33″W	Category C(S)	5454	Upload Photo
Ayton House South West Lodge				56°19′23″N 3°21′13″W	Category C(S)	5455	Upload Photo
Ayton House Bridge And Gatepiers At South West Lodge				56°19′23″N 3°21′14″W	Category B	5456	Upload Photo
Main Street, 1 Barmore Place				56°19′57″N 3°18′49″W	Category C(S)	20902	Upload Photo
3 Main Street, Corner Shop				56°19′57″N 3°18′55″W	Category B	20908	Upload Photo
Back Dykes, The Hollies				56°20′01″N 3°18′51″W	Category C(S)	20917	Upload Photo
Catochill Steading				56°18′20″N 3°19′52″W	Category C(S)	5463	Upload Photo
65 Main Street				56°19′58″N 3°18′39″W	Category C(S)	20887	Upload Photo
66 Main Street				56°19′59″N 3°18′36″W	Category C(S)	20888	Upload Photo
50 Main Street				56°19′57″N 3°18′39″W	Category C(S)	20894	Upload Photo
31 And 33 Main Street				56°19′57″N 3°18′46″W	Category C(S)	20904	Upload Photo
11 And 13 Main Street				56°19′57″N 3°18′51″W	Category C(S)	20905	Upload Photo
Glentarkie, Old Walled Garden				56°17′34″N 3°18′26″W	Category B	5460	Upload Photo
Catochill Farmhouse				56°18′19″N 3°19′50″W	Category B	5462	Upload Photo
Gattaway, Farmhouse				56°19′52″N 3°18′19″W	Category B	5482	Upload Photo
Elliothead, Farmhouse				56°20′58″N 3°22′09″W	Category C(S)	5484	Upload Photo
Upper Greenside, Ancillary Building				56°20′16″N 3°16′54″W	Category C(S)	47353	Upload Photo

== Key ==
The scheme for classifying buildings in Scotland is:

- Category A: "buildings of national or international importance, either architectural or historic; or fine, little-altered examples of some particular period, style or building type."
- Category B: "buildings of regional or more than local importance; or major examples of some particular period, style or building type, which may have been altered."
- Category C: "buildings of local importance; lesser examples of any period, style, or building type, as originally constructed or moderately altered; and simple traditional buildings which group well with other listed buildings."

In March 2016 there were 47,288 listed buildings in Scotland. Of these, 8% were Category A, and 50% were Category B, with the remaining 42% being Category C.
