= Abernethy railway station =

Disused railway station in Abernethy, Scotland

Abernethy
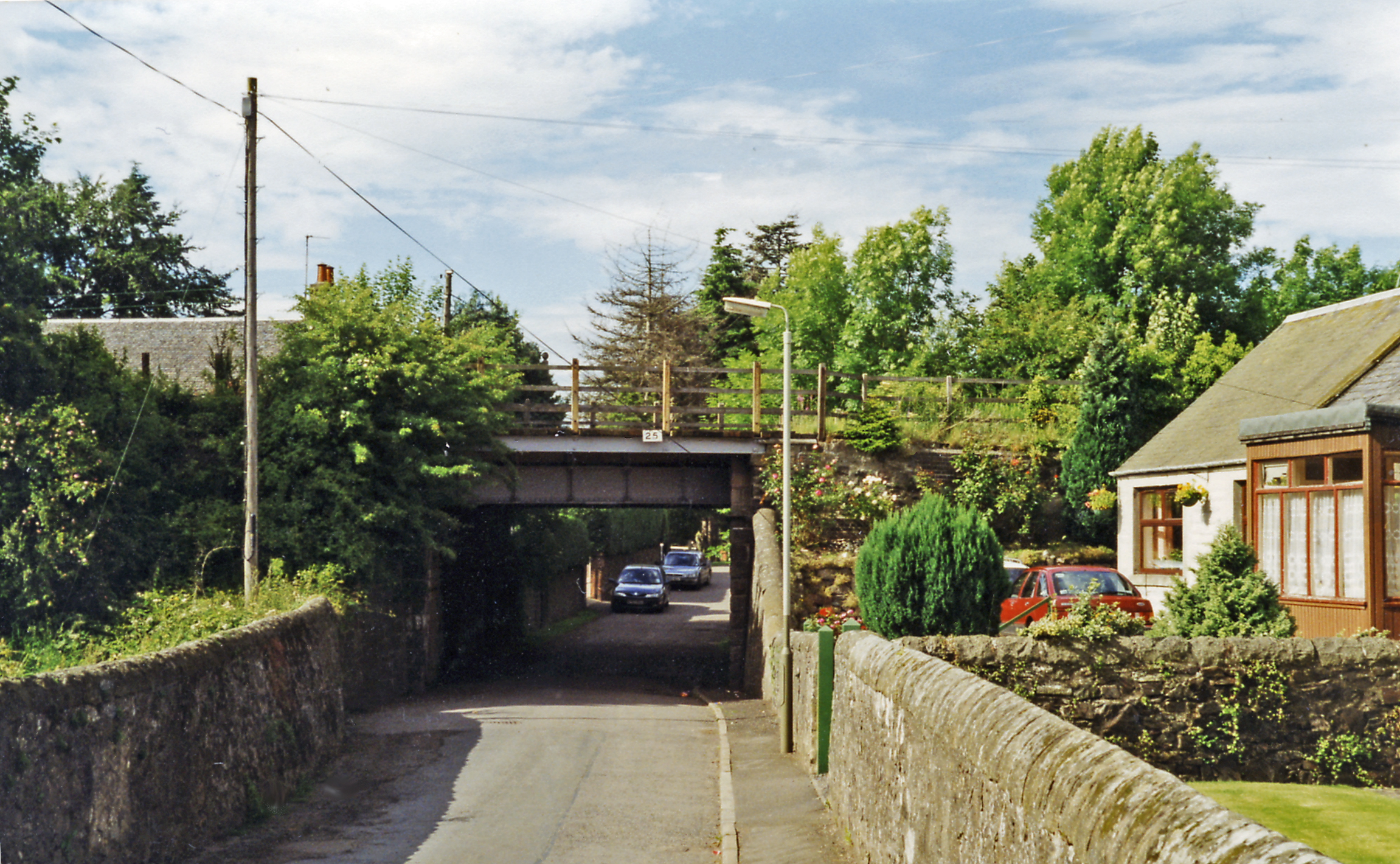
- Location of the former station (1997)

General information
- Location: Abernethy, Perth and Kinross; Scotland
- Coordinates: 56.33559°N 3.31263°W
- Grid reference: NO188166
- Platforms: ?

Other information
- Status: Disused

History
- Original company: Edinburgh and Northern Railway
- Pre-grouping: North British Railway
- Post-grouping: London and North Eastern Railway

Key dates
- 18 May 1848: Abernethy Road opened
- 18 July 1848: Abernethy opened
- 25 July 1848: Abernethy Road closed
- 19 September 1955: Abernethy closed
Location

Abernethy railway station served the village of Abernethy, in Scotland.

== History ==
Initially Abernethy Road opened concurrently with the Edinburgh and Northern Railway on 18 May 1848. When the line was extended this first station was replaced by Abernethy on 18 July 1848.

It became part of the North British Railway in 1865, and so into the London and North Eastern Railway. The line then passed on to the Scottish Region of British Railways on nationalisation in 1948. The station was closed by the British Transport Commission on 19 September 1955.

Preceding station	Historical railways	Following station
Newburgh; Line open, station closed	Edinburgh and Northern Railway; North British Railway	Bridge of Earn; Line open, station closed

== The site today ==
Although the line through the station site is still open for trains, as part of the Edinburgh to Inverness Line between Perth and Ladybank, the station at Abernethy is closed. A small section of the southbound platform is still in place, but is heavily overgrown.
