= Dunfermline Townhill TMD =

Disused traction maintenance depot in Dunfermline, Fife

- Interactive map of Dunfermline Townhill TMD

Location
- Location: Dunfermline, Fife
- Coordinates: 56.0749°N 3.4461°W
- OS grid: NT100878

Characteristics
- Owner: British Rail
- Depot code: DT (1973 -)
- Type: Diesel

History
- Former depot code: 62C (1 July 1970 - 5 May 1973)

Dunfermline Townhill TMD was a traction maintenance depot located in Dunfermline, Fife, Scotland. The depot was situated on the Fife Circle Line and was near Dunfermline station.

The depot code was DT.

== History ==
Prior to May 1973 the shed code was 62C. After that it was DT. In 1976, Class 06 and 08 shunters could be seen at the depot.
