= Tay Bridge (disambiguation) =

The Tay Bridge is a railway bridge across the Firth of Tay at Dundee, Scotland:

Tay Bridge may also refer to:

- Tay Road Bridge, across the Firth of Tay at Dundee, Scotland
- Tay Bridge, another name for Wade's Bridge in Aberfeldy, Scotland
- "Operation Tay Bridge" was also the codename for the funeral plans for Queen Elizabeth the Queen Mother

== See also ==
- Tay Bridge disaster
- The Tay Bridge Disaster, a poem written by Scottish poet William McGonagall
- Category:Bridges across the River Tay and List of crossings of the River Tay, for other bridges across the River Tay
- Jubilee Bridge, Tay, aka Tay Crossing
