= Forgan (Fife) =

Civil parish in Fife, Scotland

Coordinates: 56.4236°N 2.9321°W

Forgan is a civil parish in the Scottish county of Fife. It extends 4 miles in length along the north coast of Fife and is at the southern mouth of the River Tay. It is bounded by the other Fife civil parishes of Ferry-Port on Craig, Leuchars and Balmerino. It contains the towns of Newport-on-Tay and Wormit. The roads and railways leading to the Tay Bridges pass through the parish.

The name of the parish is from the Scottish Gaelic For Gronn meaning "above or beside the bog" or perhaps "big bog".

== See also ==
- St Fort railway station
