= List of listed buildings in Creich, Fife =

This is a list of listed buildings in the parish of Creich in Fife, Scotland.

== List ==
| Name | Location | Date listed | Grid ref. (Note: Sometimes known as OSGB36, the grid reference (where provided) is based on the British national grid reference system used by the Ordnance Survey. • "Guide to National Grid". Ordnance Survey. • "Get-a-map". Ordnance Survey.) | Geo-coordinates | Notes | LB number (Note: Historic Environment Scotland assign a unique alphanumeric identifier to each designated site in Scotland, for listed buildings this always begins with "LB", for example "LB12345".) | Image |
|---|---|---|---|---|---|---|---|
| The Beeches | | | | 56°22′32″N 3°05′56″W | Category C(S) | 2179 | Upload Photo |
| Creich Castle, Tower | | | | 56°22′44″N 3°05′21″W | Category B | 2141 | Upload another image |
| Annfield, Village Shop Row | | | | 56°22′30″N 3°05′58″W | Category C(S) | 2176 | Upload Photo |
| "Druid Circle" Manse Of Creich | | | | 56°22′36″N 3°06′14″W | Category B | 2139 | Upload Photo |
| Old Smiddy House Luthrie | | | | 56°21′50″N 3°05′03″W | Category C(S) | 2144 | Upload Photo |
| Carphin House | | | | 56°21′47″N 3°06′09″W | Category C(S) | 2151 | Upload Photo |
| Carphin Doocot | | | | 56°21′52″N 3°06′06″W | Category B | 2152 | Upload Photo |
| Burnside, Formerly Hayslop | | | | 56°22′31″N 3°05′52″W | Category C(S) | 2155 | Upload Photo |
| Cherrybank | | | | 56°22′36″N 3°05′48″W | Category C(S) | 2158 | Upload Photo |
| Brunton Village, Village Shop Property | | | | 56°22′30″N 3°05′58″W | Category C(S) | 4281 | Upload Photo |
| Manse Of Creich | | | | 56°22′34″N 3°06′12″W | Category B | 2138 | Upload Photo |
| Parbroath House | | | | 56°20′49″N 3°05′43″W | Category B | 2146 | Upload Photo |
| Brunton Village, Old Weaving Shed Opposite Village Shop | | | | 56°22′30″N 3°05′58″W | Category C(S) | 4282 | Upload Photo |
| Carphin House, Lodge And Gates | | | | 56°21′41″N 3°05′39″W | Category C(S) | 2150 | Upload Photo |
| Creich Castle Doocot | | | | 56°22′45″N 3°05′23″W | Category A | 2173 | Upload Photo |
| Weavers' Sheds Property Of Metcalfe, The Beeches | | | | 56°22′33″N 3°05′56″W | Category C(S) | 2180 | Upload Photo |
| Creich Parish Kirk Stables And Gighouse | | | | 56°22′01″N 3°05′23″W | Category C(S) | 2143 | Upload Photo |
| Parbroath Castle | | | | 56°20′46″N 3°05′57″W | Category C(S) | 2147 | Upload Photo |
| Parbroath Castle Doocot | | | | 56°20′51″N 3°05′59″W | Category B | 2148 | Upload Photo |
| Lilac Cottage | | | | 56°22′31″N 3°05′51″W | Category C(S) | 2156 | Upload Photo |
| The Croft (Revalski) | | | | 56°22′33″N 3°05′52″W | Category C(S) | 2157 | Upload Photo |
| School Row Comprising Former Free School Now Mchaven And Mr Young's Cottages | | | | 56°22′30″N 3°05′55″W | Category C(S) | 2174 | Upload Photo |
| Dendale Farm House | | | | 56°22′30″N 3°05′56″W | Category C(S) | 2175 | Upload Photo |
| Reid, Village Shop Row | | | | 56°22′30″N 3°05′57″W | Category C(S) | 2177 | Upload Photo |
| Detached Out-Building, Village Shop Row (Mr Reid's) | | | | 56°22′30″N 3°05′56″W | Category C(S) | 2178 | Upload Photo |
| Balmeadowside Farm House | | | | 56°21′04″N 3°06′23″W | Category C(S) | 2149 | Upload Photo |
| Old Parish Kirk Of St Devenic And Churchyard, Creich (Excluding Modern Cemetery Extension) | | | | 56°22′48″N 3°05′30″W | Category B | 2153 | Upload Photo |
| Anzac, Brunton | | | | 56°22′31″N 3°05′53″W | Category C(S) | 2154 | Upload Photo |
| Creich Farm Steading (Mountquhanie Farms) | | | | 56°22′44″N 3°05′24″W | Category B | 43883 | Upload Photo |
| Creich Parish Kirk Including Churchyard, Walls And Gates | | | | 56°22′02″N 3°05′22″W | Category B | 2142 | Upload another image |
| Lower Luthrie House (Luthrie House On Map) | | | | 56°21′44″N 3°04′58″W | Category C(S) | 2145 | Upload Photo |

== Key ==
The scheme for classifying buildings in Scotland is:

- Category A: "buildings of national or international importance, either architectural or historic; or fine, little-altered examples of some particular period, style or building type."
- Category B: "buildings of regional or more than local importance; or major examples of some particular period, style or building type, which may have been altered."
- Category C: "buildings of local importance; lesser examples of any period, style, or building type, as originally constructed or moderately altered; and simple traditional buildings which group well with other listed buildings."

In March 2016 there were 47,288 listed buildings in Scotland. Of these, 8% were Category A, and 50% were Category B, with the remaining 42% being Category C.

== See also ==
- List of listed buildings in Fife
