= Dundee Esplanade railway station =

Disused railway station in Dundee, Scotland

Dundee Esplanade
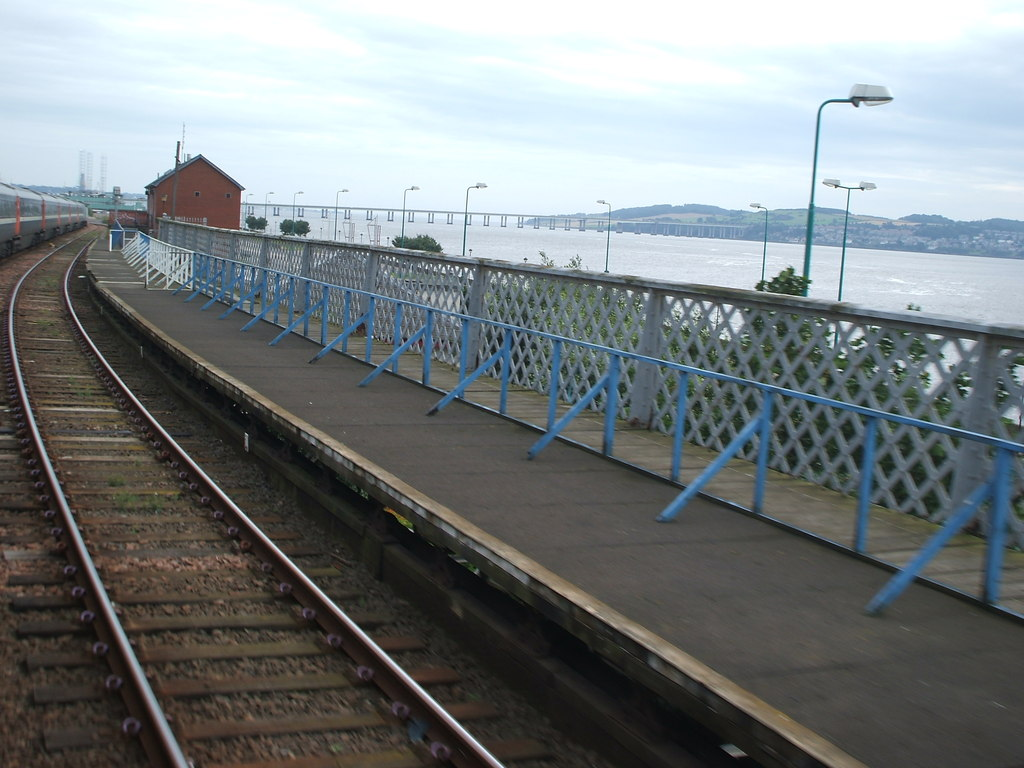
- The site of the station, looking north towards Dundee, in 1997

General information
- Location: Dundee; Scotland
- Coordinates: 56.4519°N 2.988°W
- Grid reference: NO392293
- Platforms: 2

Other information
- Status: Disused

History
- Original company: North British Railway
- Post-grouping: LNER

Key dates
- 1 May 1889: Opened
- 1 January 1917: Closed
- 1 February 1919: Reopened
- 2 October 1939: Closed
Location
- Location within Dundee City council area

Dundee Esplanade railway station served the city of Dundee from 1889 to 1939 on the Tay Bridge Railway.

== History ==
The station opened on 1 May 1889 by the North British Railway, opening after the second Tay Bridge was built. On the eastbound platform was a signal box that has 'Tay Bridge North' on it, replacing the old one. This signal box closed in 1928. To the east were a group of sidings on the north and south sides of the station. The south set of sidings were later removed and the northern set were reduced to just two sidings. The station closed on 1 January 1917 but reopened on 1 February 1919, only to close again on 2 October 1939.
