= Newburgh and North Fife Railway =

Railway in Scotland

Overview
- Locale: Scotland
- Dates of operation: 6 August 1897–31 December 1922
- Successor: London and North Eastern Railway

Technical
- Track gauge: 4 ft 8 1/2 in (1,435 mm)
- Length: 13 1/2 miles (21.7 km)

The Newburgh and North Fife Railway was a Scottish railway company formed to build a connecting line between St Fort and Newburgh, in Fife, intended to open up residential traffic between the intermediate communities and Dundee and Perth. It opened its line, which was expensive to construct, in 1909 but the local traffic never developed. It closed to passenger traffic in 1951, and completely in 1964.

== Background ==
The Newport Railway opened its short line in 1879, running from the Fife end of the newly opened Tay Rail Bridge. The short line immediately opened up residential travel from Newport-on-Tay to Dundee, providing a journey time of ten minutes by train, rather than the former unreliable ferry crossing. The fall of the Tay Bridge later that year, in the Tay Bridge Disaster, naturally caused a disruption to the development of the passenger business, but when the second Tay Bridge opened in 1887 the trade was quick to resume.

Dundee is hemmed in between the Firth of Tay and the hilly country to the north, and expansion to the south, in Fife, encouraged residential development.

== Incorporation of the Newburgh and North Fife Railway ==
Observing the commercial success of the Newport Railway, local promoters developed a scheme for another railway, this time running south-west from the Fife end of the Tay Bridge. This too was intended to develop housing and residential travel across the Tay, as well as linking up towards Perth at the Newburgh end, potentially tapping traffic at that end of the line.

There was an enthusiastic meeting of potential promoters in the Royal Hotel, Cupar on 3 November 1896.

== The Newburgh and North Fife Railway ==
Newburgh and North Fife Railway Act 1897
- Act of Parliament
- Parliament of the United Kingdom
- Long title: An Act for making a Railway in the County of Fife to be called the Newburgh and North Fife Railway and for other purposes.
- Citation: 60 & 61 Vict. c. ccxxi

Dates
- Royal assent: 6 August 1897

Text of statute as originally enacted

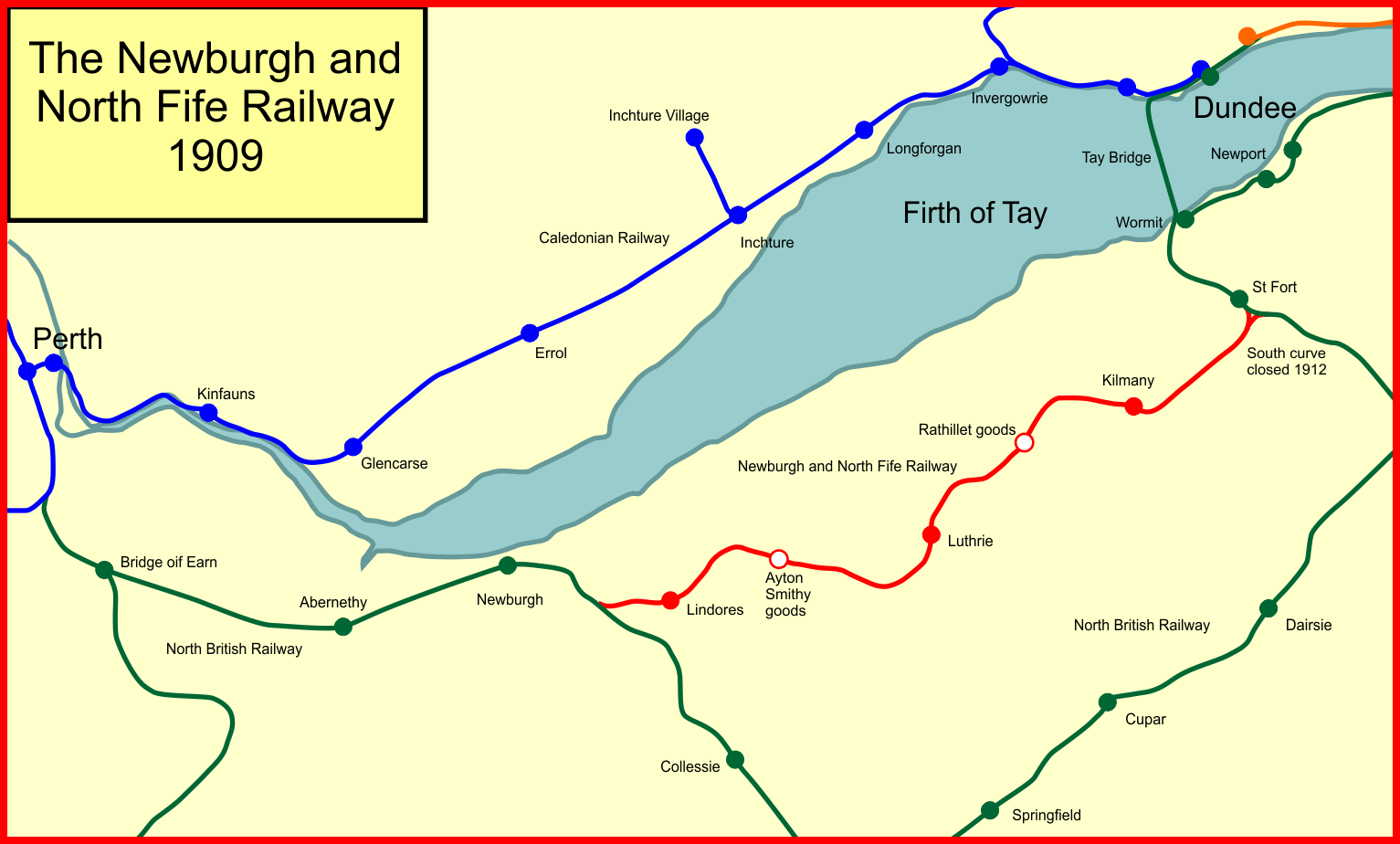
System map of the Newburgh and North Fife Railway

The Newburgh and North Fife Railway obtained its act of Parliament, the Newburgh and North Fife Railway Act 1897 (60 & 61 Vict. c. ccxxi), on 6 August 1897. It was to be just over thirteen miles in length, between Glenburnie Junction at Newburgh (between Ladybank and Perth) and a triangular junction at St Fort, between the Tay Bridge and Leuchars, enabling direct running to the bridge or towards St Andrews. The authorised capital was £120,000.

However the months rolled past and nothing was done, the subscription list not having been fulfilled, and the powers for construction had to be revived by the North British Railway in its general powers acts of Parliament in 1900, 1902, 1904 and 1906. At last on 11 June 1906 contracts had been let. Soon the first sod was cut, in June 1906

The line involved prodigious engineering works and took five years to construct. The line was inspected by Major Pringle of the Board of Trade on 12 January 1909.

== Opening ==
The line opened for "general" traffic (that is, goods) on 22 January 1909 and on 25 January 1909 the line opened fully.

The actual cost at completion seems to have exceeded the estimate by a considerable margin:

The Newburgh and North Fife Railway, which is to be opened on Monday [25 January 1909] for public service, is about 13¼ miles in length and was built at a cost of about £240,000. The new railway, besides being expected to aid in the development of an important agricultural district, gives the North British a through route between the districts to the north and west of Perth and Dundee and the Forfarshire coasts. There are three stations, at Kilmanie, Luthrie and Lindores, which have been designed with specially long platforms for the accommodation of the summer excursion traffic.

Owing to the nature of the country, no less than 22 steel and nine masonry [viaducts] have been erected, and nearly half a million cubic yards of material were excavated. The railway, which is a single line with loops to enable trains to pass one another, and with bridges wide enough to accommodate a double track, has been built so as to enable the heaviest modern rolling stock to be worked over it. In addition to the expected traffic in agricultural produce to the Perth and Dundee markets, a considerable residential traffic is anticipated, especially on the section of line near Dundee. The railway will be worked by the North British, which is entitled to 50% of the gross receipts, the larger company guaranteeing a 4% dividend, in addition to giving a valuable traffic guarantee.

The line was worked from the outset by the North British Railway. There were intermediate stations at Kilmany, Luthrie and Lindores; Kilmany and Luthrie had passing loops and the three stations had ample 450 feet long platforms. There were also intermediate goods sidings at Rathillet, just west of Kilmany, and at Ayton Smithy, between Lindores and Luthrie.

Coming late to the development of transport facilities, there were several important roads to be crossed on the skew, and there were a prodigious number of long-span bridges on the line; earthworks too were of a heavier character than usual.

== Dissension ==
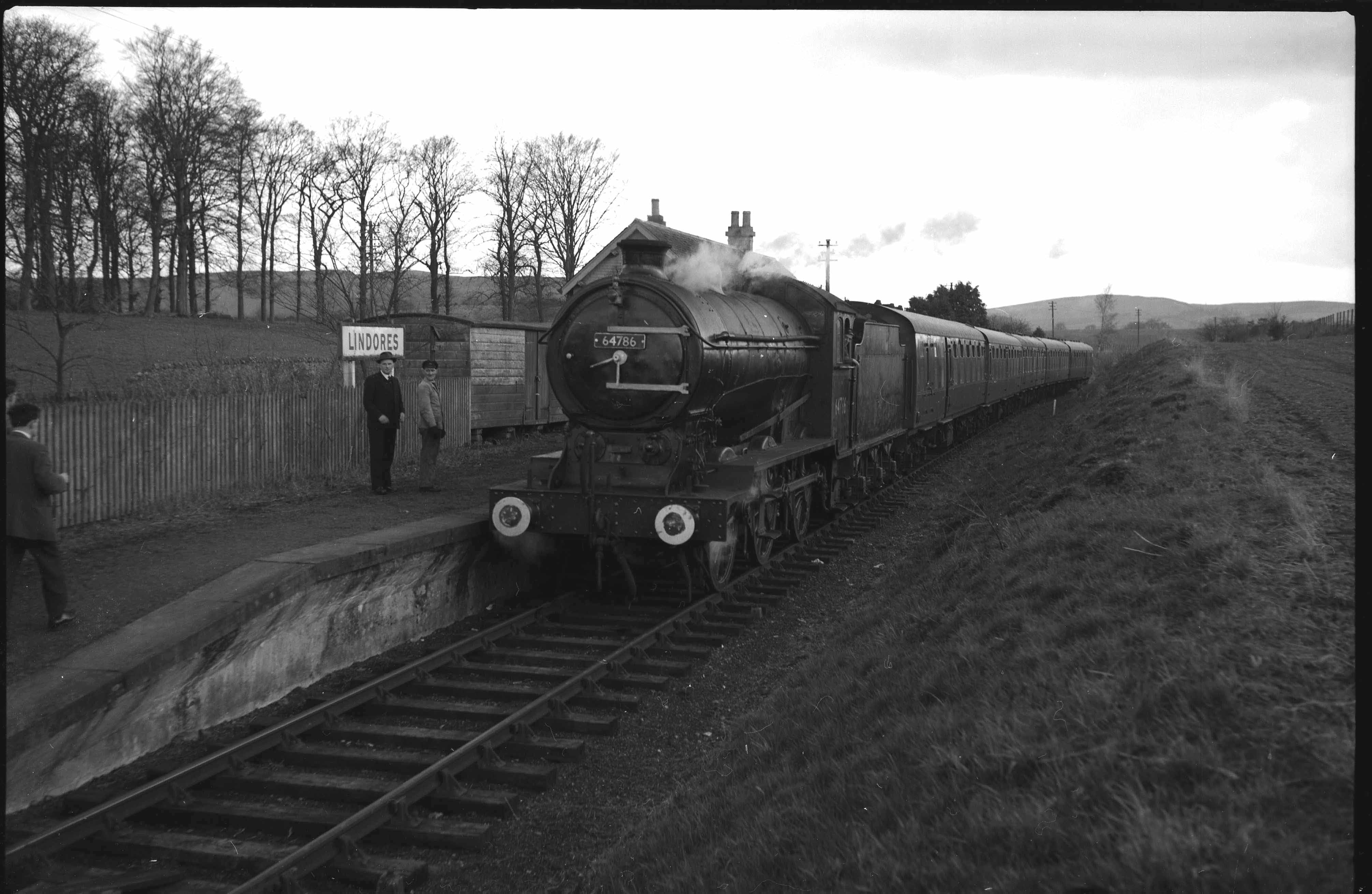
"The Scottish Rambler" Railtour at Lindores Station in 1962 hauled by a Gresley J39 No. 64786

The initial passenger train service evidently made poor connections at each end; "A disappointed Fifer" wrote to the local newspaper:

The earliest train in the morning does not arrive in Dundee until 9.34. Passengers by the succeeding train have only fifty minutes to wait at St Fort. These, however, are not to be compared with the accommodating arrangements westwards. By the first train in the morning going towards Perth there is a delay at Newburgh of sixteen minutes, by the second twenty-four minutes, and by the third and last one hour and nineteen minutes. Returning from Perth, the delays at Newburgh by the three trains are one hour thirty-nine minutes, one hour twenty-one minutes, and eleven minutes. To the second of these trains has to be added the fifty minutes' wait at St Fort.

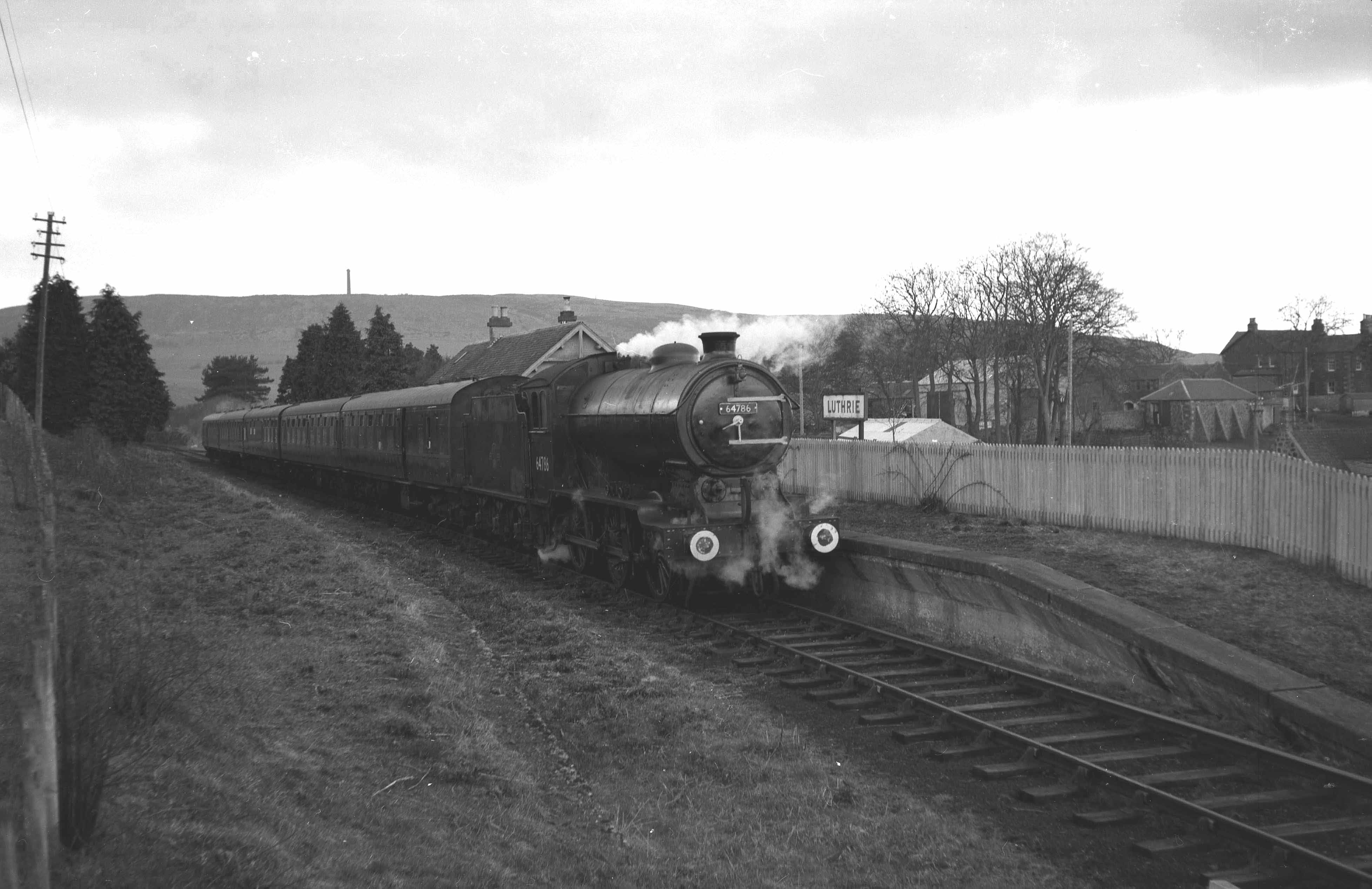
"The Scottish Rambler" Railtour at Luthrie Station in 1962 hauled by a Gresley J39 No. 64786

This proved not merely to be a traveller's complaint. The Directors of the Newburgh and North Fife Railway sued the North British Railway for inadequately generating income. In addition there was a dispute about the extent of the guarantee to make up the 4% dividend: the issue was the capital sum on which that 4% was to be based.

The NBR was accused by the owning company (the Newburgh and North Fife Railway) of failing to make enough effort to generate traffic for the line, and indeed of diverting traffic on to their own wholly owned parallel lines. At a tribunal the NBR presented figures showing that they were losing money heavily in working the line, which was being done for 50% of gross receipts. In a typical year the receipts for the line were £2,799 of which the NBR received £1,399; the cost to them of working the line was £4,122, incurring a loss of £2,723. Local traffic generated only £20 to £30 annually.

At summary hearing the North British lost the case brought by the Newburgh and North Fife company requiring NBR to make up the 4% dividend; the N&NFR alleged that the NBR had not made adequate efforts to promote the line. The court found against the NBR.

However, on appeal the capital on which the 4% was due was reduced from the claimed £240,000 to £137,965.

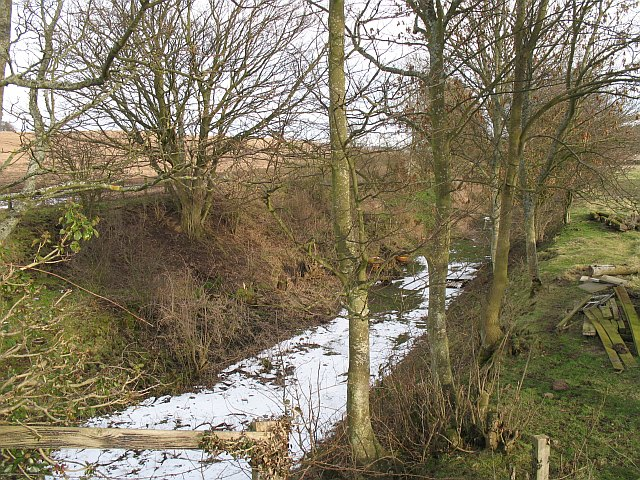
Track bed of the closed Newburgh and North Fife Railway.

The NBR attempted to make something of the line by running fast trains between Dundee and Perth in competition with the Caledonian Railway service. However the NBR trains had a significant mileage penalty, crossing the Tay Bridge before turning west, and finally being dependent on the rival company's line from Hilton Junction into Perth, and the trains were not outstandingly successful.

Moreover, the cut-throat competition of earlier decades was over; in those days the NBR would have used every stratagem to route goods traffic over the line it was working at the expense of its rival; but now fair play was the philosophy, and only goods wagons that achieved a shorter transit travelled over the line. There was little originating on the line itself. The promoters compared the towns they were going to serve with Newport-on-Tay; but Newport had an established traffic of daily commuters with Dundee by ferry, and was a commercially oriented town; the villages on the Newburgh line were relatively undeveloped agricultural settlements.

== Later events ==
The south curve at St Fort was closed after only three years.

During World War I there was a serious shortage of manpower and the line closed temporarily; the service resumed on 22 July 1916 traffic resumed after temporary closure due to staff shortage.

In 1922 there were four passenger trains daily over the line, running between Dundee and Perth. The journey time from Kilmany to Dundee was about twenty minutes.

== Grouping, and nationalisation ==
The Newburgh and North Fife Railway remained independent, although not operating the railway itself until the grouping of the railways of Great Britain following the Railways Act 1921, when the N&NFR and the North British Railway were transferred into the new London and North Eastern Railway. In 1948 the LNER was nationalised and became part of British Railways.

In 1933 an application by a bus operator to run a service paralleling the line was refused by the Road Traffic Commissioners, on the ground that the line's precarious finances meant that it would close if the bus service operated.

The last regular passenger train ran on 10 February 1951. However, for eight weeks in early 1955 the Tay viaduct at Perth was closed at night for repairs, and night goods trains were diverted over the line during the work.

The line was closed to all traffic from Glenburnie Junction to Lindores on 4 April 1960, and throughout on 5 October 1964.

== Heritage paths ==
A 3.5 kilometres (2.2 mi) stretch of the old line is featured in the Heritage Paths web site under Kilmany Railway Line.

== Route ==
Location	Opened	Closed	Notes
St Fort Junctions			
Kilmany	25 January 1909	25 February 1951	
Rathillet goods			
Luthrie	25 January 1909	25 February 1951	
Ayton Smithy goods			
Lindores	25 January 1909	25 February 1951	There had briefly been a Lindores terminus station on the original Edinburgh, Perth and Dundee Railway main line that closed in 1847.
Glenburnie Junction			
