= Great Coates Level Crossing electric railway station =

Former railway station in England

Great Coates Level Crossing

General information
- Location: Great Coates, North East Lincolnshire; England
- Coordinates: 53.5824°N 0.1192°W
- Grid reference: TA246111
- Platforms: 0

Other information
- Status: Disused

History
- Original company: Great Central Railway
- Pre-grouping: Great Central Railway
- Post-grouping: London and North Eastern Railway

Key dates
- 15 May 1912: opened as No. 3 Passing Place
- by June 1914: renamed Great Coates Level Crossing
- 3 July 1961: closed
Location

Great Coates Level Crossing electric railway station was situated at the third of eight passing loops on the otherwise single track central "country" section of the inter-urban Grimsby and Immingham Electric Railway when travelling from Corporation Bridge, Grimsby to Immingham Dock.

== Overview ==
The electric railway was built primarily to carry workers between Grimsby and Immingham Dock which the Great Central Railway had built on a greenfield site in a sparsely populated area. The line was built by the Great Central and remained in railway ownership up to closure in 1961. It therefore appeared in railway timetables and it was possible to buy through tickets between any of the stops on the line and anywhere on the national railway network, though there never was any physical connection with any conventional track, nor with the tramways in Grimsby and Cleethorpes.

In modern parlance the vehicles would be described as trams, but they were usually referred to locally as "tramcars", with related things being called names such as "tramcar halt" and "tramcar bridge" with "car" a more common short form than "tram."

== Location and facilities ==
The middle section of the line passed through thinly populated marshy farmland. The line was single track with passing places ("loops" in railway parlance) every half mile. The points at the ends of the loops were spring loaded as the line was unsignalled, motormen drove by line of sight. All eight passing loops served as halts, with passengers alighting onto cinders beside the tracks. For the benefit of the few who took advantage of these facilities in the early years each passing loop carried its number on a metal plate. Initially the halts were known as No. 1 Passing Place, No. 2 Passing Place etc. Some were named informally at first, but these names stuck and had become official by 1915. Great Coates Level Crossing was such a halt, taking its name from the rural Woad Lane which crossed the tracks at this point.

No platforms ever existed at any of the stopping places; passengers were expected to board and alight from the roadway or trackside cinders according to the location. The "stations" were much more commonly referred to as "halts" or "stopping places."

Passengers bought their tickets from conductors on board the cars. Great Coates Level Crossing was a Request Stop, people hailed a car by giving a clear signal to the motorman or conductor as appropriate.

== The lines from the station ==
Tramcars arrived from both directions along conventional rails on a reserved way running parallel to the conventional Grimsby District Light Railway, though there was no physical connection between the two. Grooved tram tracks were used on the street section in Grimsby and around Immingham Town.

Loops 3, 4, 6 and 7 were removed in 1917, the materials being contributed to the war effort. After this point the halt at Great Coates Level Crossing stood by plain single track.

== Services ==
Unusually among British tramways services ran round the clock, particularly to provide for railway workers based at Immingham engine shed, whose duties often involved starting or finishing at unsocial hours. Traffic was highly peaked, with convoys of tramcars leaving and arriving to match shift changes at the dock. It was normal for several tramcars to queue to enter and leave Great Coates at the peaks.

After 1945 industry was attracted to the south bank of the Humber, steadily transforming the landscape from rural to urban, though few workers at the new plants lived locally. This led to an increase in ridership and an increase in footfall at Great Coates Level Crossing halt. It also brought a step change in road use along the lane itself. This led to measures not previously needed, such as signalling and crossing barriers.

The east coast floods of 1953 did considerable damage to the tramway's infrastructure, with passengers having to walk between tramcars marooned either side of flooded or washed out sections.

In 1956 over a million passengers used the line and even with deliberate rundown a quarter of a million used it in its last twelve months up to closure in July 1961.

== Closure ==
The line took some years to die. It was cut back at the Grimsby end in 1956. In 1959 it was reduced to peak services only, it disappeared from Bradshaw and through ticketing beyond the line was withdrawn. Formal closure of the line and Great Coates Level Crossing tramcar halt came on Monday 3 July 1961, with the last cars running on Saturday 1 July 1961, when a convoy of six tramcars set off from Immingham Dock, nominally at 14:03. The last tramcar of this convoy and therefore the last from Great Coates was Number 4.

== Aftermath ==
The first track on the line to be removed was at Immingham Dock tramcar station, to give increased parking space. The process of demolition was piecemeal and even in 2013 many hints of the line remained, such as spun concrete masts near Immingham Town.

Former Services

Preceding station	Disused railways	Following station
No. 4 Passing Place; Line and station closed	Great Central Railway; Grimsby and Immingham Electric Railway	Pyewipe Depot Halt; Line and station closed

== Further material ==
- Anderson, Paul (1992). Railways of Lincolnshire. Oldham: Irwell Press. ISBN 1-871608-30-9.
- Bett, W. H.; Gillham, J. C. The Tramways of South Yorkshire and Humberside. Light Railway Transport League.
- Dow, George (1965). Great Central, Volume Three: Fay Sets the Pace, 1900-1922. Shepperton: Ian Allan. ISBN 0-7110-0263-0.
- Ludlam, A.J. (July 2006). Kennedy, Rex (ed.). "Immingham-Gateway to the Continent". Steam Days (203). Bournemouth: Redgauntlet Publications. ISSN 0269-0020.
- Ludlam, A.J. (1996). Railways to New Holland and the Humber Ferries, LP 198. Headington, Oxford: The Oakwood Press. ISBN 0-85361-494-6.
- Electric Traction Archive, vol. 118, B&R Video Productions, contains a fine archive section on the tramway
- The Passing of Pyewipe, Online Video, available via Great Central Railway Society, solely about the tramways of Immingham, Grimsby & Cleethorpes
