= Yarborough Street electric railway station =

Former railway station in England

Yarborough Street

General information
- Location: Grimsby, North East Lincolnshire; England
- Coordinates: 53.5710°N 0.0902°W
- Grid reference: TA265099
- Platforms: 0

Other information
- Status: Disused

History
- Original company: Great Central Railway
- Pre-grouping: Great Central Railway
- Post-grouping: London and North Eastern Railway

Key dates
- 15 May 1912: opened
- 1 July 1956: closed
Location

Yarborough Street electric railway station was the first of five calling points on the 1 1/4 miles (2.0 km) eastern, "street" section of the inter-urban Grimsby and Immingham Electric Railway when travelling from Corporation Bridge, Grimsby to Immingham Dock.

== Overview ==
The electric railway was built primarily to carry workers between Grimsby and Immingham Dock which the Great Central Railway had built on a greenfield site in a sparsely populated area. The line was built by the Great Central and remained in railway ownership up to closure in 1961. It therefore appeared in railway timetables and it was possible to buy through tickets between any of the stops on the line and anywhere on the national railway network, though there never was any physical connection with any conventional track, nor with the tramways in Grimsby and Cleethorpes.

In modern parlance the vehicles would be described as trams, but they were usually referred to locally as "tramcars", with related things being called names such as "tramcar halt" and "tramcar bridge" with "car" a more common short form than "tram."

== Location and facilities ==
Travelling from Corporation Bridge the eastern section of the line passed along the middle of first Corporation Road, then Gilbey Road, Grimsby. This part of the line was single track; it originally had three passing places ("loops" in railway parlance) where the line:

- was met by Yarborough Street
- was met by Beeson Street, and
- passed Little Coates School.

A fourth, turnback, loop was added at the extreme western end of the street running section, west of Cleveland Bridge, in 1956 when the remainder of the street running section closed. Unlike the "country" section of the line, halts did not always coincide with loops.

The points at the ends of the loops were spring loaded. As the line was unsignalled, motormen drove by line of sight.

No platforms ever existed at any of the stopping places; passengers were expected to board and alight from the roadway or trackside cinders according to the location. The "stations" were much more commonly referred to as "halts" or "stopping places."

Passengers bought their tickets from conductors on board the cars.

Yarborough Street halt was a Compulsory Stop throughout its life. It opened with the line in 1912 and was mentioned in the 1914 and 1922 timetables, as well as the 1948 version reproduced in the Grimsby and Immingham Electric Railway article. Although it always appeared in timetables, it never appeared on any ticket or fare table, or maps specifically commissioned to show the line.

== The lines from the station ==
Unlike the "country" section, where conventional track was used, tramcars arrived at Yarborough Street halt from both directions on grooved tram tracks set into the public road, as they were around Immingham Town.

== Services ==
Unusually among British tramways services ran round the clock, particularly to provide for railway workers based at Immingham engine shed, whose duties often involved starting or finishing at unsocial hours. Traffic was highly peaked, with convoys of tramcars leaving and arriving to match shift changes at the dock. It was normal for several tramcars to queue to enter and leave Yarborough Street at the peaks.

After 1945 industry was attracted to the south bank of the Humber, steadily transforming the landscape from rural to urban, though few workers at the new plants lived locally. This led to an increase in ridership and an increase in footfall at Yarborough Street halt. It also coincided with and reinforced a rise in road use along Corporation Road itself, increasing the risk of conflicts and accidents. The tension between tram and rubber wheeled traffic is nowhere better shown than the famous "Tram Pinch" signs at the roadside.

The east coast floods of 1953 did considerable damage to the tramway's infrastructure, with passengers having to walk between tramcars marooned either side of flooded or washed out sections.

In 1956 over a million passengers used the line, nevertheless the roadway section east of Cleveland Bridge, including Yarborough Street halt, closed at midnight on 30 June 1956. The last car to call was original GCR car No. 1.

== Closure ==
The line took some years to die. It was cut back at the Grimsby end in 1956. In 1959 it was reduced to peak services only, it disappeared from Bradshaw and through ticketing beyond the line was withdrawn. Formal closure of the line and Kiln Lane tramcar halt came on Monday 3 July 1961, with the last tramcars running on Saturday 1 July 1961, when a convoy of six tramcars set off from Immingham Dock, nominally at 14:03. The last tramcar of this convoy and therefore the last of all was Number 4.

== Aftermath ==
The first track on the line to be removed was at Immingham Dock tramcar station, to give increased parking space. The process of demolition was piecemeal and even in 2013 many hints of the line remained, such as spun concrete masts near Immingham Town.

Former Services

Preceding station	Disused railways	Following station
Jackson Street; Line and station closed	Great Central Railway; Grimsby and Immingham Electric Railway	Corporation Bridge; Line and station closed

== Further material ==
- Anderson, Paul (1992). Railways of Lincolnshire. Oldham: Irwell Press. ISBN 1-871608-30-9.
- Bett, W. H.; Gillham, J. C. The Tramways of South Yorkshire and Humberside. Light Railway Transport League.
- Dow, George (1965). Great Central, Volume Three: Fay Sets the Pace, 1900-1922. Shepperton: Ian Allan. ISBN 0-7110-0263-0.
- Ludlam, A.J. (July 2006). Kennedy, Rex (ed.). "Immingham-Gateway to the Continent". Steam Days (203). Bournemouth: Redgauntlet Publications. ISSN 0269-0020.
- Ludlam, A.J. (1996). Railways to New Holland and the Humber Ferries, LP 198. Headington, Oxford: The Oakwood Press. ISBN 0-85361-494-6.
- Electric Traction Archive, vol. 118, B&R Video Productions, contains a fine archive section on the tramway
- The Passing of Pyewipe, Online Video, available via Great Central Railway Society, solely about the tramways of Immingham, Grimsby & Cleethorpes
