= Immingham Halt railway station =

Former railway station in England

Immingham Halt

General information
- Location: Immingham, North East Lincolnshire; England
- Coordinates: 53.6175°N 0.1765°W
- Grid reference: TA207149
- Platforms: 1

Other information
- Status: Disused

History
- Original company: Great Central Railway
- Pre-grouping: Great Central Railway

Key dates
- May 1906: opened for workmen's services as "Immingham Road"
- 3 January 1910: upgraded to a publicly advertised halt, named "Immingham Halt"
- 15 May 1912: closed when the nearby Immingham Town opened
Location

Immingham Halt railway station was a temporary terminus serving people involved in building Immingham Dock, Lincolnshire, England. It was originally named "Immingham Road", but was renamed Immingham Halt when it was upgraded from an unadvertised halt for contractors' workmen to a publicly advertised station in 1910, though it appeared in Bradshaw as plain "Immingham".

== History ==
In 1906 Lady Henderson ceremonially cut the first sod to start the Great Central Railway's project to build Immingham Dock on an almost uninhabited, greenfield site on the south bank of the Humber.

The location had no rail access and few of its roads were better than farm tracks, so the Great Central planned three railways to the new dock:

- The Humber Commercial Railway, which was, and in 2015 remained, the main goods artery to and from the dock
- The Grimsby District Light Railway (GDLR), which connected the new dock with the established railways of Grimsby, and
- The Barton and Immingham Light Railway whose main purpose would be to transport workers between the dock and Hull.

The GDLR was the first to reach Immingham, being used by contractors to ferry men and materials from and to Grimsby, including guests for the sod cutting. Contractors obtained a rake of ex-Metropolitan Railway coaches to run unadvertised workmen's services to match their shifts, using makeshift platforms.

This arrangement continued until the Great Central decided there was sufficient demand for a passenger service between Grimsby and Immingham Dock and village to justify upgrading the termini to two unstaffed halts, each with a single 240 feet (73 m) wooden platform, one at the Immingham end of the GDLR, to be known as Immingham Halt, and the other at the Grimsby end, to be known as Grimsby Pyewipe Road. The company would run a service along the line until the planned electric tramway - subsequently to be widely known as the Grimsby and Immingham Electric Railway - opened.

This is exactly what happened. The Great Central's 1904-built steam railcar started to ply between the two termini on 3 January 1910 and continued to do so until 15 May 1912 when the Barton and Immingham had been in business for a year, the Humber Commercial railway was completed and, most importantly for the service along the GDLR, the electric tramway opened, removing the reason for the temporary service.

The Dock was formally opened by The King on Monday 22 July 1912, though some traffic had been handled before then, the first of all being the Great Central steamer Dewsbury which was coaled from the Western Jetty on 17 June 1910; the first to use the dock itself was the Swedish SS Max, also on 15 May 1912.

The GDLR's line through Immingham Halt and Grimsby Pyewipe Road was used for four return special trains on the dock opening day, after which it reverted to its intended goods and internal transfer role, which it retained in 2017, albeit on a much reduced scale.

By 2015 no trace of the station remained.

== Immingham East, an unbuilt neighbour ==
Immingham Halt was the nearest thing the village of Immingham has ever had to a conventional heavy rail station. Plans have been discovered for a station to be called Immingham East, which would have been a two-platformed island structure located on the Grimsby District Light Railway a short distance west of Immingham Halt, adjacent to the concrete road overbridge which carries Queens Road over the tracks to this day. The station was never built.

Former Services

Preceding station	Disused railways	Following station
Grimsby Pyewipe Road	Great Central Railway; Grimsby District Light Railway	Terminus
