= Grimsby engine shed =

Railway depot in Lincolnshire, England

Grimsby
- Interactive map of Grimsby

Location
- Location: Grimsby, North East Lincolnshire, England
- Coordinates: 53.5727°N 0.0762°W

Characteristics
- Owner: Closed
- Type: Steam

History
- Opened: Before 1889
- Closed: Possibly 1912, became sub-shed of Immingham
- Original: Manchester, Sheffield and Lincolnshire Railway
- Pre-grouping: Great Central Railway
- Post-grouping: LNER

Grimsby engine shed was a railway locomotive maintenance depot located southeast of Grimsby Docks station in North East Lincolnshire.

== History ==
Grimsby is an ancient town which was hugely invested in and enlarged by the railways - notably the Manchester, Sheffield and Lincolnshire Railway - in the third quarter of the 19th Century.

Specialist sources agree that the date the shed opened is unknown. It first appears on an OS map published in 1888, where it seems to have had six "roads" (tracks), though all later maps show three tracks under the same general layout. Another source, with local knowledge, states that the shed had six tracks. In 2019 the matter was settled as six roads by a published map and photographs. It had a coaling stage, a turntable and a water tank. In 1898 a water softening plant was installed, the first of its kind on the Great Central Railway.

The shed was eclipsed by the opening of Immingham engine shed in 1912. Despite being five miles away, Immingham soon took over providing long-distance locomotives, leaving Grimsby to service (notably rake out ash, top up with coal and water and give the once-over) locomotives which had come into the docks and were getting ready to go out again and to meet the day-to-day needs of the port's large fleet of "pilot" (shunting and short distance) locomotives. At some point in or after 1912 - again agreed as unknown - Grimsby shed became a sub-shed of Immingham.

Grimsby shed building deteriorated over the years. By 1932 its western gable had gone. In the 1950s the coaling stage and shed roof were demolished, as well as the eastern gable. Thereafter locomotives were stabled in the open.

Locomotive types particularly associated with the shed were ex-GNR Class K3, ex-GCR Class J63, ex-GNR Class J50 and, latterly, LNER Class J94 until dieselisation around 1957.

Lack of clarity surrounds the shed's closure. One source gives 1957, another gives 1961, with demolition by 1962 yet a 1963 ABC Combined Volume still shows both New Holland and Grimsby as subsheds of Immingham. In 1958 a fourth source wrote "..there is no motive power depot in the town."

By 2015 the shed had been demolished and the site built over as part of the Railway Street Industrial Estate.

== See also ==
- List of British Railways shed codes
