= Grimsby District Light Railway =

The Grimsby District Light Railway (GDLR) was one of three standard gauge railways, all part of the Great Central Railway, promoted by the latter to connect the wider world to Immingham Dock which it built in the early 20th century on an almost uninhabited, greenfield site on the south bank of the Humber, England.

== Overview ==
The three railways were:

- The Barton and Immingham Light Railway, which primarily enabled workers to get to the dock from Hull.
- The Humber Commercial Railway, the main artery for goods to and from the dock, and
- The Grimsby District Light Railway, which connected the dock with Grimsby, its established neighbour to the south east.

All three lines became part of the LNER in 1923 then part of the Eastern Region of British Railways on nationalisation in 1948.

The Barton and Immingham route closed in 1963.

In 2016 the Humber Commercial Railway route remained the port's major artery, carrying imports towards Barnetby and beyond.

By 2016 the GDLR survived, having been renamed the Grimsby Light Single.

== The line's purposes ==
The GDLR's immediate purpose was to convey men and materials to the dock workings, with the primary permanent aim of enabling workers to travel between Grimsby and the dock to work. The secondary permanent aim was to enable materials and especially locomotives to transfer between the new engine shed at Immingham and the intensively railway-served port of Grimsby and the railway-promoted seaside resort of Cleethorpes.

The GDLR became a railway with two lines - a conventional light railway used by ordinary trains and an electric tramway which ran parallel to the conventional line for a significant part of its route. This tramway was publicised by the Great Central as the Grimsby District Electric Railway and later by the LNER as the Grimsby and Immingham Electric Railway, by which name it became widely recognised, but legally, all three were one, as set out in a light railway order of 15 January 1906. The two lines were not physically connected.

== Early uses ==
The conventional line was completed in May 1906, connecting at its south eastern end to the Great Central's Great Coates branch and thereby to the Grimsby to Sheffield Victoria line and the wider world. It was initially single track. At its Immingham end it ended in a field near what would eventually become Immingham East Junction. Lady Henderson performed the ceremonial cutting of the first sod for the massive Immingham Dock undertaking near this spot on 12 July 1906, with the VIP party brought to the site in the GCR directors' saloon and lesser guests brought in open wagons, spruced up for the occasion. Both trains used the GDLR.

Contractors building the dock used the conventional line for the next three years, mainly transporting materials, but also transporting workmen in a train of ex-Metropolitan Railway carriages, which became known locally as the "Navvy Mail". The Great Central decided to provide a public passenger service along the line and built 240 feet (73 m) single wooden platformed stations 4 miles 14 chains (6.7 km) apart named Grimsby Pyewipe Road and Immingham Halt. The line and the stations were inspected by the Board of Trade on 3 January 1910 and services started the same day using a steam rail car.

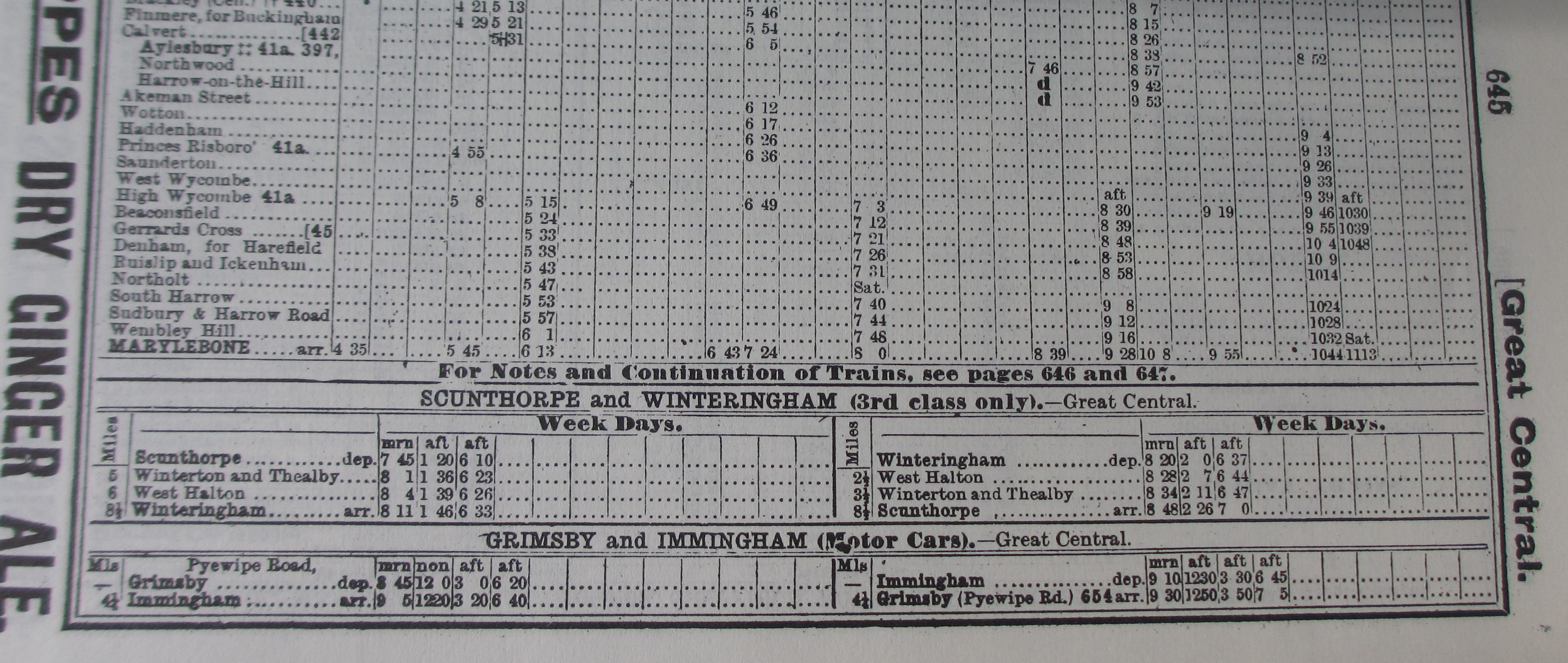
Part of Page 645 of April 1910 British public railway timetable, aka Bradshaw's Guide

It was intended that part of the GDLR would be an electric, passenger-carrying tramway to transport highly peaked flows of workers between the dock and Grimsby, the nearest centre of population. The Grimsby District Light Railways Order 1906 permitted the construction of a line from a triangular junction with Great Grimsby Street Tramways at the confluence of Victoria Street and Freeport Wharf, over Corporation Bridge then along Corporation Road and across country to Immingham Dock. This permission did not imply any legal or managerial connection between the line and Grimsby Tramways, merely permission to build a physical connection and, by implication, permission to run trams over both concerns' metals by agreement. This would seem a triumph of optimism over sense, as Corporation Bridge was not strong enough to carry trams and there were no firm plans or money to replace it. When it was eventually replaced in 1928, with heavy government financial backing, the wind had left Grimsby Tramways' sails and they were converting to trolley bus and internal combustion engine services. Corporation Bridge was a bridge too far.

Orders for the construction of the electric tramway were placed in 1909 and the line passed inspection in November 1911, though with the dock not yet completed there was no urgency to open the line. A trial service was run on 6 May 1912, followed by a "Big Bang" undertaken without ceremony on 15 May 1912 when:

- the Humber Commercial railway was completed, connecting with the GDLR at Immingham East Junction,
- the GDLR's electric tramway was opened between Immingham Town and Corporation Bridge, and
- the service between Grimsby Pyewipe Road and Immingham Halt along the conventional GDLR line was withdrawn

From this point readers are referred to the Grimsby and Immingham Electric Railway article for details of the tramway's development and decline.

== The line's evolution ==
Electric cables running from the power station at Immingham Dock to feeders along the tramway were carried on distinctive masts along the seaward side of the GDLR's conventional line, lending it an unusual appearance. The masts vaguely resembled commonplace lineside telegraph masts, but their narrow A-shaped structure and heavier wire-bearing crosspieces were sufficiently different to catch the eye.

The conventional GDLR line was doubled in 1914, only to be singled in 1917, the lifted tracks being sent abroad as a contribution to the war effort. The Great Central's final estimates in 1922 included provision for reinstating the second track, but the LNER never did so. Towards the end of the Second World War Grimsby Corporation bought substantial tracts of land between the GDLR and the Humber Bank for post-war industrial development. The 200 acres (81 hectares) Humber Bank Estate was fully allocated by 1948 and other sites were also taken up, such as Fisons at Immingham. To match this development British Railways started to redouble the conventional GDLR line in November 1948, completing the task on 17 September 1951. Several of the wholly new, greenfield site industries, like Immingham Dock years before, obtained rail connections, changing the character of the GDLR's conventional line from a plain, rural, inter-urban connection to one with sidings and varied goods trains. Over time five sidings were laid, three heading towards the Humber Bank and two inland. In 2015 all could still be traced online using aerial and satellite images, though all had closed to traffic. Still in 2024, many of the removed sidings can still be spotted, the main give-away being curved lines of trees on the old alignments. In 1984 one track towards the southern end of the line was lifted and the remainder followed towards the end of the 20th Century, meaning the GDLR's conventional track has twice been doubled and twice been singled.

This industrial development had consequences for the GDLR's conventional line besides the upturn in rail traffic. The huge growth in road traffic – from near zero – by lorries and employees put pressure on the level crossings. This, together with the specific example of an accident on 7 April 1954 when a light engine collided with a van at Kiln Lane level crossing, resulted in the crossings adjacent to Kiln Lane and Great Coates tramcar halts having signalling and lifting barriers installed and the lineside electricity cables being buried. The signalling introduced on both the electric and the conventional line was two aspect – red and white.

Speed limits – a blanket 25 mph by virtue of its status as a light railway – have often been reduced to 10 mph near crossings or because of poor track conditions.

The 1953 East Coast floods disrupted the electric tramway, with the GDLR's conventional line proving invaluable to ferry men and materials to effect repairs.

The line today has found occasional use for passenger diversions and enthusiasts' specials, as well as continuing to see occasional freight to and from Immingham, light movements for driver training, and engineering trains.

== Relationship with the electric tramway ==
On 1 July 1961 the electric tramway closed, thereby depriving the GDLR's conventional line of an occasional traffic – transporting major items, notably tramcars, to and from the tramway's Pyewipe car sheds for heavy maintenance or repair. This was always a challenge, as there never was any physical connection between the tramway and any other line, but a track at the shed was adjacent to the GDLR conventional line, so cars and other large items were craned over from one to the other. After the Second World War, when the expansion of industry on the Humber Bank was bringing unprecedented usage to both the conventional and electric lines, surplus tramcars were bought first from Newcastle Corporation then from Gateshead Tramways. The Newcastle cars were transshipped without mishap, but when the Gateshead cars were being lifted over in 1951 a crane toppled onto one, damaging it beyond repair before it turned a wheel in Lincolnshire.

The death-throes of the electric line led to two recorded, public, suggestions being made that passenger services be run along the GDLR's conventional line. On 16 March 1955 The British Transport Commission chairman, Sir Brian Robertson, visited and in a speech said that the commission would consider running diesel multiple units (DMUs) or, astonishingly, electrical multiple units along the line if the tramway closed, but that this would only be feasible if a direct road between Grimsby and Immingham was not going to happen. The politicking reappeared on 29 December 1960 when British Railways announced that if their application to withdraw the tramway was refused they would run a DMU service on the GDLR conventional line, competing with Grimsby Council's bus service. The council subsequently withdrew its objection to closing the tramway.

== The modern position ==
Neighbouring lines were resignalled over Christmas 2015 with the "Immingham Light Railway" shown on a map and in text as a live line with current signalboxes at Pyewipe Road and Great Coates No.1. Part 2 of the article confirms the line remains open, primarily as a diversionary route, so Immingham can remain accessible if the main Humber Commercial Railway route through Ulceby is closed or overloaded. This is both corroborated and confused by the authoritative "Trackwatch", which confirms the arrangements but refers to the line as "Grimsby Light Single".

In late 2025, GBRf and Freightliner began alternately operating weekly Aggregate trains to H. Cope & Sons, who unload the hopper wagons between Pyewipe Road and Great Coates No.1, with the trains being split into several sections to not block Pyewipe Level Crossing whilst unloading.

== See also ==
- Great Grimsby and Sheffield Junction Railway (Grimsby-New Holland)
- Grimsby and Immingham Electric Railway (Grimsby-Immingham)
- Barton and Immingham Light Railway (Immingham-Barton upon Humber)
