= Immingham Dock electric railway station =

Former railway station in Lincolnshire, England

Immingham Dock
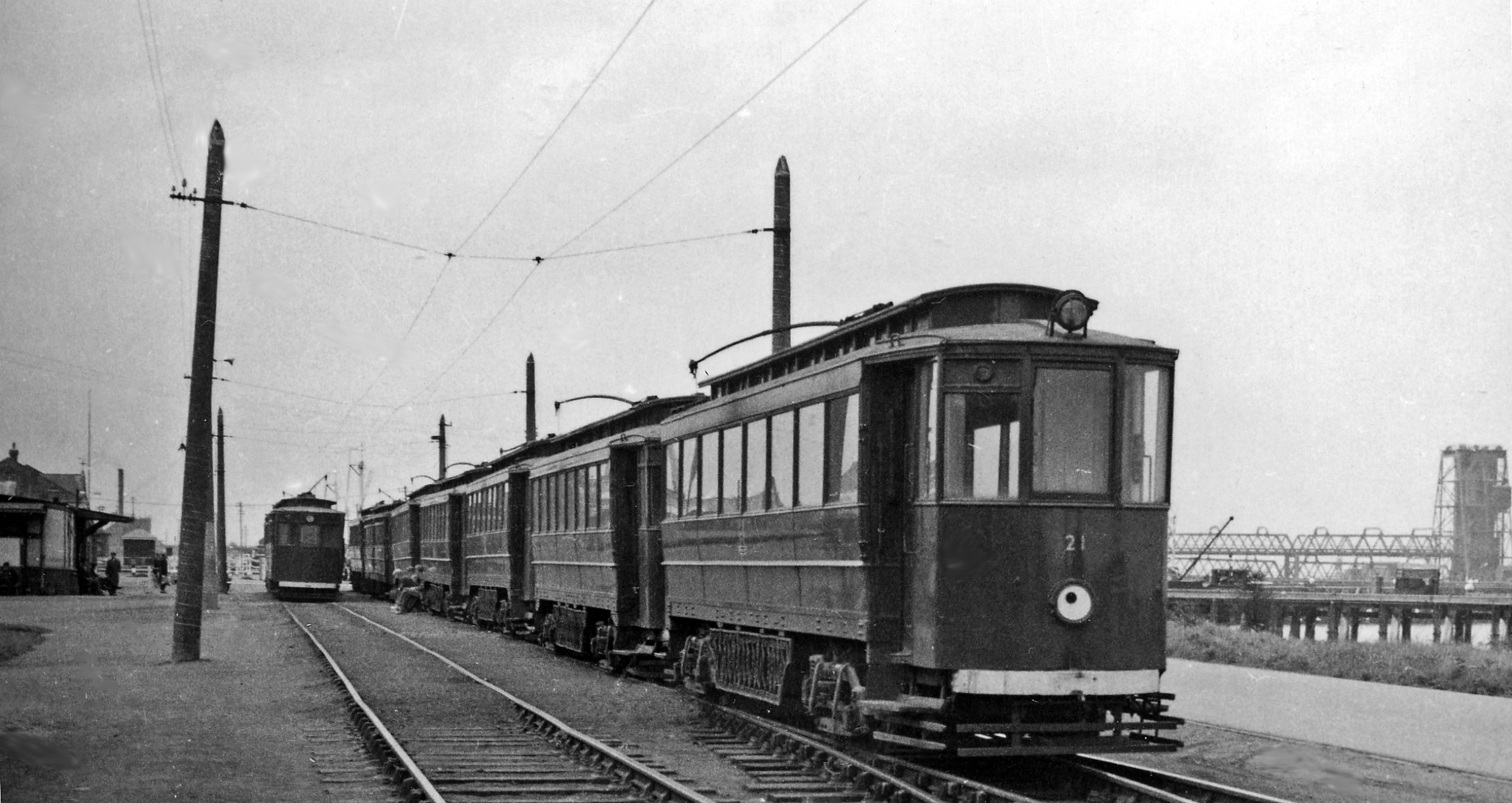
- Grimsby & Immingham Electric Railway at Immingham Dock in 1958

General information
- Location: Immingham, North East Lincolnshire; England
- Coordinates: 53.62987°N 0.18646°W
- Grid reference: TA200163
- Platforms: 0

Other information
- Status: Disused

History
- Original company: Great Central Railway
- Pre-grouping: Great Central Railway
- Post-grouping: London and North Eastern Railway

Key dates
- 17 November 1913: opened
- 3 July 1961: closed
Location

Immingham Dock electric railway station was the western terminus of the inter-urban Grimsby and Immingham Electric Railway which ran from Corporation Bridge, Grimsby with a reversal at what was euphemistically called Immingham Town.

== Overview ==
The electric railway was built primarily to carry workers between Grimsby and Immingham Dock which the Great Central Railway had built on a greenfield site in a sparsely populated area. The line was built by the Great Central and remained in railway ownership until its closure in 1961. It therefore appeared in railway timetables and it was possible to buy through tickets between any of the stops on the line and anywhere on the national railway network, though there never was any physical connection with any conventional track, nor with the tramways in Grimsby and Cleethorpes.

In modern parlance the vehicles would be described as trams, but they were typically referred to locally and in publications such as Bradshaw as "cars" or "tramcars", with related things being named "tramcar halt" and "tramcar bridge." "Car" was always the more common short form than "tram."

== Location and facilities ==
Dock tramcar station was situated on the southeast side of the dock's main entrance lock and at right angles to it. Directly opposite the station on the other side of the lock was a conventional railway station, also called Immingham Dock Lines from the two set off in opposite directions.

The line was a tramway, no platforms ever existed at any of the stopping places; passengers were expected to board and alight from the roadway or trackside cinders according to the location. The "stations" were much more commonly referred to as "halts" or "stopping places."

A waiting room was provided at Dock tramcar station. Passengers bought tickets on board from the conductor. Timetables and tickets consistently used the name "Immingham Dock" throughout the terminus's life.

The line's two termini - Corporation Bridge and Immingham Dock - were the only halts on the line to attempt anything along the lines of railway nameboards, both proclaimed themselves in very large letters to be a "TRAMWAY STATION."

== The line from the station ==
After the end of the cindered station area the line was conventional double track running alongside the dock road, giving the appearance of a conventional railway, except for the absence of fencing between road and rail. At Habrough Marsh Drain bridge a little over half a mile from the station road and rail merged, with the tracks changing to grooved tramway common throughout all road tramways. This spot was and remains the eastern boundary of dock property. In 2012 this was a continuously staffed entrance checkpoint with barriers to road vehicles and pedestrians. In the 1950s and 1960s the spot was completely unmarked, with not so much as a sign to indicate entering or leaving the dock. From mid-1916 to July 1920 a halt was provided here, whose purpose is unclear. It may have been a version of the modern checkpoint or to serve works which ended with the war.

From this point road and tramtracks climbed one of the two "hills" on the whole line, i.e. the bridge over the conventional Grimsby District Light Railway line near Immingham East Junction. This bridge, which was in regular, heavy road use in 2015, was known locally as "tramcar bridge." At the other side of the bridge was "Tramcar Halt", or, formally, Immingham Town.

== Services ==
Unusually among British tramways services ran round the clock, particularly to provide for railway workers based at Immingham engine shed, whose duties often involved starting or finishing at unsocial hours. Traffic was highly peaked, with convoys of tramcars leaving and arriving to match shift changes at the dock. It was normal for several tramcars to rest at Dock station between peaks.

In 1956 over a million passengers used the line and even with deliberate rundown a quarter of a million used it in its last twelve months up to closure in July 1961.

== Closure ==
The line took some years to die, being cut back at the Grimsby end in 1956 then reduced to peak services only in 1959, when it disappeared from Bradshaw and through ticketing beyond the line was withdrawn. Formal closure of the line and Dock tramcar station came on Monday 3 July 1961, with the last tramcars running on Saturday 1 July 1961 when a convoy of six tramcars set off, nominally at 14:03. The last tramcar of this convoy and therefore the last from the Immingham terminus was Number 4.

== Aftermath ==
The first track on the line to be removed was at Dock tramcar station, to give increased parking space. The process of demolition was piecemeal and even in 2013 many hints of the line remained, such as spun concrete masts near Tramcar Bridge.

Former Services

Preceding station	Disused railways	Following station
Eastern Entrance to Immingham Dock	Great Central Railway; Grimsby and Immingham Electric Railway	Terminus

== Further material ==
- Anderson, Paul (1992). Railways of Lincolnshire. Oldham: Irwell Press. ISBN 978-1-871608-30-4.
- Electric Traction Archive, vol. 118, Uffington, Shropshire: B&R Video Productions, contains a fine archive section on the tramway
- The Passing of Pyewipe, Online Video, available via Great Central Railway Society, solely about the tramways of Immingham, Grimsby & Cleethorpes
