= Immingham Town electric railway station =

Former railway station in England

Immingham Town
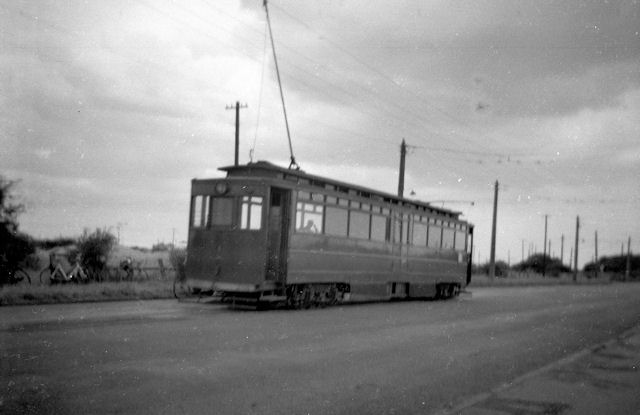
- Tramcar at Immingham Town

General information
- Location: Immingham, North East Lincolnshire; England
- Coordinates: 53.6167°N 0.1800°W
- Grid reference: TA204148
- Platforms: 0

Other information
- Status: Disused

History
- Original company: Great Central Railway
- Pre-grouping: Great Central Railway
- Post-grouping: London and North Eastern Railway

Key dates
- 15 May 1912: opened
- 3 July 1961: closed
Location

Immingham Town electric railway station was the penultimate unconditional stop on the inter-urban Grimsby and Immingham Electric Railway when travelling from Corporation Bridge, Grimsby to Immingham Dock. All tramcars reversed here.

The halt was the line's temporary western terminus for the eighteen months from opening until the extension to the permanent terminus at Immingham Dock was opened on 17 November 1913. Throughout this period the halt appeared on tickets as plain "Immingham", being permanently "Immingham Town" thereafter.

== Overview ==
The electric railway was built primarily to carry workers between Grimsby and the dock facilities, Immingham Dock having been built on a greenfield site in a sparsely populated area. The line was built by the Great Central Railway and remained in railway ownership up to closure in 1961. It therefore appeared in railway timetables and it was possible to buy through tickets between any of the stops on the line and anywhere on the national railway network, though there never was any physical connection with any conventional track, nor with the tramways in Grimsby and Cleethorpes.

In modern parlance the vehicles would be described as trams, but they were typically referred to locally and in publications such as Bradshaw as "cars" or "tramcars", with related things being called names such as "tramcar halt" and "tramcar bridge." "Car" was always a more common short form than "tram."

== Location and facilities ==
Immingham Town - known locally as "Tramcar Halt" - was situated outside the dock estate in what in 2012 was still open country. It was the nearest point to the line for its two lesser markets - railwaymen travelling to and from Immingham engine shed and residents of the village of Immingham, by far the greatest market being dock workers. The station was nevertheless a third of a mile from the engine shed and a good mile from the village proper.

The line was a tramway, no platforms ever existed at any of the stopping places; passengers were expected to board and alight from the roadway or trackside cinders according to the location. The "stations" were much more commonly referred to as "halts" or "stopping places." In the case of Immingham Town the tracks ran along a metalled road, giving passengers a firm footing at least.

A wooden waiting shelter was provided at Immingham Town, but it gave scant protection from the elements. During the Second World War this was replaced by an altogether more substantial brick shelter designed to double as an air raid shelter. This structure was still in place in 2013.

Passengers bought tickets from the conductor on board the cars.

== The lines from the station ==
Tramcars arrived from Immingham Dock down the grooved double track southern slope of one of the two "hills" on the whole line, i.e. the bridge over the conventional Grimsby District Light Railway line near Immingham East Junction. This bridge, which was in regular, heavy road use in 2015, was known locally as "tramcar bridge." All cars reversed at Immingham Town, a process which took several minutes as the conductor had to unhook the rear trolley pole from the overhead wire then attach the front one, which would become the rear one on reversing. On restarting the tramcar would swing right off the public road, change from grooved rails to conventional and merge to become a single track on a reserved way running parallel to the conventional Grimsby District Light Railway line through open, marshy farmland. Tramcars running in the opposite direction followed the same procedure in reverse.

This was not quite the whole story. When the line was proposed it included plans to continue from Immingham Town southwest along Queens Road to a point near the footpath to the engine shed, or "Loco" as it was called locally. When the line was completed in 1913 the extension was omitted. Influential fingers were wagged so the company grudgingly built it to what would have been Queens Road Halt. Proving tramcars ran every quarter to maintain the right of way, but no revenue earning vehicle ever traversed it. The overhead wires and points were removed in the Second World War and all trace of the branch had gone by 1955.

== Services ==
Unusually among British tramways services ran round the clock, particularly to provide for railway workers based at Immingham engine shed, whose duties often involved starting or finishing at unsocial hours. Traffic was highly peaked, with convoys of tramcars leaving and arriving to match shift changes at the dock. It was normal for several tramcars to queue to reverse at Immingham Town at the peaks.

In 1956 over a million passengers used the line and even with deliberate rundown a quarter of a million used it in its last twelve months up to closure in July 1961.

== Closure ==
The line took some years to die, being cut back at the Grimsby end in 1956 then reduced to peak services only in 1959, when it disappeared from Bradshaw and through ticketing beyond the line was withdrawn. Formal closure of the line and Immingham Town tramcar halt came on Monday 3 July 1961, with the last tramcars running on Saturday 1 July 1961, when a convoy of six tramcars set off from Immingham Dock, nominally at 14:03. The last tramcar of this convoy and therefore the last from Immingham Town was Number 4.

== Aftermath ==
The first track on the line to be removed was at Dock tramcar station, to give increased parking space. The process of demolition was piecemeal and even in 2013 many hints of the line remained, such as spun concrete masts near Immingham Town.

Former Services

Preceding station	Disused railways	Following station
Queens Road; Line built but never opened	Great Central Railway; Grimsby and Immingham Electric Railway	Eastern Entrance to Immingham Dock; Line and station closed
Queens Road; Line built but never opened	Great Central Railway; Grimsby and Immingham Electric Railway	Kiln Lane; Line and station closed

== Further material ==
- Anderson, Paul (1992). Railways of Lincolnshire. Oldham: Irwell Press. ISBN 978-1-871608-30-4.
- Bett, W. H.; Gillham, J. C. (1979). Price, J.H. (ed.). The Tramways of South Yorkshire and Humberside. London: Light Railway Transport League. ISBN 978-0-900433-75-7.
- Ludlam, A.J. (1996). Railways to New Holland and the Humber Ferries. Headington: The Oakwood Press. ISBN 978-0-85361-494-4. LP 198.
- Electric Traction Archive, vol. 118, Uffington, Shropshire: B&R Video Productions, contains a fine archive section on the tramway
- The Passing of Pyewipe, Online Video, available via Great Central Railway Society, solely about the tramways of Immingham, Grimsby & Cleethorpes
