= Immingham engine shed =

Railway maintenance depot

Immingham TMD
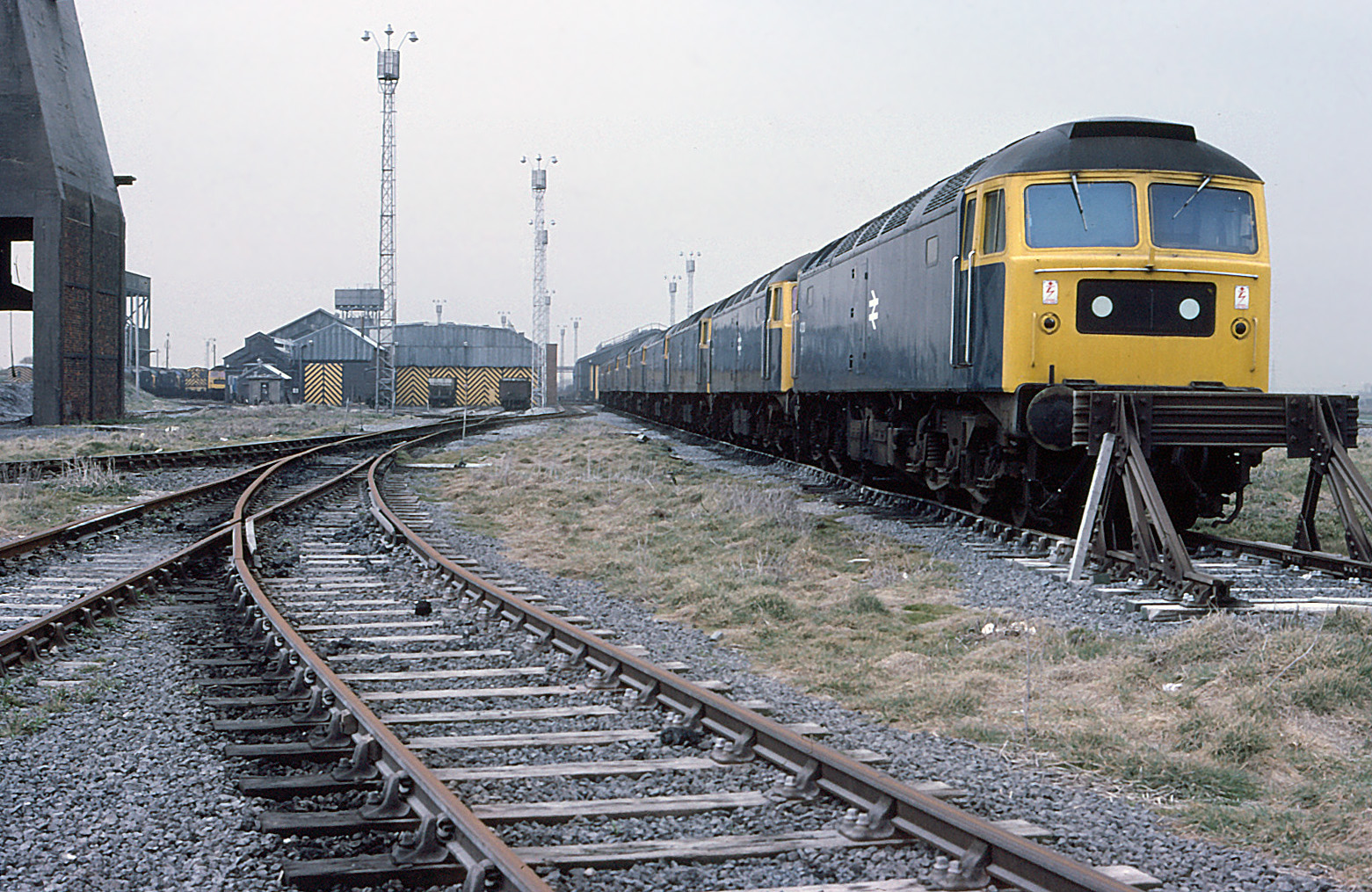
- Immingham engine shed and locomotives 1978
- Interactive map of Immingham TMD

Location
- Location: Immingham, North East Lincolnshire, England
- Coordinates: 53.619°N 0.1894°W
- OS grid: TA197151

Characteristics
- Owner: DB Schenker
- Depot code: 40B (1948-1973); IM (1973–present)
- Type: Diesel

History
- Opened: 1912
- Original: Great Central Railway
- Pre-grouping: London and North Eastern Railway
- Post-grouping: British Railways

Immingham engine shed, also known as Immingham depot, or more recently as Immingham TMD and always locally as Loco is a railway maintenance depot (traction maintenance depot) located on the Immingham Dock estate, in North East Lincolnshire, England. The depot code is IM.

In 2015 the depot was operated by DB Schenker. A separate TMD also known as Immingham TMD, but with the depot code IN, is operated by Freightliner.

== History ==
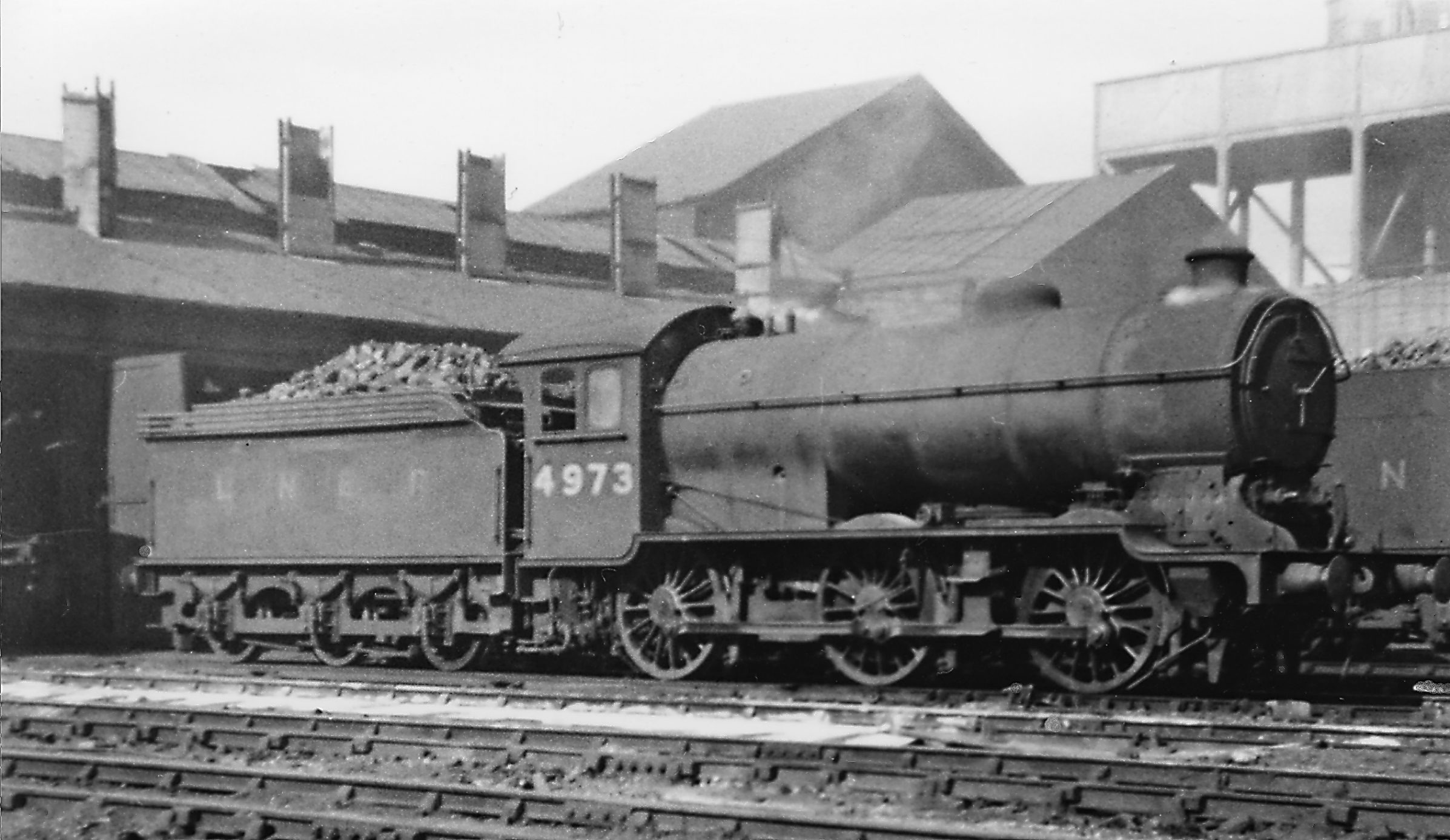
LNER Class J39 at the shed (1947)

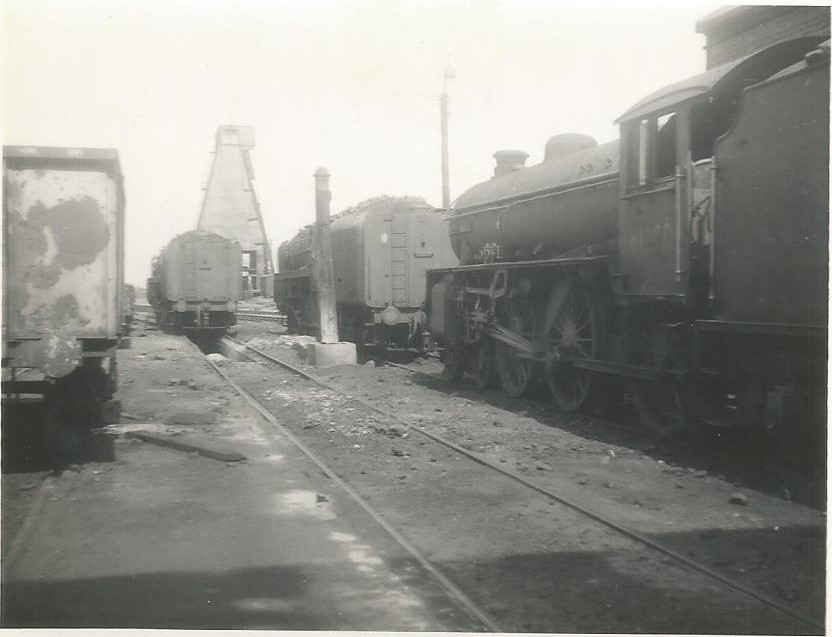
Shed building behind the camera, two 9F 2-10-0s and a named B1 4-6-0 in shot (1964)

The engine shed was built by the Humber Commercial Dock and Railway company in the southeastern corner of the Immingham Dock estate. As initially built the engine shed had twelve "roads" (tracks) providing facilities for 60 locomotives.

The railways at Immingham were worked by the Great Central Railway, the developer of the Port. In 1923 it was taken over by the LNER and then became part of the Eastern Region of British Railways in 1948.

During the LNER period (1930s) a concrete automatic coaling stage was added to the facilities.

During the British Railways period the facility had a shed code of 40B and had two sub-sheds: New Holland and Grimsby.

At its peak the shed had an allotment of over 120 locomotives, with 12 stabling roads – part of the building was demolished in the 1950s and a diesel depot constructed.

Soon after opening a dormitory block was built near the turntable for use by visiting crews on lodging turns.

A new 78 feet 9 inches (24.00 m) x 367 feet 6 inches (112.01 m) diesel shed was built in 1966 south east of the steam shed, which was converted to wagon repair. In 1966 it had 90 diesels, plus 35 shunters.

Steam locomotive types deployed include LNER Thompson Class B1, LMS Stanier Class 8F, and BR standard class 9F.

The last steam locomotive worked from the shed was No.61058 (LNER B1) on 7 February 1966, which hauled a train of empty wagons to Markham Colliery.

Following the splitting up of the former BR Trainload business into three companies in 1994, the depot came briefly under the control of "shadow privatisation company" Loadhaul. Loadhaul was acquired and merged into English Welsh & Scottish in 1995.

The TOPS depot code for the EWS/DB Schenker depot at Immingham is IM, and for the Freightliner Traction Maintenance Depot at Immingham, IN.

As a result of centralisation of maintenance activities by EWS to Toton TMD the shed was used only for storage of out of service locomotives.

== See also ==
- List of British Railways shed codes
