= List of closed railway stations in Great Britain: K–L =

The list of closed railway stations in Great Britain includes the following: Year of closure is given if known. Stations reopened as heritage railways continue to be included in this list and some have been linked. Some stations have been reopened to passenger traffic. Some lines remain in use for freight and mineral traffic.

== K ==
=== Ke ===
Station (Town, unless in station name)	Rail company	Year closed	Notes
Keadby	South Yorkshire Railway	1874	
Keekle Colliers' Platform	Cleator and Workington Junction Railway	1923	
Keele	North Staffordshire Railway	1956	
Keele Park	North Staffordshire Railway	1907	
Kegworth	Midland Railway	1968	
Keinton Mandeville	GWR	1962	
Keith Town	Great North of Scotland Railway	1968	
Kelmarsh	L&NWR	1960	
Kelmscott and Langford	GWR	1962	
Kelso	North British Railway	1964	
Kelston	Midland Railway	1949	
Kelty	North British Railway	1930	
Kelvedon Low Level	GER	1951	
Kelvinbridge	Glasgow Central Railway	1952	
Kelvin Hall	Lanarkshire and Dunbartonshire Railway	1964	
Kelvinside	Lanarkshire and Dunbartonshire Railway	1942	
Kemnay	Great North of Scotland Railway	1950	
Kemp Town	London, Brighton and South Coast Railway	1933	
Kempsey	Birmingham and Gloucester Railway	1844	
Kempston and Elstow Halt	L&NWR	1941	
Kenfig Hill	GWR	1958	
Kenilworth	L&NWR	1965	reopened 2018
Kennethmont	Great North of Scotland Railway	1968	
Kensal Green & Harlesden	Hampstead Junction Railway	1873	
Kensington	West London Railway	1844	
Kentallen	Caledonian Railway	1966	
Kenton (Suffolk)	Mid-Suffolk Light Railway	1952	
Kenton Bank (Northumberland)	North Eastern Railway	1929	
Kenwith Castle Halt	Bideford, Westward Ho! and Appledore Railway	1917	
Kenyon Junction	L&NWR	1961	
Kerne Bridge	GWR	1959	
Kerry (Powys)	Oswestry and Newtown Railway	1931	
Kershope Foot	North British Railway	1969	
Keswick	Cockermouth, Keswick and Penrith Railway	1972	
Ketches Farm Halt	Bluebell Railway		date unknown
Ketley	GWR	1962	
Ketley Town Halt	GWR	1962	
Kettleness	NER	1958	
Ketton and Collyweston	Midland Railway	1966	
Kew (London)	North and South Western Junction Railway	1866	
Kew Gardens (Southport)	Lancashire and Yorkshire Railway	1938	
Keyingham	NER	1964	
Keymer Junction	London, Brighton and South Coast Railway	1883	

=== Ki ===
Station (Town, unless in station name)	Rail company	Year closed	Notes
Kibworth	Midland Railway	1968	
Kidlington	GWR	1964	
Kidsgrove Liverpool Road	North Staffordshire Railway	1964	
Kidsgrove Market Street Halt	North Staffordshire Railway	1950	
Kidwelly Flats Halt	GWR	1957	
Kielder Forest	North British Railway	1956	
Kilbagie	North British Railway	1930	
Kilbarchan	Glasgow and South Western Railway	1966	
Kilbirnie	Glasgow and South Western Railway	1966	
Kilbirnie South	Lanarkshire and Ayrshire Railway	1930	
Kilbowie	Caledonian Railway	1964	
Kilbowie	North British Railway	1907	
Kilburn (Derbyshire)	Midland Railway	1930	
Kilconquhar	North British Railway	1965	
Kildary	Highland Railway	1960	
Kildrummie Platform	Inverness and Nairn Railway	1858	
Kildwick; Kildwick and Cross Hills; Kildwick and Crosshills	Midland Railway	1965	
Kilgerran Halt	GWR	1962	
Kilkerran	Glasgow and South Western Railway	1965	
Killamarsh Central	Great Central Railway	1963	
Killamarsh West (1st)	North Midland Railway	1843	
Killamarsh West (2nd)	North Midland Railway	1954	
Killay	LNWR	1964	
Killearn	North British Railway	1951	
Killiecrankie	Highland Railway	1965	
Killin	Killin Railway	1965	
Killin Junction (1st)	Callander and Oban Railway	1886	
Killin Junction (2nd)	Callander and Oban Railway	1965	
Killingholme	Great Central Railway	1963	
Killingholme Admiralty Platform	Great Central Railway	1963	
Killingworth	NER	1958	
Killochan	Glasgow and South Western Railway	1951	
Killywhan	Glasgow and South Western Railway	1959	
Kilmacolm	Greenock and Ayrshire Railway	1983	
Kilmany	North British Railway	1951	
Kiln Lane	Grimsby and Immingham Tramway	1961	
Kilnhurst Central (1st)	Great Central Railway	1871	
Kilnhurst Central (2nd)	Great Central Railway	1968	
Kilnhurst West (1st)	Midland Railway	1851	
Kilnhurst West (2nd)	Midland Railway	1968	
Kilsby and Crick	LNWR	1960	
Kilsyth New	Kilsyth and Bonnybridge Railway	1935	
Kilsyth Old	North British Railway	1951	
Kilwinning East	Caledonian Railway	1932	
Kimberley East	GNR	1964	
Kimberley Park	GER	1969	
Kimberley West	Midland Railway	1917	
Kimbolton	Midland Railway	1959	
Kinaldie	Great North of Scotland Railway	1964	
Kinbuck	Caledonian Railway	1956	
Kincardine	North British Railway	1930	
Kincraig	Highland	1965	
Kineton	East and West Junction Railway	1952	
Kinfauns	Caledonian Railway	1950	
King Edward	Great North of Scotland Railway	1951	
King Tor Halt	Great Western Railway	1956	
King William Street	City and South London Railway	1900	
Kingennie	Caledonian Railway	1955	
Kings Cliffe	L&NWR	1966	
Kings Cross Thameslink	Metropolitan Railway	2007	
Kings Cross York Road	Great Northern Railway	1976	
Kings Ferry Bridge North Halt	South Eastern and Chatham Railway	1923	
Kings Heath	Midland Railway	1941	reopened 2026
King's Inch	Glasgow and Paisley Joint Railway	1926	
Kings Worthy	Great Western Railway	1960	
Kingsbarns	NBR	1930	
Kingsbridge (Devon)	GWR	1963	
Kingsbury	Midland Railway	1968	
Kingscote	London, Brighton and South Coast Railway	1955	reopened by the Bluebell Railway
Kingshouse Platform	Callander and Oban Railway	1965	
Kingskerswell	GWR	1964	
Kingskettle	NBR	1967	
Kingsland (Herefordshire)	GWR	1955	
Kingsland (London)	North London Railway	1865	reopened 1983
Kingsley and Froghall	North Staffordshire Railway	1965	reopened 2001
Kingsley Halt	London and South Western Railway	1957	
Kingsmuir	Caledonian Railway	1955	
Kingston Crossing Halt	GWR	1957	
Kingston Road	Weston, Clevedon and Portishead Railway	1940	
Kingston-on-Sea	London, Brighton and South Coast Railway	1879	
Kingswear	GWR	date unknown	reopened by Paignton and Dartmouth Steam Railway
Kingthorpe	GNR	1951	
Kington	GWR	1955	
Kinloss (1st)	Highland Railway	1860	
Kinloss (2nd)	Highland Railway	1965	
Kinmel Bay Halt	L&NWR	1939	
Kinneil	North British Railway	1930	
Kinnerley Junction	Potteries, Shrewsbury & North Wales Railway/Shropshire and Montgomeryshire Railway	1933	
Kinnersley	Midland Railway	1962	
Kinnerton	L&NWR	1962	
Kinross	North British Railway	1860	
Kinross Junction	North British Railway	1970	
Kintore	Great North of Scotland Railway	1964	new station opened 2020
Kiplingcotes	NER	1965	
Kippax	NER	1951	
Kippen	NBR	1934	
Kirby	York and North Midland Railway	1858	
Kirbymoorside	NER	1953	
Kirby Muxloe	Midland Railway	1964	
Kirby Park	Birkenhead Railway	1954	
Kirk Michael	Manx Northern Railway	1968	
Kirk Smeaton	Hull and Barnsley Railway	1932	
Kirkandrews	North British Railway	1964	
Kirkbank	North British Railway	1948	
Kirkbride	North British Railway	1964	
Kirkbuddo	Caledonian Railway	1955	
Kirkburton	L&NWR	1930	
Kirkby Bentinck	Great Central Railway	1963	
Kirkby Lonsdale	L&NWR	1954	
Kirkby Stephen East	NER	1962	
Kirkby Stephen West	Midland Railway	1970	reopened 1986
Kirkby Thore	NER	1953	
Kirkby-in-Ashfield Central	Great Central Railway	1956	
Kirkby-in-Ashfield East	Midland Railway	1964	
Kirkcowan	Portpatrick and Wigtownshire Joint Railway	1965	
Kirkcudbright	Glasgow and South Western Railway	1965	
Kirkgunzeon	Glasgow and South Western Railway	1950	
Kirkham Abbey	York and North Midland Railway	1930	
Kirkheaton	L&NWR	1930	
Kirkinch	Scottish Midland Junction Railway	1847	
Kirkinner	Portpatrick and Wigtownshire Joint Railway	1950	
Kirkintilloch	Edinburgh and Glasgow Railway	1964	
Kirkintilloch Basin	Monklands Railway	1846	
Kirkland	Glasgow and South Western Railway	1943	
Kirklee	Caledonian Railway	1939	
Kirklington and Edingley	Midland Railway	1929	
Kirkliston	North British Railway	1930	
Kirknewton (Northumberland)	NER	1930	
Kirkpatrick	Caledonian Railway	1960	
Kirkseaton Crossing	Whitehaven and Furness Junction Railway	1857	
Kirkstall	Midland Railway	1965	
Kirkstall Forge	Leeds and Bradford Railway	1905	reopened 2016
Kirkton Bridge Halt	Great North of Scotland Railway	1965	
Kirriemuir	Caledonian Railway	1952	
Kirriemuir Junction	Scottish North Eastern Railway	1864	
Kirtlebridge	Caledonian Railway	1960	
Kirton	GNR	1961	
Kissthorns	Sand Hutton Light Railway	1930	
Kittybrewster	Great North of Scotland Railway	1968	

=== Kn ===
Station (Town, unless in station name)	Rail company	Year closed	Notes
Knapton	NER	1930	
Knaresborough Hay Park Lane	East and West Yorkshire Junction Railway	1851	
Knightwick	GWR	1964	
Knitsley	NER	1939	
Knock	Great North of Scotland Railway	1968	
Knockaloe	Isle of Man Railway	1920	
Knockando (Dalbeallie)	Great North of Scotland Railway	1965	
Knockando House Halt	Great North of Scotland Railway	1965	
Knott End-on-Sea	Knott End Railway	1930	
Knotty Ash & Stanley	Cheshire Lines Committee	1960	
Knowesgate	North British Railway	1952	
Knoweside	Glasgow and South Western Railway	1930	
Knowle Halt	London and South Western Railway	1964	
Knowles Level Crossing Halt	Lancashire and Yorkshire Railway	1918	
Knowlton	East Kent Light Railway	1948	
Knowsley Street (Bury)	Lancashire and Yorkshire Railway	1970	
Knutton Halt	North Staffordshire Railway	1926	
Knypersley Halt	North Staffordshire Railway	1927	

== L ==
=== La ===
Station (Town, unless in station name)	Rail company	Year closed	Notes
Lackenby	North Eastern Railway (UK)	1864	
Lacock Halt	GWR	1966	
Lade Halt	Romney, Hythe and Dymchurch Railway	1977	
Ladylands Platform	North British Railway	1934	
Ladysbridge	Great North of Scotland Railway	1964	
Laira	South Devon Railway	1849	
Laira Halt	GWR	1930	
Laisterdyke	GNR	1966	
Lake Halt (Hamworthy)	London and South Western Railway	1927	
Lakeside	Furness Railway	1965	reopened 1973
Lamancha	North British Railway	1933	
Lambley	NER	1976	
Lambourn	GWR	1960	
Lamb's Cottage	Liverpool and Manchester Railway	1842	
Lamesley	NER	1945	
Lamington	Caledonian Railway	1965	
Lampeter	GWR	1965	
Lamplugh	Whitehaven, Cleator and Egremont Railway	1931	
Lamport	L&NWR	1960	
Lanark Racecourse	Caledonian Railway	1964	
Lancaster (Greaves)	Lancaster and Preston Junction Railway	1849	
Lancaster Green Ayre	"Little" North Western Railway	1966	
Lanchester	NER	1939	
Lando Platform	Great Western Railway	1964	
Landore	GWR	1964	
Landore Low Level	GWR	1954	
Lands	NER	1872	
Landywood Halt	L&NWR	1916	reopened 1986
Langford (Somerset)	GWR	1931	
Langford (Wiltshire)	GWR	1857	
Langford and Ulting	Great Eastern Railway	1964	
Langho	Lancashire and Yorkshire Railway	1956	reopened 1994
Langholm	North British Railway	1964	
Langley (Northumberland)	NER	1930	
Langley Mill	Midland Railway	1926	Not to be confused with Langley Mill and Eastwood, reopened as Langley Mill in 1986
Langley Mill & Eastwood	Midland Railway	1967	reopened 1986 as Langley Mill
Langloan	Caledonian Railway	1964	
Langport East	GWR	1962	
Langport West	GWR	1964	
Langrick	GNR	1963	
Langston	London, Brighton and South Coast Railway	1963	
Langton Dock	Liverpool Overhead Railway	1906	
Langwathby	Midland Railway	1970	reopened 1986
Langwith	Midland Railway	1964	
Langwith Colliery	Midland Railway	1945	approximate date
Langworth	Great Central Railway	1965	
Largo	North British Railway	1965	
Larkhall Central	Caledonian Railway	1965	reopened 2005
Larkhall East	Caledonian Railway	1951	
Lartington	NER	1962	
Lasswade	North British Railway	1951	
Lasswade Road	North British Railway	1849	
Latchford	L&NWR	1962	
Latchford & Grappenhall Road	London & North Western Railway	1893	
Latchley	Plymouth, Devonport and South Western Junction Railway	1966	
Lauder	North British Railway	1932	
Launceston North	GWR	1952	
Launceston South	London and South Western Railway	1966	
Launton	L&NWR	1968	
Laurencekirk	Caledonian Railway	1967	reopened 2009
Lauriston	North British Railway	1951	
Lavant	London, Brighton and South Coast Railway	1935	
Lavenham	Great Eastern Railway	1961	
Lavernock	Taff Vale Railway	1968	
Laverton Halt	GWR	1960	
Lavington	GWR	1966	
Law Junction	Caledonian Railway	1965	
Lawley Bank	GWR	1962	
Lawley Street (Birmingham)	Midland Railway	1851	
Lawton	North Staffordshire Railway	1930	
Laxfield	Mid-Suffolk Light Railway	1952	
Lazenby	NER	1864	
Lazonby and Kirkoswald	Midland Railway	1970	reopened 1986

=== Le ===
Station (Town, unless in station name)	Rail company	Year closed	Notes
Lea	Great Northern and Great Eastern Joint Railway	1957	
Lea Bridge	Great Eastern Railway	1985	reopened 2016
Lea Green	LNWR	1955	
Lea Road (Lancashire)	Preston and Wyre Joint Railway	1938	
Leadburn	North British Railway	1955	
Leadenham	GNR	1965	
Leadgate	NER	1955	
Leadhills	Caledonian Railway	1939	
Leamington Spa (Avenue)	L&NWR	1965	
Leamington Spa Milverton	L&NWR	1965	
Leamside	NER	1953	
Leasingthorne	NER	1867	
Leason Hill	Scottish Midland Junction Railway	1847	
Leatherhead	London and South Western Railway	1927	
Leaton	GWR	1960	
Lech-a-Vuie	North British Railway	1945	
Lechlade	GWR	1962	
Ledbury Town Halt	GWR	1959	
Ledsham	Birkenhead Railway	1959	
Ledston	NER	1951	
Leebotwood	Shrewsbury and Hereford Joint Railway	1958	
Leeds Central	GNR/Lancashire and Yorkshire Railway/NER/L&NWR	1967	
Leeds Hunslet Lane	North Midland Railway	1851	
Leeds Marsh Lane	NER	1958	
Leeds (Whitehall)	Railtrack	2002	
Leegate	Maryport and Carlisle Railway	1950	
Leek	North Staffordshire Railway	1965	
Leek Brook Halt	North Staffordshire Railway	1956	
Leeming Bar	NER	1954	
Lees	L&NWR	1955	
Lee-on-the-Solent	London and South Western Railway	1931	
Legacy	GWR	1931	
Legbourne Road	GNR	1953	
Leicester Belgrave Road	GNR	1953	special services ran until 1962
Leicester Central	Great Central Railway	1969	
Leicester Welford Road	Midland Railway	1918	
Leicester West Bridge	MR	1928	
Leigh (Lancashire)	L&NWR	1969	
Leigh (Staffordshire)	North Staffordshire Railway	1966	
Leigh Court	GWR	1964	
Leire Halt	LM&SR	1962	
Leiston	Great Eastern Railway	1966	
Leith Central	North British Railway	1952	
Leith Citadel	North British Railway	1947	
Leith North	Caledonian Railway	1962	
Leith Walk	North British Railway	1930	
Leman Street	Great Eastern Railway	1941	
Lemington	NER	1958	
Lemsford Road Halt	LNER	1951	
Lennoxtown	North British Railway	1951	
Lennoxtown Old	North British Railway	1881	
Lenton	Midland Railway	1911	
Lentran	Highland Railway	1960	
Lenwade	Midland and Great Northern Joint Railway	1959	
Lesbury	York, Newcastle and Berwick Railway	1850	
Leslie	North British Railway	1932	
Lesmahagow	Caledonian Railway	1965	
Letham Grange	North British Railway	1930	
Lethenty	Great North of Scotland Railway	1931	
Letterston	GWR	1937	
Leuchars (Old)	North British Railway	1921	
Leven (Fife)	NBR	1969	New station opened 2024
Levenshulme South	Great Central Railway	1958	
Leverton	Great Central Railway	1959	
Lewes Road	London, Brighton and South Coast Railway	1933	
Lewiefield Halt	L&NER	1956	
Lewisham Road	London, Chatham and Dover Railway	1917	
Lewistown Halt	GWR	1951	
Lewknor Bridge Halt	GWR	1957	
Leyburn	NER	1954	
Leycett	North Staffordshire Railway	1931	
Leysdown	Sheppey Light Railway	1950	
Leysmill	Caledonian	1955	

=== Lh - Li ===
Station (Town, unless in station name)	Rail company	Year closed	Notes
Lhanbryde	Highland Railway	1964	
Lichfield Trent Valley Junction	South Staffordshire Railway	1871	
Liddaton Halt	GWR	1962	
Liff	Caledonian Railway / Dundee and Newtyle Railway	1955	
Lifford	Midland Railway	1941	
Lifton	GWR	1962	
Lightcliffe	Lancashire and Yorkshire Railway	1965	
Lightmoor	GWR	1864	
Lightmoor Platform	GWR	1962	
Lilbourne	L&NWR	1966	
Limehouse	London and Blackwall Railway	1926	
Limpet Mill	Aberdeen Railway	1850	
Limpley Stoke	GWR	1966	
Linacre Road	Lancashire and Yorkshire Railway	1951	
Linby	GNR	1916	
Linby	Midland Railway	1964	
Lincoln St. Marks	Midland Railway	1985	
Lindal	Furness Railway	1951	
Lindean	North British Railway	1951	
Lindores (1st)	North British Railway	1847	
Lindores (2nd)	North British Railway	1951	
Linefoot	Cockermouth and Workington Railway	1908	
Linksfield Level Crossing	Great North of Scotland Railway	1859	
Linley Halt	GWR	1963	
Lintmill Halt	Campbeltown and Machrihanish Light Railway	1932	
Linton	GER	1967	
Lintz Green	NER	1953	
Lipson Vale Halt	GWR	1942	
Liscard and Poulton	Wirral Railway	1960	
Litchfield	GWR	1960	
Little Bytham	Edenham and Little Bytham Railway	1871	
Little Bytham	GNR	1959	
Little Drayton Halt	GWR	1941	
Little Eaton	Midland Railway	1930	
Little Hulton	L&NWR	1954	
Little Mill (Northumberland)	NER	1958	
Little Mill Junction	Coleford, Monmouth, Usk and Pontypool Railway	1955	
Little Ormesby Halt	Midland and Great Northern Joint Railway	1933	
Little Salkeld	Midland Railway	1970	
Little Somerford	GWR	1961	
Little Steeping	GNR	1961	
Little Stretton Halt	Shrewsbury and Hereford Railway	1958	
Little Weighton	Hull and Barnsley Railway	1955	
Littleham	London and South Western Railway	1967	
Littlemore	GWR	1963	
Littleton and Badsey	GWR	1966	
Littleworth	GNR	1961	
Liverpool Central High Level	Cheshire Lines Committee	1972	
Liverpool Crown Street	Liverpool and Manchester Railway	1836	
Liverpool Exchange	Lancashire and Yorkshire Railway	1977	
Liverpool Great Howard Street	Lancashire and Yorkshire Railway	1851	
Liverpool Riverside	Mersey Docks and Harbour Board	1971	
Liverpool Road (Chester)	Great Central Railway	1951	
Liverpool Road (Kidsgrove)	North Staffordshire Rly	1964	
Liverpool Road (Manchester)	Liverpool and Manchester Railway	1844	
Liverpool Road Halt (Newcastle-under-Lyme)	North Staffordshire Rly	1964	
Liverpool St James	Cheshire Lines Committee	1917	
Liversedge	Lancashire and Yorkshire Railway	1965	
Liversedge Spen	L&NWR	1953	
Livingston	North British Railway	1948	

=== Ll ===
Station (Town, unless in station name)	Rail company	Year closed	Notes
Llafar Halt	GWR	1960	
Llanarthney Halt	L&NWR	1963	
Llanbedrgoch	L&NWR	1930	
Llanberis	L&NWR	1930	summer specials continued until 1962
Llanbethery Platform	Taff Vale Railway	1920	
Llanbrynmair	Cambrian Railways	1965	
Llancaiach	Great Western Railway	1912	
Llandarcy Platform	GWR	1947	
Llandderfel	GWR	1964	
Llandenny	GWR	1955	
Llandilo Bridge	L&NWR	1963	
Llandinam	Cambrian Railways	1962	
Llandogo Halt	GWR	1959	
Llandough Platform	Taff Vale Railway	1918	
Llandow Halt	Barry Railway	1964	
Llandow (Wick Road) Halt	GWR	1964	
Llandre	Cambrian Railways	1965	
Llandrillo	GWR	1964	
Llandrinio Road	Potteries, Shrewsbury & North Wales Railway	1932	
Llandulas	L&NWR	1952	
Llandyssul	GWR	1952	
Llanelly Dock	GWR	1879	
Llanerch-Ayron Halt	GWR	1951	
Llanerchymedd	L&NWR	1964	
Llanfabon Road Halt	Taff Vale Railway	1932	
Llanfalteg Halt	GWR	1962	
Llanfaredd Halt	GWR	1962	
Llanfechain	Cambrian Railways	1965	
Llanfyllin	Cambrian Railways	1965	
Llanfynydd	Wrexham and Minera Joint Railway	1950	
Llanfyrnach	GWR	1962	
Llangedwyn Halt	Cambrian Railways	1951	
Llangefni	L&NWR	1964	
Llangeinor	GWR	1953	
Llangelynin	Great Western Railway	1991	
Llanglydwen	GWR	1962	
Llangollen	GWR	1965	reopened by Llangollen Rly Society
Llangollen Road	GWR	1862	
Llangorse Lake Halt	GWR	1962	
Llangower	GWR	1964	
Llangwyllog	L&NWR	1964	
Llangybi (Cardiganshire)	GWR	1965	
Llangybi (Caernarfonshire)	L&NWR	1964	
Llangyfelach	GWR	1924	
Llangynog	Cambrian Railways	1951	
Llangynwyd	GWR	1970	
Llanharan	GWR	1964	reopened 2007
Llanharry	Taff Vale Railway	1951	
Llanhilleth	GWR	1962	reopened 2008
Llanidloes	Cambrian Railways	1962	
Llanilar	GWR	1964	
Llanion Halt	GWR	1908	
Llanmorlais	L&NWR	1931	
Llanpumpsaint	GWR	1965	
Llanrhaiadr	L&NWR	1953	
Llanrhaiadr Mochnant	Cambrian Railways	1951	
Llanrhystyd Road	GWR	1964	
Llansamlet North (1st)	GWR	1875	
Llansamlet North (2nd)	GWR	1964	
Llansamlet (Midland)	Midland Railway	1875	
Llansantffraid	Cambrian Railways	1965	
Llansilin Road	Cambrian Railways	1951	
Llanstephan Halt	GWR	1962	
Llantarnam	Monmouthshire Railway and Canal Company	1890	
Llantarnam (1st)	GWR	1880	
Llantarnam (2nd)	GWR	1962	
Llantrisant	GWR	1964	reopened 1992 as Pontyclun
Llantwit Fardre	Taff Vale Railway	1952	
Llantwit Major	Barry Railway	1964	reopened 2005
Llanuwchllyn	Great Western Railway	1965	reopened 1972 by Bala Lake Railway
Llanvair	Newport, Abergavenny and Hereford Railway	1854	
Llanvihangel	GWR	1958	
Llanwern	GWR	1960	
Llanwnda	Nantlle Railway/L&NWR	1964	
Llanyblodwell	Cambrian Railways	1951	
Llanybyther	GWR	1965	
Llanycefn	Narberth Road and Maenclochog Railway	1937	
Llanymynech	Cambrian Railways	1965	
Llanymynech	Potteries, Shrewsbury & North Wales Railway	1933	
Lletty Brongu	Port Talbot Railway and Docks	1932	
Lliwdy	Corris Railway	1931	
Llong	L&NWR	1962	
Llwydcoed	GWR	1962	
Llwyngwern	Corris Railway	1931	
Llyn Ystradau	Ffestiniog Railway	1978	
Llynclys	Cambrian Railways	1965	
Llys Halt	GWR	1965	
Llysfaen	L&NWR	1931	

=== Lo ===
Station (Town, unless in station name)	Rail company	Year closed	Notes
Loanhead	North British Railway	1933	
Loch Leven	North British Railway	1921	
Loch Skerrow Halt	Portpatrick and Wigtownshire Joint Railway	1965	
Loch Tay	Killin Railway	1939	
Lochanhead	Glasgow and South Western Railway	1939	
Locharbriggs	Caledonian Railway	1952	
Lochburn	North British Railway	1917	
Lochearnhead	Comrie, St Fillans & Lochearnhead Railway	1951	
Lochee	Caledonian Railway	1955	
Lochee West	Caledonian Railway	1917	
Lochmaben	Caledonian Railway	1952	
Lochwinnoch	Glasgow & South Western Railway	1966	
Locking Road (Weston-Super-Mare)	GWR	1964	
Lockington	NER	1960	
Loddiswell Halt	GWR	1963	
Lodge Hill	GWR	1963	
Lofthouse and Outwood	Great Northern Railway	1960	
Lofthouse and Outwood	Methley Joint Railway	1958	
Lofthouse-in-Nidderdale	Nidd Valley Light Railway	1930	
Loftus	Whitby Redcar and Middlesbrough Union Railway	1960	
Logierieve	Great North of Scotland Railway	1965	
Login Halt	GWR	1962	
Londesborough	York and North Midland Railway	1965	
Londesborough Park	York and North Midland Railway	1867	
Londesborough Road (Scarborough)	NER	1963	
London (Bishopsgate)	Eastern Counties Railway	1875	
London (Bricklayers' Arms)	South Eastern Railway	1852	
London (Broad Street)	North London Railway	1986	
London (Holborn Viaduct)	London, Chatham and Dover Railway	1990	
London Necropolis	L&SWR	1941	
London Road (Bridgeton, Glasgow)	Caledonian Railway	1895	
London Road (Carlisle)	NER	1864	
London (Waterloo International)	British Railways	2007	
Long Ashton	GWR	1941	
Long Clawson and Hose	Great Northern and London and North Western Joint Railway	1953	
Long Eaton	Midland Railway	1967	see also Long Eaton, previously Sawley Junction
Long Eaton Junction	Midland Railway	1862	
Long Lane	Midland Railway	1848	
Long Marston	GWR	1966	
Long Marton	Midland Railway	1970	
Long Melford	Great Eastern Railway	1967	
Long Stanton	Great Eastern Railway	1970	
Long Sutton	Midland and Great Northern Joint Railway	1959	
Long Sutton & Pitney	GWR	1962	
Longbridge	Halesowen Railway	1960	
Longdon Halt	GWR	1963	
Longdon Road	GWR	1929	
Longdown	GWR	1958	
Longfield Halt	South Eastern and Chatham Railway	1953	
Longford and Exhall	L&NWR	1949	
Longforgan	Caledonian Railway	1956	
Longhaven	Great North of Scotland Railway	1932	
Longhirst	NER	1951	
Longhope	GWR	1964	
Longhoughton	NER	1962	
Longmorn	Great North of Scotland Railway	1968	
Longparish	LSWR	1931	
Longridge (Lancashire)	Preston and Longridge Railway	1930	
Longridge (West Lothian)	Wilsontown, Morningside and Coltness Railway	1852	
Longriggend	North British Railway	1930	
Longside	Great North of Scotland Railway	1965	
Longsight	L&NWR	1958	
Longton Bridge	Lancashire and Yorkshire Railway	1964	
Longtown	North British Railway	1969	
Longville	GWR	1951	
Longwitton	North British Railway	1952	
Longwood and Milnsbridge	L&NWR	1968	
Lonmay	Great North of Scotland Railway	1965	
Lord's	Metropolitan Railway	1939	
Lord's Bridge	L&NWR	1968	
Lordship Lane	London, Chatham and Dover Railway	1954	
Lossiemouth	Great North of Scotland Railway	1964	
Lostock Junction	Lancashire and Yorkshire Railway	1966	reopened 1988 as Lostock Parkway
Lostock Lane	Lancashire and Yorkshire Railway	1879	
Loth	Highland Railway	1960	
Lothian Road	Caledonian Railway	1870	
Loudounhill	Glasgow and South Western Railway	1939	
Loudwater	GWR	1970	
Loughborough Central	Great Central Railway	1969	reopened by GC Railway Society
Loughborough Derby Road	L&NWR	1931	
Loughor	GWR	1960	
Louth	GNR	1970	
Lovers' Lane Halt	Bideford, Westward Ho! and Appledore Railway	1917	
Lovesgrove Halt	Vale of Rheidol Railway	1918	
Low Bentham	"Little" North Western Railway	1853	
Low Fell	NER	1952	
Low Gill (1st)	L&NWR	1861	
Low Gill (2nd)	L&NWR	1960	
Low Marishes	York and North Midland Railway	1847	
Low Moor	Lancashire and Yorkshire Railway	1965	re-opened 2017
Low Row	NER	1959	
Low Row	Maryport and Carlisle Railway	1845	
Low Street	London, Tilbury & Southend Railway	1967	
Lowca	Cleator & Workington Junction Railway	1926	
Lower Darwen	Lancashire and Yorkshire Railway	1958	
Lower Edmonton (Low Level)	GER	1939	
Lower Ince	Great Central Railway	1964	
Lower Lydbrook	Severn and Wye Railway	1903	
Lower Penarth	Taff Vale Railway	1954	
Lower Pontnewydd	GWR	1958	
Lowesby	Great Northern Railway	1953	
Lowestoft North	Norfolk and Suffolk Joint Railway	1970	
Lowthorpe	NER	1970	
Lowton	North Union Railway	1949	
Lowton St Mary's	Great Central Railway	1964	

=== Lu ===
Station (Town, unless in station name)	Rail company	Year closed
Lubenham	L&NWR	1966
Lucas Terrace Halt (Plymouth)	L&SWR	1951
Lucker	NER	1953
Luckett	Plymouth, Devonport and South Western Junction Railway	1966
Ludborough	GNR	1961
Luddendenfoot	Lancashire and Yorkshire Railway	1962
Luddington	Isle of Axholme Joint Railway	1933
Ludgate Hill	London, Chatham and Dover Railway	1929
Ludgershall	Midland and South Western Junction Railway	1961
Luffenham	Midland Railway	1966
Luffness Platform/Golf Club Halt	North British Railway	1932
Lugar	Glasgow and South Western Railway	1950
Lugton	Glasgow, Barrhead and Kilmarnock Joint Railway	1966
Lugton High	Lanarkshire and Ayrshire Railway	1932
Luib	Callander and Oban Railway	1965
Lumphanan	Great North of Scotland Railway	1966
Lunan Bay	North British Railway	1930
Luncarty	Caledonian Railway	1951
Lundin Links	North British Railway	1965
Lustleigh	GWR	1959
Luthrie	North British Railway	1951
Luton Bute Street	GNR	1965
Luton Hoo	GNR	1965
Lutterworth	Great Central Railway	1969
Luxborough Road	West Somerset Mineral Railway	1898

=== Ly ===
Station (Town, unless in station name)	Rail company	Year closed
Lybster	Wick and Lybster Railway	1944
Lydbrook Junction	GWR	1959
Lydd Town	SER	1967
Lydd-on-Sea Halt	SR	1967
Lydford	GWR	1962
Lydford	London and South Western Railway	1968
Lydham Heath	Bishop's Castle Railway	1935
Lydiate	Cheshire Lines Committee	1952
Lydney Junction	Severn and Wye Railway	1879; 1960 re-opened 1995 Dean Forest Railway
Lydney Town	Severn and Wye Railway	1960 re-opened 1991 Dean Forest Railway
Lydstep Halt	GWR	1956
Lyme Regis	London and South Western Railway	1965
Lyminge	South Eastern Railway (UK)	1947
Lyminster Halt	London, Brighton and South Coast Railway	1914
Lymm	L&NWR	1962
Lyne	Caledonian Railway	1950
Lynedoch (Greenock)	Glasgow and South Western Railway	1959
Lyneside	North British Railway	1929
Lyng Halt	GWR	1964
Lynton and Lynmouth	Lynton & Barnstaple Railway	1935
Lyonshall	GWR	1940
Lytham Junction	Preston and Wyre Joint Railway	1853
Lytham (Station Road)	Preston and Wyre Joint Railway	1874

== See also ==
- List of closed railway stations in London
