= Kingennie railway station =

Disused railway station in Kingennie, Angus

Kingennie

General information
- Location: Kingennie, Angus; Scotland
- Coordinates: 56.5009°N 2.8535°W
- Grid reference: NO475346
- Platforms: 2

Other information
- Status: Disused

History
- Original company: Caledonian Railway
- Pre-grouping: Caledonian Railway
- Post-grouping: London, Midland and Scottish Railway

Key dates
- 14 November 1870: Opened
- 10 January 1955: Closed
Location

Kingennie railway station served the village of Kingennie, Angus, Scotland, from 1870 to 1955 on the Dundee and Forfar direct line.

== History ==
The station was opened on 14 November 1870 by the Caledonian Railway. On the northbound platform was the station building, on the east side was the goods yard and on the southbound platform was the signal box. It originally had a siding to the north of the crossing. The station closed on 10 January 1955.

Preceding station	Disused railways	Following station
Barnhill; Line and station closed	Caledonian Railway; Dundee and Forfar direct line	Gagie; Line and station closed
