= Kingsmuir railway station =

Disused railway station in Kingsmuir, Angus

Kingsmuir

General information
- Location: Kingsmuir, Angus; Scotland
- Coordinates: 56.6255°N 2.8406°W
- Grid reference: NO485485
- Platforms: 1

Other information
- Status: Disused

History
- Original company: Caledonian Railway
- Pre-grouping: Caledonian Railway
- Post-grouping: London, Midland and Scottish Railway

Key dates
- 14 November 1870: Opened
- 10 January 1955: Closed
Location

Kingsmuir railway station served the village of Kingsmuir, Angus, Scotland, from 1870 to 1955 on the Dundee and Forfar direct line.

== History ==
The station was opened on 14 November 1870 by the Caledonian Railway. To the south was the goods yard. It had a siding on the east side of the line and a signal box, which closed in 1932. The station closed on 10 January 1955.

Preceding station	Disused railways	Following station
Kirkbuddo; Line and station closed	Caledonian Railway; Dundee and Forfar direct line	Terminus
