= Marsh Road =

Marsh Road may refer to:

- Marsh Road Level Crossing electric railway station, a closed railway station in Stallingborough, North East Lincolnshire in England
- Marsh Road, a road connected to Delaware Route 3 in New Castle County, Delaware in the United States
- Marsh Road, a road in Wan Chai, Hong Kong Island, named after William Henry Marsh

== See also ==
- The House in Marsh Road, a 1960 thriller film
