= Somerton railway station =

Former railway station in England

Somerton (Somerset)
- Somerton Station c. 1906

General information
- Location: Somerton, Somerset; England
- Coordinates: 51.052956°N 2.733324°W
- Grid reference: ST487284
- Platforms: 2

Other information
- Status: Unused

History
- Pre-grouping: Great Western Railway
- Post-grouping: Great Western Railway

Key dates
- 2 July 1906: Opened as Somerton (Somerset)
- 10 September 1962: closed for passengers
- 6 July 1964: Closed for freight
Location

Somerton railway station (not to be confused with Fritwell & Somerton) was a railway station situated on the Langport and Castle Cary Railway of the Great Western Railway. It served the town of Somerton in Somerset, England.

== History ==
Somerton station opened to the public on 2 July 1906, in a cutting adjoining the town centre. The station had two signal boxes and a goods shed, however none of these are still standing. The station stopped handling passenger services on 10 September 1962 but continued to serve freight traffic until closing altogether on 6 July 1964. Despite all the stations between Castle Cary and Taunton being closed, the line remained open for trains from London Paddington station to stations such as Paignton, Plymouth and Penzance.

In recent times there have been various aspirations to re-open the station by local people, including former local MP David Heath - but until that may happen, the only real sign of the station today is a 350-metre (1,150 ft)-long siding which had been built originally to let goods trains be overtaken. This siding is still used occasionally by Network Rail during night-time engineering works.

== Description ==
The station lay just behind the West Street girder bridge and ran all the way down to the Perry Hill area of the town. The main building was sited on the eastbound platform, with the goods shed at the west end of that platform. The original signal box was placed just opposite this platform, but a second signal box was opened in 1942 to control and monitor some new loop lines and sidings which created to the west of the station itself.

Various local businesses used the station as a site for their companies, with a cattle market, an animal and corn feed mill, a coal yard and even a fish merchant all having stood on the site.

=== The site today ===
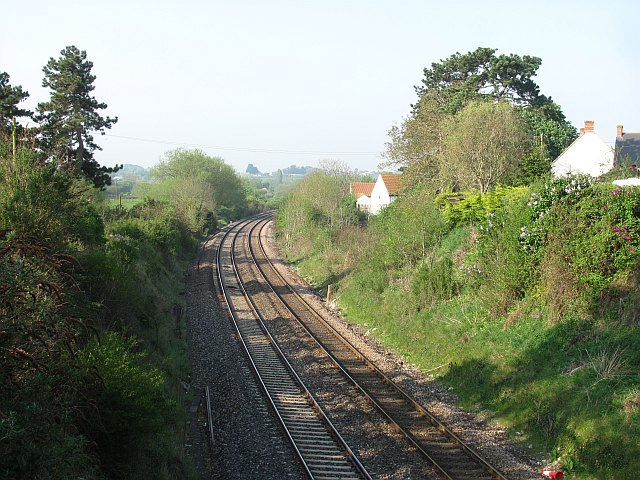
The site of the station today

Up until the mid-1980s when the original signal box was demolished, a few station huts still stood on the site, but these have all ceased to exist.

== Proposed reopening ==
A May 2018 transport strategy suggested that a station should be opened to serve the Somerton and Langport area, and such a plan was again mentioned in the National Infrastructure Strategy in November 2020.

== Services ==
Preceding station	Historical railways	Following station
Long Sutton and Pitney	Langport and Castle Cary Railway (Great Western Railway)	Charlton Mackrell
