= Immingham railway station =

Immingham railway station may refer to:

- Immingham Dock railway station
- Immingham Dock electric railway station
- Immingham (Eastern Jetty) railway station
- Immingham Town electric railway station
- Immingham (Queens Road) electric railway station
