= Kirriemuir Junction railway station =

Short-lived railway station in Kirriemuir, Angus

Coordinates: 56.6456°N 2.9546°W

Kirriemuir Junction

General information
- Location: Kirriemuir, Angus; Scotland
- Platforms: 2

Other information
- Status: Disused

History
- Original company: Scottish Midland Junction Railway
- Pre-grouping: Scottish Midland Junction Railway

Key dates
- January 1855: Opened
- June 1864: Closed
Location

Kirriemuir Junction railway station served the burgh of Kirriemuir, Angus, Scotland from 1855 to 1864 on the Scottish Midland Junction Railway.

== History ==
The station opened in January 1855 by the Scottish Midland Junction Railway. To the south was a siding and south of the junction was the signal box. The only means of accessing the station was by getting off the train. It was last in the timetable in June 1864. Following the closure of this station, Kirriemuir continued to be served by the much closer Kirriemuir railway station.

Preceding station	Disused railways	Following station
Forfar; Line and station closed	Scottish Midland Junction Railway	Kirriemuir; Line and station closed
