= Pont Lliw railway station =

Short-lived railway station in Pontlliw, Swansea

Pont Lliw

General information
- Location: Pontlliw, Glamorganshire; Wales
- Coordinates: 51.6907°N 4.0145°W
- Grid reference: SN597009
- Platforms: 2

Other information
- Status: Disused

History
- Original company: Great Western Railway

Key dates
- 9 July 1923: Opened
- 22 September 1924: Closed
Location

Pont Lliw railway station served the village of Pontlliw, in the historical county of Glamorganshire, Wales, from 1923 to 1924 on the Swansea District Line.

== History ==
The station was opened on 9 July 1923 by the Great Western Railway. It was a short-lived station, closing a year later on 22 September 1924. It was later used in 1945 for entertaining troops.

Preceding station	Disused railways	Following station
Llangyfelach; Line open, station closed	Great Western Railway; Swansea District Line	Llangennech; Line and station open
