= Kingennie =

Coordinates: 56.505988°N 2.844800°W

- Location within Angus Location near the Dundee City council area
- OS grid reference: NO481352
- Council area: Angus
- Lieutenancy area: Angus
- Country: Scotland
- Sovereign state: United Kingdom
- Post town: DUNDEE
- Postcode district: DD5
- Dialling code: 01382
- Police: Scotland
- Fire: Scottish
- Ambulance: Scottish
- UK Parliament: Dundee East
- Scottish Parliament: Angus South

Kingennie is a village in Angus, Scotland, two miles north of Monifieth. It is mostly known for the Forbes Of Kingennie holiday and golf resort.

The village lies on the B961 road.

There once was a railway station at Kingennie, which closed to passengers in 1955.

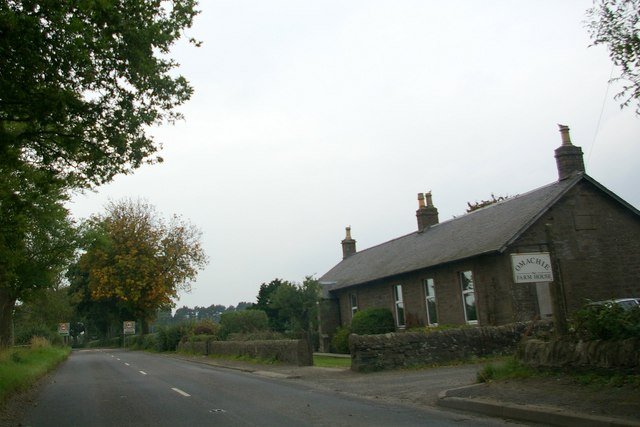
Entering Kingennie near Omachie farm
