= Charlton Mackrell railway station =

Former railway station in England

Charlton Mackrell
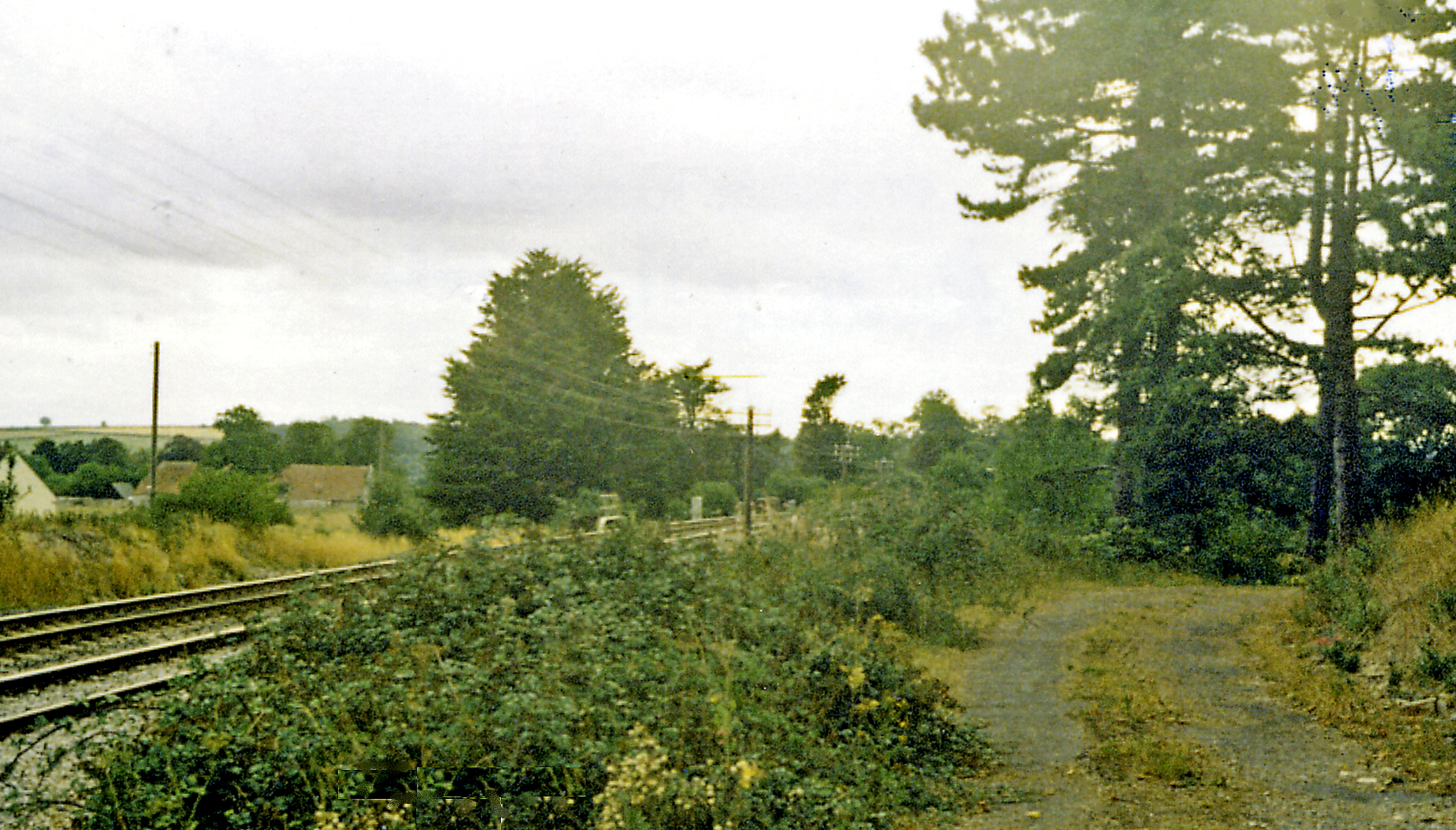
- Location of the station (1984)

General information
- Location: Charlton Mackrell, Somerset; England
- Coordinates: 51.0557°N 2.6734°W
- Grid reference: ST532289
- Platforms: 2

Other information
- Status: Disused

History
- Pre-grouping: Great Western Railway
- Post-grouping: Great Western Railway

Key dates
- 1 July 1905: Opened
- 10 September 1962: Closed
Location

Charlton Mackrell railway station was a minor railway station serving the village of Charlton Mackrell in Somerset, England, from 1905 until 1962.

== History ==
The station was on the Langport and Castle Cary Railway of the Great Western Railway, and was a temporary terminus station for the railway (serving trains from Castle Cary) before it was finished in 1906.

The station master's house is still in use as private property.

Though the station closed along with the rest of the stops between Castle Cary and Cogload Junction in 1962, the line itself is still in use as part of the Reading to Taunton line.

== Services ==
Preceding station	Historical railways	Following station
Somerton	Langport and Castle Cary Railway (Great Western Railway)	Keinton Mandeville
