= Pentrefelin Halt railway station =

Disused railway station in Wales

Coordinates: 51.6709°N 3.9189°W

Pentrefelin Halt

General information
- Location: Wales

Other information
- Status: Disused

History
- Original company: Great Western Railway
- Post-grouping: Great Western Railway

Key dates
- 16 April 1928: Station opened
- 11 June 1956: Station closed
Location

Pentrefelin Halt railway station was a station on the Swansea District line in Wales. It opened on 16 April 1928, and closed on 11 June 1956.

Preceding station	Disused railways	Following station
Morriston West; Line and station closed	Great Western Railway; Morriston Branch	Felin Fran Halt; Line and station closed
