= Irving House, Keinton Mandeville =

House and birthplace of Henry Irving

Irving House
- Photograph published in Percy Hetherington Fitzgerald's biography of Irving, issued the year after his death. Irving House is on the right of the image.

- Location in Somerset
- 51.0762°N 2.6418°W

Listed Building – Grade II
- Designated: 17 April 1959
- Reference no.: 1176821

Irving House, on Castle Street in the village of Keinton Mandeville, in Somerset, England, was the birthplace of Henry Irving, (1838–1905), among the most prominent of the actor-managers of the Victorian era. The house forms part of a terrace on the north side of the street and is a Grade II listed building. It bears two plaques commemorating Irving's birth.

== History and description ==
Sir Henry Irving was born John Henry Brodribb at Irving House on 6 February 1838. He was born into poverty; Irving's entry in the Oxford Dictionary of National Biography describes his father, Samuel, as "unsuccessful in a number of occupations". He remained in the village of Keinton Mandeville until the age of four, when his parents moved to London and he was sent to live with an aunt in Cornwall. His determination to become an actor was formed at an early age and, while it caused a permanent breach with his Methodist mother, saw him become one of the most famous actor-managers of his day. He received a knighthood in 1895, the first actor ever to be so honoured, and on his death in 1905, his ashes were interred in Westminster Abbey. Irving returned to Keinton Mandeville only once in his life, later recalling, "I was shown a stone edifice supposed to be my old home...The place was quite unfamiliar to me".

Julian Orbach, in his Somerset: South and West volume in the Pevsner Buildings of England series, revised and reissued in 2014, describes Keinton Mandeville as "a village of Blue Lias stone", and it is this local building stone which was used in the construction of Irving House. The roof is of Welsh slate and a small degree of decoration is provided by ashlar dressings - the Victoria County History for Somerset considered the building's style to be "severely plain". It forms part of a row of similar buildings, constructed in the early 19th century. The building's frontage bears two plaques commemorating Irving's birth: the first was unveiled in 1925 by John Martin-Harvey, a long-time collaborator of Irving's; (Note: At the time of the 1925 unveiling, the local newspaper, The Taunton Courier, reported, "In many quarters it has been felt that the absence of such a memorial was almost a reproach to his native shire [and the plaque] can only be regarded as the discharge of a debt that is long overdue".) the second, a Blue plaque, in 2011 by the actor Richard Briers. Irving House is a Grade II listed building.

== Sources ==
- Davies, Robertson (2008). Sir Henry Irving (real name John Henry Brodribb). Oxford Dictionary of National Biography. Oxford: Oxford University Press.
- Orbach, Julian; Pevsner, Nikolaus (2014). Somerset: South and West. Pevsner Buildings of England. New Haven, US and London: Yale University Press.
- Siraut, Mary, ed. (2010). Keinton Mandeville. Victoria County History. Woodbridge, Suffolk: British History Online.
- Winetrobe, Barry K.; Seaton, Janet (2021). "Henry Irving: All Somerset's a stage". The Somerset Leveller. Wincanton, Somerset.
