= Lazenby =

Village in North Yorkshire, England

Coordinates: 54.56951°N 1.11716°W

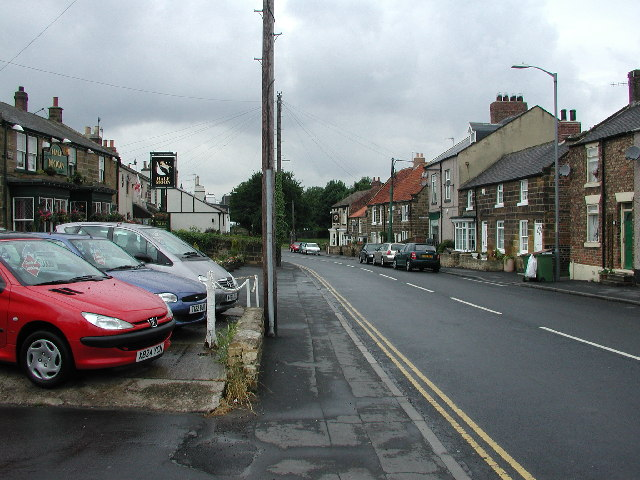
- The High Street in Lazenby

- Location within North Yorkshire
- OS grid reference: NZ571197
- Unitary authority: Redcar and Cleveland
- Ceremonial county: North Yorkshire
- Region: North East
- Country: England
- Sovereign state: United Kingdom
- Post town: Middlesbrough
- Postcode district: TS6
- Dialling code: 01642
- Police: Cleveland
- Fire: Cleveland
- Ambulance: North East
- UK Parliament: Redcar

Lazenby is a village in the unitary authority of Redcar and Cleveland and the ceremonial county of North Yorkshire, England. It is located just off the A174, a 2-minute drive away from Eston. Lazenby is very small, and has just one general store, one pub and a social club.

== History ==
Lazenby was named in the Domesday Book of 1086, depicted as an ancient village of Viking origins. During the reign of William the Conqueror the land was rented at one sovereign per year. In the Domesday book Lazenby was pronounced Leisinchbi. William De Percy, who owned land at Whitby Abbey, ploughed fields around the area, having been granted sole rites by the King at the time. The inhabitants mainly worked the land of the Lord of the Manor of Wilton. This did not alter for over 750 years until ironstone was found in the Eston Hills and people from out of the area came to settle in the village. The natives of the village realised that more could be earned in the mines and so abandoned agriculture and went to work in the mines.

More recently used as location for outdoor scenes during the filming of BBC drama 'Lark Rise to Candleford'.

In 1841 there were 57 people living in Lazenby, but by 1881 this had risen to 501. In 1867, a school was built by the Lowther family who owned Wilton Castle and affiliated to the Church of England. This remained the school until it was handed over to the village trustees in 1961, after which it became the village hall, as it is today.

From 1841 until 1871, Lazenby had a railway station on the Middlesbrough to Redcar line.
