= Kirkbuddo railway station =

Disused railway station in Kirkbuddo, Angus

Kirkbuddo
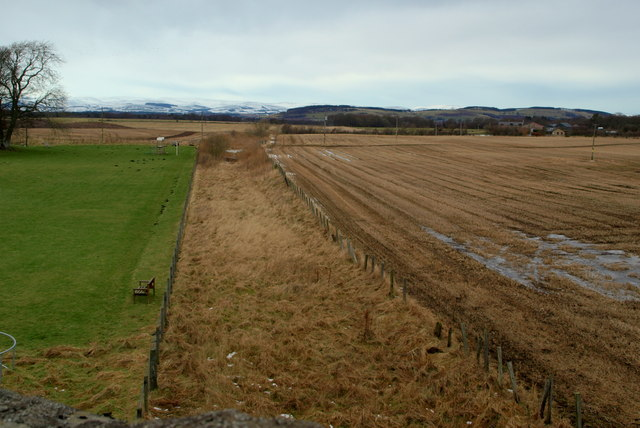
- The site of the station in 2009

General information
- Location: Kirkbuddo, Angus; Scotland
- Coordinates: 56.5821°N 2.8197°W
- Grid reference: NO497436
- Platforms: 2

Other information
- Status: Disused

History
- Original company: Caledonian Railway
- Pre-grouping: Caledonian Railway
- Post-grouping: London, Midland and Scottish Railway

Key dates
- 14 November 1870: Opened
- 10 January 1955: Closed
Location

Kirkbuddo railway station served the village of Kirkbuddo, Angus, Scotland, from 1870 to 1955 on the Dundee and Forfar direct line.

== History ==
The station was opened on 14 November 1870 by the Caledonian Railway. On the northbound platform was the goods yard, on the west side of the line was the goods yard and at the north end of the northbound platform was the signal box, which opened in 1892. When the footbridge was moved to the south, the waiting room on the northbound platform was enlarged. The station closed on 10 January 1955.

| Preceding station | Disused railways | Following station |
|---|---|---|
| Monikie; Line and station closed | Caledonian Railway; Dundee and Forfar direct line | Kingsmuir; Line and station closed |
