= Haggerleases railway station =

Short-lived railway station in Butterknowle, County Durham

Haggerleases

General information
- Location: Butterknowle, County Durham; England
- Coordinates: 54.6232°N 1.8247°W
- Grid reference: NZ114253

Other information
- Status: Disused

History
- Original company: Stockton and Darlington Railway
- Pre-grouping: Stockton and Darlington Railway

Key dates
- April 1859: Opened
- August 1859: Closed
Location

Haggerleases railway station, also known as Butterknowle railway station, served the village of Butterknowle, County Durham, England, in 1859 on the Haggerleases Branch.

== History ==
The station was opened in April 1859 by the Stockton and Darlington Railway, although there is evidence of it being used earlier by horse-drawn coaches. This ended in 1847. It was served by one train per day in May 1859 but this was increased to two trains per day in June. It was a very short-lived station, closing in August 1859.

Preceding station	Disused railways	Following station
Lands; Line and station closed	Stockton and Darlington Railway; Haggerleases Branch	Terminus
