= Morriston West railway station =

Disused railway station in Morriston, Swansea

Morriston West
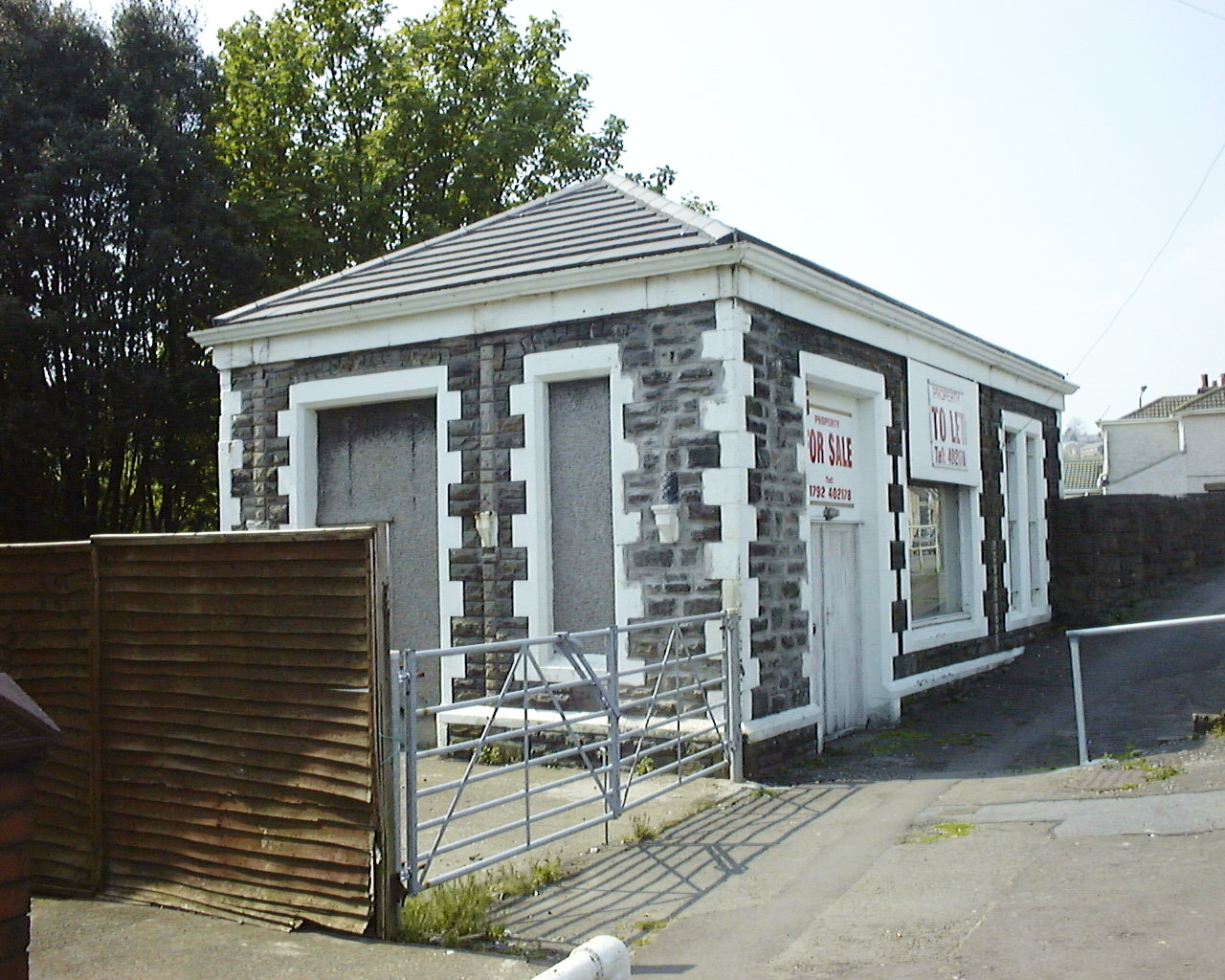
- The site of the station in 1998

General information
- Location: Morriston, Swansea; Wales
- Coordinates: 51.6638°N 3.92°W
- Grid reference: SS673978
- Platforms: 2

Other information
- Status: Disused

History
- Original company: Great Western Railway
- Post-grouping: Western Region of British Railways

Key dates
- 9 May 1881: Opened as Morriston
- January 1950: Name changed to Morriston West
- 11 June 1956: Closed to passengers
- 4 October 1965: Closed completely
Location

Morriston railway station served the community of Morriston, Swansea, Wales from 1881 to 1965 on the Morriston Branch.

== History ==
The station opened on 9 May 1881 by the Great Western Railway. The station was situated south of Clase Road on the A48. The station's name was changed to Morriston West in January 1950 to avoid confusion with another Morriston station. The station closed to passengers on 11 June 1956 and completely on 4 October 1965. No trace of the station remains and the site is lost under the A4067 Neath Road.

Preceding station	Disused railways	Following station
Copper Pit Platform; Line and station closed	Great Western Railway; Morriston Branch	Pentrefelin Halt; Line and station closed
