= Barnhill, Dundee =

Area of Dundee, Scotland

Coordinates: 56.475369°N 2.855483°W

Barnhill: Scottish Gaelic: Cnoc an t-Sabhail; Scots: Barnhull
- Location within the Dundee City council area Location within Scotland
- Population: 4,384
- OS grid reference: NO474318
- Lieutenancy area: Dundee
- Country: Scotland
- Sovereign state: United Kingdom
- Post town: DUNDEE
- Postcode district: DD5
- Dialling code: 01382
- Police: Scotland
- Fire: Scottish
- Ambulance: Scottish
- UK Parliament: Dundee East
- Scottish Parliament: Dundee City East

Barnhill is an area in Dundee, located within the suburb of Broughty Ferry. It is approximately 4 1/2 miles (7 kilometres) east of Dundee City Centre. Until the late 19th century, Barnhill was a separate village.

== Description ==
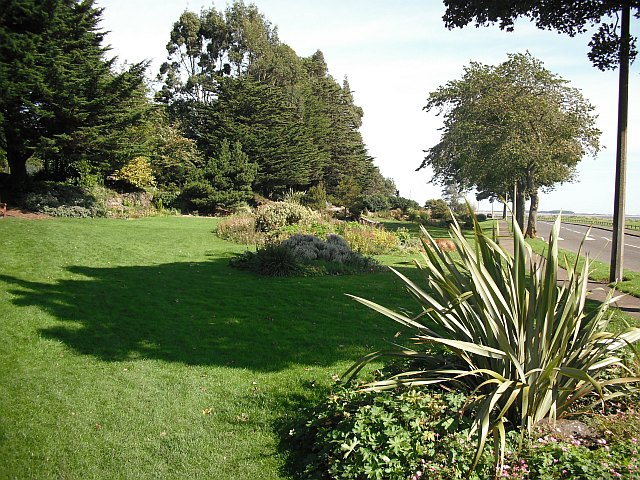
Barnhill Rock Garden

Barnhill is located in the north east of Broughty Ferry and extends to the city boundary between Dundee and Angus. The area borders the recent Balgillo Park housing development and, at North Balmossie Street, with Monifieth. It contains both private and council housing.

The main commercial area is the Campfield Shopping Square which includes a post office, a pub named The Barn as well as Co-Operative Food and Iceland stores. Also located in the area is Barnhill Cemetery.

The area was formerly the location of Dundee Convalescent Home run by Dundee Royal Infirmary and built using money given by Sir David Baxter. The Convalescent Home was demolished in 1971, and the site was acquired by the East of Scotland Housing Association. It is now occupied by Fettercairn Drive and Stracathro Terrace.

== Education ==
Barnhill Primary School is the main school for the area. While Monifieth High School is located on the border between Barnhill and Monifieth, and Monifieth High School is nearest to Barnhill Primary, most pupils will go to Grove Academy as this is run by the same council, Dundee City Council.

== Politics ==
Barnhill was a Ward of Dundee City Council, returning Conservative Councillor Bruce Mackie. This changed at the 2007 City Council elections when a STV system was adopted. Dundee has 8 Wards and Barnhill is included in one named "The Ferry". The Ferry returned 2 Conservative, 1 Scottish National Party, and 1 Liberal Democrat councillors.

== Transport ==
Barnhill is approximately 10–15 minutes walk from Broughty Ferry town centre. Strathtay and Xplore Dundee buses also provide regular services to Broughty Ferry and Dundee City Centre.

The area was formerly served by a railway station on the long closed Dundee and Forfar Direct Line. Balmossie railway station, on the Edinburgh to Aberdeen line, is close to Barnhill, but is actually situated just inside the neighbouring town of Monifieth.
