= Felin Fran Halt railway station =

Disused railway station in Llansamlet, Swansea

Coordinates: 51.6692°N 3.8915°W

Felin Fran Halt

General information
- Location: Llansamlet, Glamorganshire; Wales
- Platforms: 2

Other information
- Status: Disused

History
- Original company: Great Western Railway
- Post-grouping: Great Western Railway

Key dates
- 2 January 1922: Opened
- 11 June 1956: Closed to passengers
- 1965: Closed to goods
Location

Felin Fran Halt railway station co-served the area of Llansamlet, in the historical county of Glamorganshire, Wales, from 1922 to 1956 on the Swansea District Line.

== History ==
The station was opened on 2 January 1922 by the Great Western Railway. It closed to passengers on 11 June 1956 and closed to goods in 1965.

Preceding station	Disused railways	Following station
Llandarcy Platform; Line open, station closed	Great Western Railway; Swansea District Line	Llangyfelach; Line open, station closed
Llandarcy Platform; Line open, station closed	Great Western Railway; Morriston Branch	Pentrefelin Halt; Line and station closed
