= Keinton Mandeville =

Village and civil parish in England

Coordinates: 51.0720°N 2.6507°W

- Village
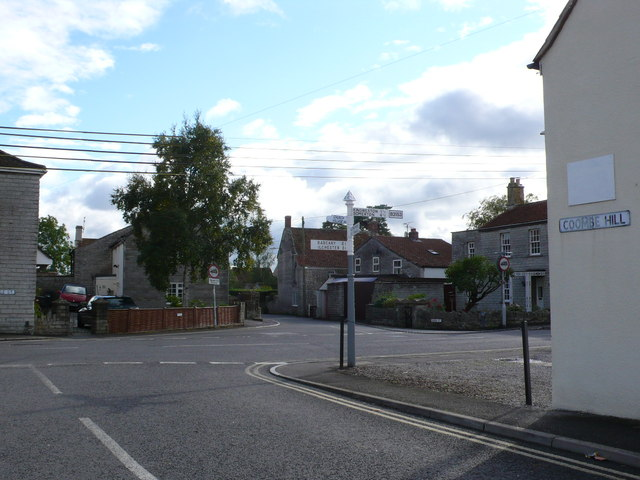
- Crossroads, Keinton Mandeville

- Location within Somerset
- Population: 1,215 (2021)
- OS grid reference: ST545305
- Unitary authority: Somerset Council
- Ceremonial county: Somerset
- Region: South West
- Country: England
- Sovereign state: United Kingdom
- Post town: Somerton
- Postcode district: TA11
- Dialling code: 01458
- Police: Avon and Somerset
- Fire: Devon and Somerset
- Ambulance: South Western
- UK Parliament: Glastonbury and Somerton

Keinton Mandeville, commonly referred to as Keinton, is a village and civil parish in Somerset, England, situated on top of Combe Hill, 6 miles (9.7 km) west of Castle Cary. The village has a population of 1,215. It is located next to Barton St David.

The village is well known for its history of quarrying and Blue Lias stone which is found locally in the region, as well as the birth of Henry Irving, the first actor to be knighted. A blue plaque is placed in high street where he was born to commemorate him.

== History ==
At the time of the Domesday Book it was known as Chintone meaning the noble's enclosure from the Old English cyne and tun. The Mandeville part of the village's name came from Stephen de Mandeville around 1243.

The parish was previously called Keinton Mansfield. It was part of the hundred of Catsash.

Times Past In Keinton Mandeville shows an insight into life in the village from people who lived there. It contains old photos and information about the villages past.

The village was formerly home to branches of two banks, National Westminster Bank and Lloyds. Both closed in the early 90s.

Keinton Mandeville once had a butcher, baker, blacksmith, ironmonger, wheelwright, carpenter, carrier, draper, hats and haberdashery, grocer, garage, two banks, post office, two chapels, a policeman, railway, social club and 18 different stone quarries.

Keinton Mandeville railway station opened in 1905, but closed in 1962 due to beeching cuts.

On the 18 Feb 2023, 226 trees and shrubs were planted for the Queens Green Canopy project.

== Governance ==
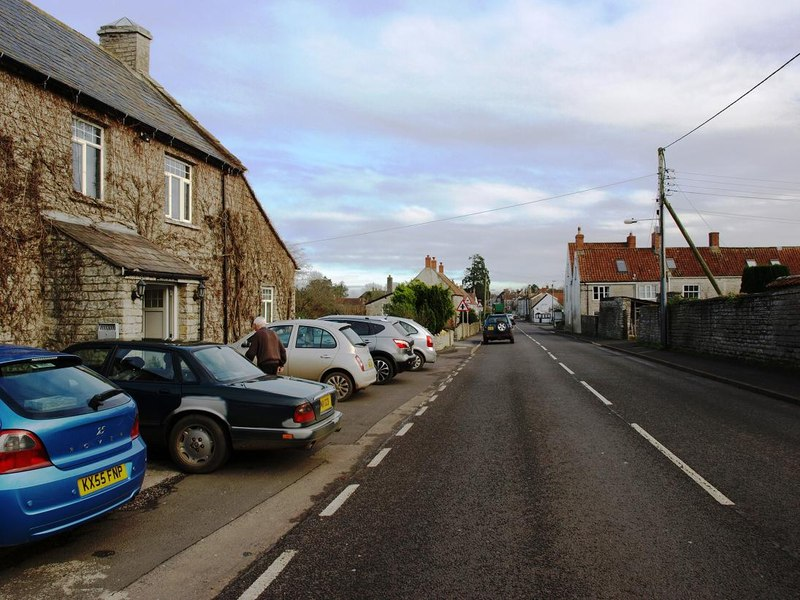
B3153 through Keinton, showing the Quarry Inn on the left.

Keinton Mandeville is in the Somerton electoral ward, which elects 2 councillors every 4 years to Somerset Council. It also has a parish council with responsibility for local issues.

Previously the village was within the district of South Somerset from 1974 to 2023, and within Langport Rural District from 1894 to 1974.

It is part of the Glastonbury and Somerton constituency for elections to the House of Commons of the Parliament of the United Kingdom.

== Places of interest ==
- Keinton Mandeville school which provides education for 151 children. In the grounds is a listed dovecote.
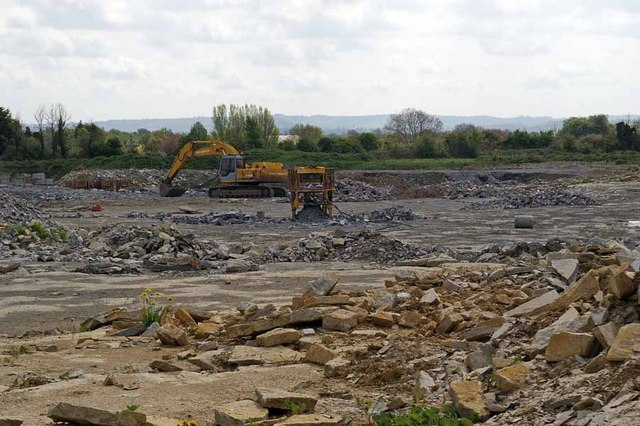
  Former quarry in Keinton Mandeville.
- Lake View quarry which was used for the extraction of Blue Lias building stone (It has now been turned into a housing estate)
- The Three Old Castles Inn which was built in the late 18th century was a public house but has now closed and is a private house.
- In the High Street is the Quarry Inn, the last remaining pub in the village.
- Village hall which was built in 1998.
- The MUGA (multi use games area) which was built in 2013.

== Religious sites ==
The Church of St. Mary Magdalene dates from the 13th century and has been designated by English Heritage as a Grade II listed building.

There is also a Wesleyan Methodist Chapel which was built in 1843.

== Notable residents ==
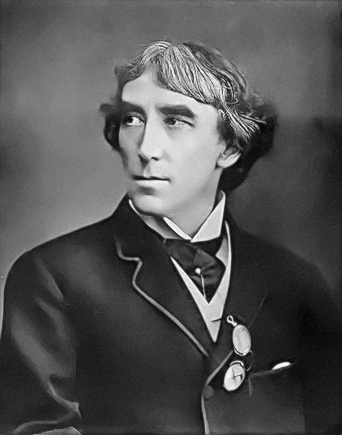
Portrait of Irving

Irving House in Castle Street was the birthplace of actor Henry Irving. It is a Grade II listed building and has a bronze plaque which reads Here was born Henry Irving, Knight, Actor, 6th February 1838. * Irving Road, which was built in the late 1980s, was named after Irving.
