= Barnhill railway station (Angus) =

Disused railway station in Dundee, Scotland

Barnhill

General information
- Location: Barnhill, Dundee City; Scotland
- Coordinates: 56.4745°N 2.8471°W
- Grid reference: NO479316
- Platforms: 1

Other information
- Status: Disused

History
- Pre-grouping: Caledonian Railway
- Post-grouping: London, Midland and Scottish Railway

Key dates
- 1 September 1874: Opened as Barnhill
- 30 June 1952: Renamed as Barnhill (Angus)
- 10 January 1955: Closed to passengers
- 9 October 1967: Closed completely
Location
- Location within Dundee City council area

Barnhill railway station was a railway station in Scotland serving the suburb of Barnhill, Dundee.

== History ==
The station was opened as Barnhill on 1 September 1874 by the Caledonian Railway on the Dundee and Forfar direct line which had been open since 12 August 1870.

The station had a single platform on a passing loop, there was a signal box and a small goods yard equipped with a 1½ ton crane.

A camping coach was positioned here by the Scottish Region from 1957 to 1964. The station was renamed Barnhill (Angus) on 30 June 1952 before closing to passengers on 10 January 1955. The line closed completely on 9 October 1967.

== Bibliography ==
- McRae, Andrew (1998). British Railways Camping Coach Holidays: A Tour of Britain in the 1950s and 1960s. Vol. Scenes from the Past: 30 (Part Two). Foxline. ISBN 1-870119-53-3.
- Quick, Michael (2022) [2001]. Railway passenger stations in Great Britain: a chronology (PDF). version 5.04. Railway & Canal Historical Society. Archived from the original (PDF) on 25 November 2022.
- The Railway Clearing House (1970) [1904]. The Railway Clearing House Handbook of Railway Stations 1904 (1970 D&C Reprint ed.). Newton Abbot: David & Charles Reprints. ISBN 0-7153-5120-6.
- Thomas, John; Turnock, David (1989). A Regional History of the Railways of Great Britain. Vol. 15 The North of Scotland (1st ed.). Newton Abbott, Devon: David & Charles. ISBN 0-946537-03-8.
