= The Pilot Inn railway station =

Former railway station in England

Coordinates: 50.92810°N 0.97317°E

The Pilot Inn
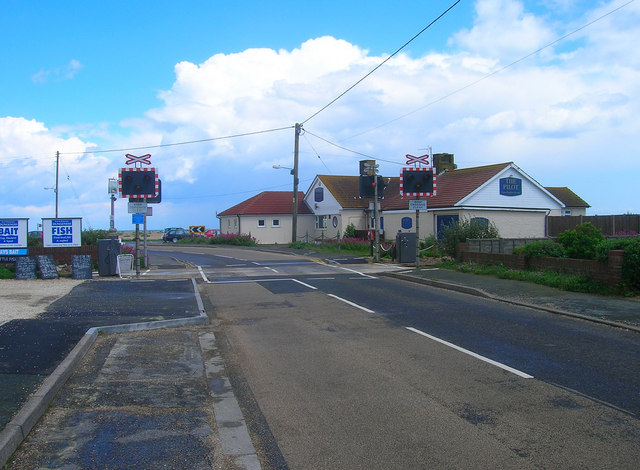
- The level crossing near the site of the station in 2007

General information
- Location: Romney Marsh, Folkestone & Hythe; England
- Platforms: 2 (1 from 1947)

Other information
- Status: Disused

History
- Original company: RHDR

Key dates
- 24 May 1928: Opened
- 30 June 1940: Closed
- 21 March 1947: Reopened
- November 1977: Officially closed
- November 1983: Actually closed
- January 1985: Removed from timetables
Location

The Pilot Inn railway station was a station on the Romney, Hythe and Dymchurch Railway in Kent, England.

Opened on 24 May 1928, this station was a temporary terminus whilst construction of the remaining section of track to Dungeness continued. It was necessary to make temporary provision for the termination of trains at this location, which included a portable wooden hut for use as a booking office, and a turning triangle of track, to enable locomotives to change direction before their return journey to New Romney.

Three months later the line was fully opened all the way to Dungeness; however, and as a matter of confusion for later historians, the station at Dungeness was known as "Lighthouse", whilst the station at The Pilot Inn became known (and marked on tickets) as Dungeness - Pilot. This confusion was short-lived, and the station returned to its originally planned name of The Pilot Inn (named after a nearby hostelry, still trading today) whilst the terminus at the lighthouse became known as "Dungeness Lighthouse" and subsequently just "Dungeness".

In 1929, a year after opening, the station buildings at The Pilot Inn were completed, and the temporary wooden hut was removed. The permanent buildings consisted of a short concrete platform, and a single structure on the landward side of the 'up' line. This building was light and airy, having windows in all four sides, including three windows on the back face of the building, and two windows plus a glass door on the front face. It served as a more than adequate station building for 10 years until 1939, when The Pilot Inn was destaffed.

After the war the railway (which had become a military line during hostilities) was returned to the railway company, but it became necessary to reduce the Dungeness line to single-track, in order to maintain a service with limited resources. The over-large station at The Pilot Inn, now generally known as The Pilot Halt, was used as staff accommodation. George Barlow (a well known railwayman, who worked on the Romney, Hythe & Dymchurch Railway for 40 years, and was awarded the British Empire Medal for his service) who was a regular driver, took up residence in the station building in 1947, and years later reported that it had been a comfortable family home, albeit somewhat cramped.

The station buildings were finally demolished in 1967, and replaced in 1968 with a simple breeze-block construction shelter, with an open front. The Pilot Halt continued as a request stop on the railway until 1977, when it officially closed. However, over the following five years from 1978 to 1983 there was some activity at the station, with special trains calling there by arrangement, and it remained listed in railway timetables; however, the installation of electronic track circuitry in connection with a nearby level crossing had rendered any general re-opening unlikely, as the track circuits have no way of knowing whether an approaching train intends to stop or not.

The Pilot Halt was shown in the railway's 1984 timetable, although no advertised trains stopped there. Since 1985 the station has been unmentioned in any official railway publication, other than those which are strictly historical. During the mid-1990s the last (1968) station shelter was demolished. However, visitors to the site of the station may still see, in the shingle, the concrete foundations of both the 1968 shelter, and the 1929 station buildings, including the layout (at foundation level) of the different rooms of this 1929 building.

Preceding station	Heritage railways	Following station
Former service
Britannia Points Halt Line open, station closed towards Dungeness	Romney, Hythe & Dymchurch Railway	Lade Line open, station closed towards Hythe
