= Immingham (Queens Road) electric railway station =

Railway station in Immingham, England

Immingham (Queens Road)

General information
- Location: Immingham, North East Lincolnshire; England
- Coordinates: 53.6170°N 0.1887°W
- Grid reference: TA199149
- Platforms: 0

Other information
- Status: Disused

History
- Original company: Great Central Railway
- Pre-grouping: Great Central Railway
- Post-grouping: London and North Eastern Railway

Key dates
- 1914: extension electrified
- 20 July 1915: passed Board of Trade inspection
- 1939-45: overhead wires and points removed
- by 1955: all trace removed
Location

Immingham (Queens Road) electric railway station would have been a halt on the Grimsby and Immingham Electric Railway, but it never opened to fare paying passengers. Electrified track was laid to the station site and quarterly proving cars ran for nearly twentyfive years, but no revenue-earning car ever travelled to or from the halt.

== Overview ==
The electric railway was built primarily to carry workers between Grimsby and Immingham Dock which the Great Central Railway had built on a greenfield site in a sparsely populated area. The line was built by the Great Central and remained in railway ownership up to closure in 1961. It therefore appeared in railway timetables and it was possible to buy through tickets between any of the stops on the line and anywhere on the national railway network, though there never was any physical connection with any conventional track, nor with the tramways in Grimsby and Cleethorpes.

In modern parlance the vehicles would be described as trams, but they were typically referred to locally as "tramcars", with related things being called names such as "tramcar halt" and "tramcar bridge" with "car" a more common short form than "tram."

== Location and facilities ==
Immingham Town - known locally as "Tramcar Halt" - was situated outside the dock estate in what in 2012 was still open country. It was the nearest point to the line for its two lesser markets - railwaymen travelling to and from Immingham engine shed and residents of the village of Immingham, by far the greatest market being dock workers. The station was nevertheless a third of a mile from the engine shed and a good mile from the village proper.

When the line was proposed it included plans to continue from Immingham Town southwest along Queens Road to a point near the footpath to engine shed, or "Loco" as it was called locally. A 1966 aerial photograph shows a single decker bus in the near foreground very close to where the tramcar halt would have been.

When the line was completed in 1913 the extension was omitted. Influential fingers were wagged so the company grudgingly built it to what would have been Queens Road Halt. The extension was single track with a passing loop at the halt. Proving tramcars ran along the extension every quarter to maintain the right of way, but no revenue earning vehicle ever traversed it. The overhead wires and points were removed in the Second World War and all trace of the unused branch had gone by 1955.

== Services ==
Unusually among British tramways, services ran round the clock, particularly to provide for railway workers based at Immingham engine shed, whose duties often involved starting or finishing at unsocial hours. Traffic was highly peaked, with convoys of tramcars leaving and arriving to match shift changes at the dock. It was normal for several tramcars to queue to reverse at Immingham Town at the peaks.

Herein lay some of the reasons the Great Central never followed through with their stated intention of running cars to Queen Road, still less to Immingham Village beyond, as was implied in some earlier publicity and repeatedly requested by Immingham Parish Council. By a large margin the line's key market was dock workers, with railway staff a distant second and Immingham villagers a distant third. While these last would have paid fares, railway staff never did throughout the line's existence, so running tracks and services would be hopelessly uneconomic. Furthermore, travelling through to Queens Road or the village would have added significant time and potential disruption to the core users' journeys, with no benefit to them whatsoever.

== Closure ==
The line took some years to die, being cut back at the Grimsby end in 1956 then reduced to peak services only in 1959, when it disappeared from Bradshaw and through ticketing beyond the line was withdrawn. Formal closure of the line and Immingham Town tramcar halt came on Monday 3 July 1961, with the last tramcars running on Saturday 1 July 1961, when a convoy of six cars set off from Immingham Dock, nominally at 14:03. The last tramcar of this convoy and therefore the last from Immingham Town was Number 4.

== Aftermath ==
The first track on the line to be removed was at Dock tramcar station, to give increased parking space. The process of demolition was piecemeal and even in 2013 many hints of the line remained, such as spun concrete masts near Immingham Town.

Former Services

Preceding station	Disused railways	Following station
Terminus	Great Central Railway; Grimsby and Immingham Electric Railway	Immingham Town; Line built but never opened

== Further material ==
- Anderson, Paul (1992). Railways of Lincolnshire. Oldham: Irwell Press. ISBN 978-1-871608-30-4.
- Bett, W. H.; Gillham, J. C. (1979). The Tramways of South Yorkshire and Humberside. London: Light Railway Transport League. ISBN 978-0-900433-75-7.
- Feather, T. (February 1993). "Great Central Inter-Urban". Forward. Great Central Railway Society. ISSN 0141-4488.
- Ludlam, A.J. (July 2006). Kennedy, Rex (ed.). "Immingham-Gateway to the Continent". Steam Days (203). Bournemouth: Redgauntlet Publications. ISSN 0269-0020.
- Ludlam, A.J. (1996). Railways to New Holland and the Humber Ferries, LP 198. Headington: The Oakwood Press. ISBN 978-0-85361-494-4.
- Electric Traction Archive (DVD), vol. 118, B&R Video Productions, contains a fine archive section on the tramway
- The Passing of Pyewipe (DVD), Online Video, available via Great Central Railway Society, solely about the tramways of Immingham, Grimsby & Cleethorpes
