= Lade railway station =

Railway station in Romney Marsh, Kent, England

Coordinates: 50.94831°N 0.96535°E

Lade

General information
- Location: Romney Marsh, Folkestone & Hythe; England
- Platforms: 1

Other information
- Status: Disused

History
- Original company: RHDR

Key dates
- 24 May 1928: Opened
- 30 June 1940: Closed
- 21 March 1947: Reopened
- 1977: Closed
- 1985: Removed from timetables
Location

Lade railway station was a station on the Romney, Hythe and Dymchurch Railway in Kent, England.

== History ==
In common with most stations on the Dungeness line of the railway (as far as The Pilot Inn), Lade station opened for business on 24 May 1928. Despite having full station status, it was never intended to be a major station. It was not even provided with hard platform surfaces, and the only construction on site was a simple, but elegant, Greenly-style waiting shelter. This had a concrete base with wooden construction above. There were glass windows in the two ends, and an open front for access. The roof included simple decoration at the apex, and overhung the front of the shelter to form an awning-type cover for a few feet outside the main building, the overhang being supported by curved wooden supports attached to the front of the shelter.

The station was never staffed, and never intended to be staffed. It served a small collection of fishermen's cottages, and was soon reduced in status to a halt. Exactly when this happened is unclear, but photographic evidence from 1936 shows the front of the shelter with two small signs attached (one to each side of the open front entrance) each marked "Lade Halt" in capital letters.

Shortly after World War II the Dungeness line was reduced to single-track in preparation for its re-opening in 1947, and at the same time the station shelter at Lade was demolished. However, the halt remained a request stop on the reopened line.

In 1968 the ever reducing status of the neighbouring "The Pilot Inn railway station" brought the two halts together in popular thought. Despite their very different origins, "Pilot Halt" and "Lade Halt" (as they were now known) came to be considered a pair of slightly problematic stations with identical fortunes. This was given concrete reality in 1968 when the station shelter at The Pilot was replaced with a breeze-block construction shelter, and an identical building was also constructed at Lade.

=== Closing ===
Just as at Pilot Halt, Lade Halt continued as a request stop on the railway until 1977, when it closed. Over the following years from 1978 to 1983 there was some activity at the station, with special trains calling there by arrangement; however, the installation of electronic track circuitry in connection with a nearby level crossing had rendered any general re-opening unlikely, as the track circuits have no way of knowing whether an approaching train intends to stop or not.

Lade Halt was shown in the railway's 1984 timetable, although no advertised trains stopped there. Since 1985 the station has been unmentioned in any official railway publication, other than those which are strictly historical. During the mid-1990s the second (1968) station shelter was demolished, leaving no remaining trace of the station.

| Preceding station | Heritage railways | Following station |
Former service
| The Pilot Inn Line open, station closed towards Dungeness | Romney, Hythe & Dymchurch Railway | Romney Sands Line and station open towards Hythe |
