= Gagie railway station =

Former railway station in Scotland

Gagie

General information
- Location: Scotland
- Coordinates: 56.5167°N 2.8690°W
- Platforms: 1

Other information
- Status: Disused

History
- Post-grouping: London, Midland and Scottish Railway

Key dates
- ?: Goods station opened
- 1935: Passenger station opened
- 10 January 1955: Closed
Location

Gagie Halt railway station was a railway halt in Scotland, on the Dundee and Forfar direct line, built by the London, Midland and Scottish Railway. It consisted of a single wooden platform built in 1935.
