= Llanybydder railway station =

Former railway station in Wales

Llanybydder
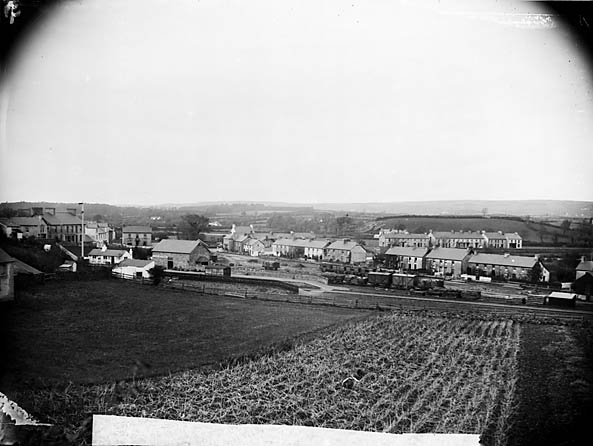
- General view of Llanybydder from the east showing the station, railway yards and houses c 1885

General information
- Location: Llanybydder, Carmarthenshire; Wales
- Coordinates: 52.0782°N 4.1507°W
- Grid reference: SN5270744394
- Platforms: 2

Other information
- Status: Disused

History
- Original company: Manchester and Milford Railway
- Pre-grouping: Great Western Railway

Key dates
- 1 January 1866: Opened
- February 1965: Closed
Location

Llanybydder railway station also Llanybyther railway station served the town of Llanybydder on the Carmarthen Aberystwyth Line in the Welsh counties of Carmarthenshire and extending into Ceredigion.

== History ==
The Manchester and Milford Railway (M&MR) opened from Pencader to Aberystwyth on 12 August 1867. The line went into receivership from 1875 to 1900.

The Great Western Railway took over the service in 1906, and fully absorbed the line in 1911. The Great Western Railway and the station passed on to British Railways on nationalisation in 1948. It was then closed by the British Railways Board. The OS maps and photographs show that it had two platforms, signal box, weighing machine, a sizeable goods shed and several associated sidings.

Passenger services ran until flooding severely damaged the line south of Aberystwyth in December 1964. A limited passenger service continued running from Carmarthen to Strata Florida until February 1965.

The line remained open for milk traffic until 1973. The station buildings have been largely demolished and cleared and the site is used as a car park. The main station building and the adjacent goods shed survive; the former is a single-storey red-brick building with yellow-brick dressings, under a pitched slated roof and the latter a rubble-stone building under a pitched slated roof.

Preceding station	Disused railways	Following station
Maesycrugiau	Great Western Railway; Carmarthen to Aberystwyth Line	Lampeter
