= Kempsey railway station (Worcestershire) =

Disused railway station in Kempsey, Worcestershire

Kempsey

General information
- Location: Kempsey, Worcestershire; England
- Coordinates: 52.121497°N 2.151727°W
- Platforms: 2

Other information
- Status: Disused

History
- Original company: Birmingham and Gloucester Railway

Key dates
- November 1841: Opened
- 4 November 1844: Closed
Location

Kempsey railway station, also known as Pirton railway station, served the village of Kempsey, Worcestershire, England, from 1841 to 1844 on the Birmingham and Gloucester Railway.

== History ==
The station was opened in November 1841 by the Birmingham and Gloucester Railway. The company also stated that Pirton station was here. It was one of many stations that only appeared in the timetable on 19 May 1842. The station closed on 4 November 1844.

Preceding station	Historical railways	Following station
Besford; Line open, station closed	Birmingham and Gloucester Railway	Wadborough; Line open, station closed
