= Llangyfelach railway station =

Short-lived railway station in Llangyfelach, Swansea

Llangyfelach

General information
- Location: Llangyfelach, Glamorganshire; Wales
- Coordinates: 51.6775°N 3.9739°W
- Grid reference: SS640992
- Platforms: 2

Other information
- Status: Disused

History
- Original company: Great Western Railway

Key dates
- 9 July 1923: Opened
- 22 September 1924: Closed
Location

Llangyfelach railway station served the village of Llangyfelach, in the historical county of Glamorganshire, Wales, from 1923 to 1924 on the Swansea District line.

== History ==
The station was opened on 9 July 1923 by the Great Western Railway. It was a very short-lived station, only being open for 1 year before closing on 22 September 1924.

Preceding station	Historical railways	Following station
Felin Fran Halt; Line open, station closed	Great Western Railway; Swansea District line	Pont Lliw; Line open, station closed
