= Ketley Town Halt railway station =

Disused railway station in Shropshire, England

Ketley Town Halt
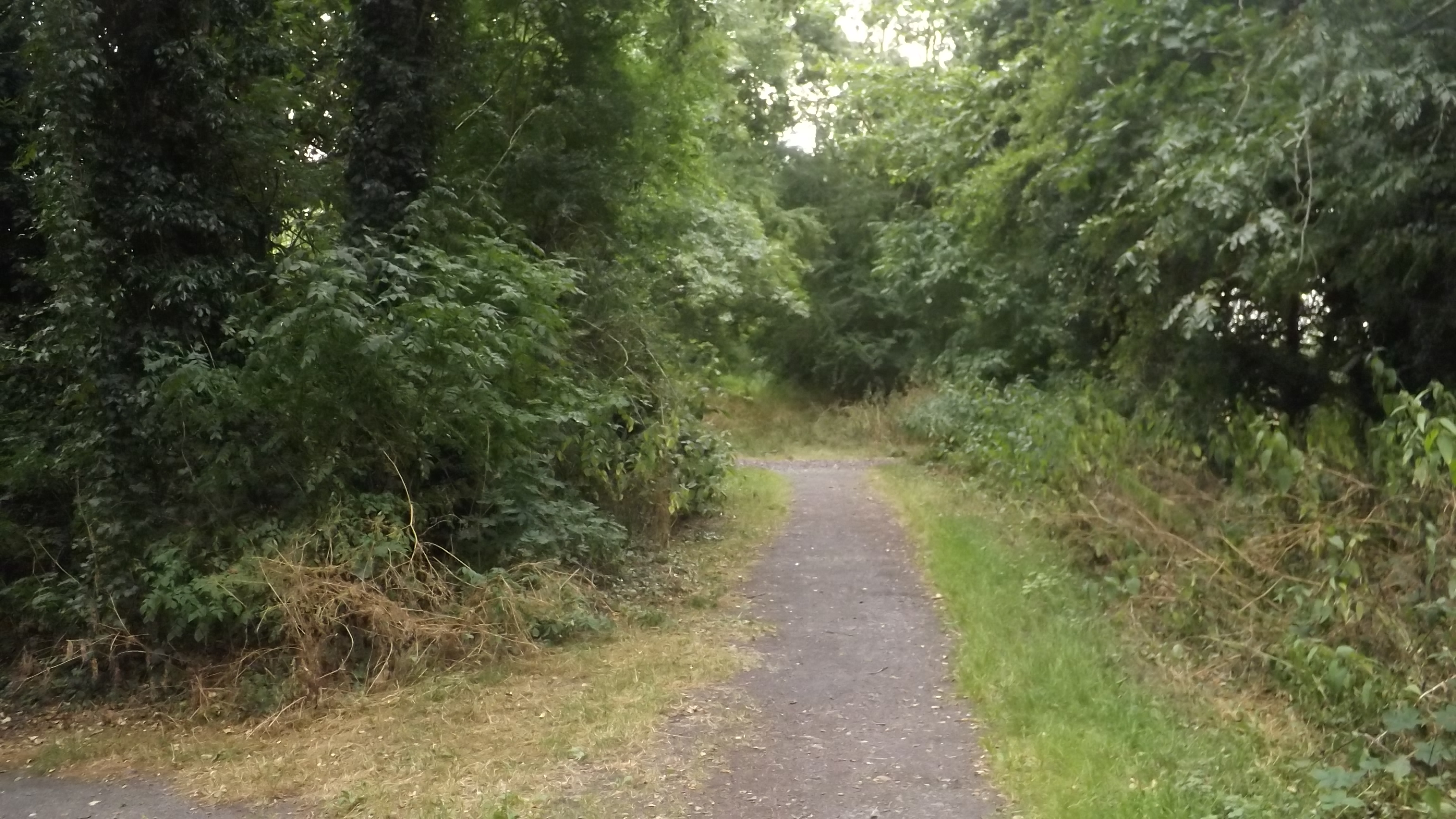

General information
- Location: Ketley, Shropshire; England
- Coordinates: 52.6892°N 2.4838°W
- Grid reference: SJ674102
- Platforms: 1

Other information
- Status: Disused

History
- Post-grouping: Great Western Railway

Key dates
- 6 March 1936: Opened
- 23 July 1962: Closed
Location

Ketley Town Halt railway station was a station in Ketley, Shropshire, England. The station was opened in 1936 and closed in 1962.

The station was located on the Severn Valley Line, which ran from Hartlebury to Shrewsbury. The station was a small halt, with minimal facilities and was primarily used by local residents and commuters. The station had a single platform, with a small shelter for passengers.

Preceding station	Disused railways	Following station
Ketley; Line and station closed	Great Western Railway; Wellington to Craven Arms Railway	New Dale Halt; Line and station closed
