= Lochee railway station =

Disused railway station in Lochee, Dundee

Coordinates: 56°28′11″N 3°00′22″W

Lochee
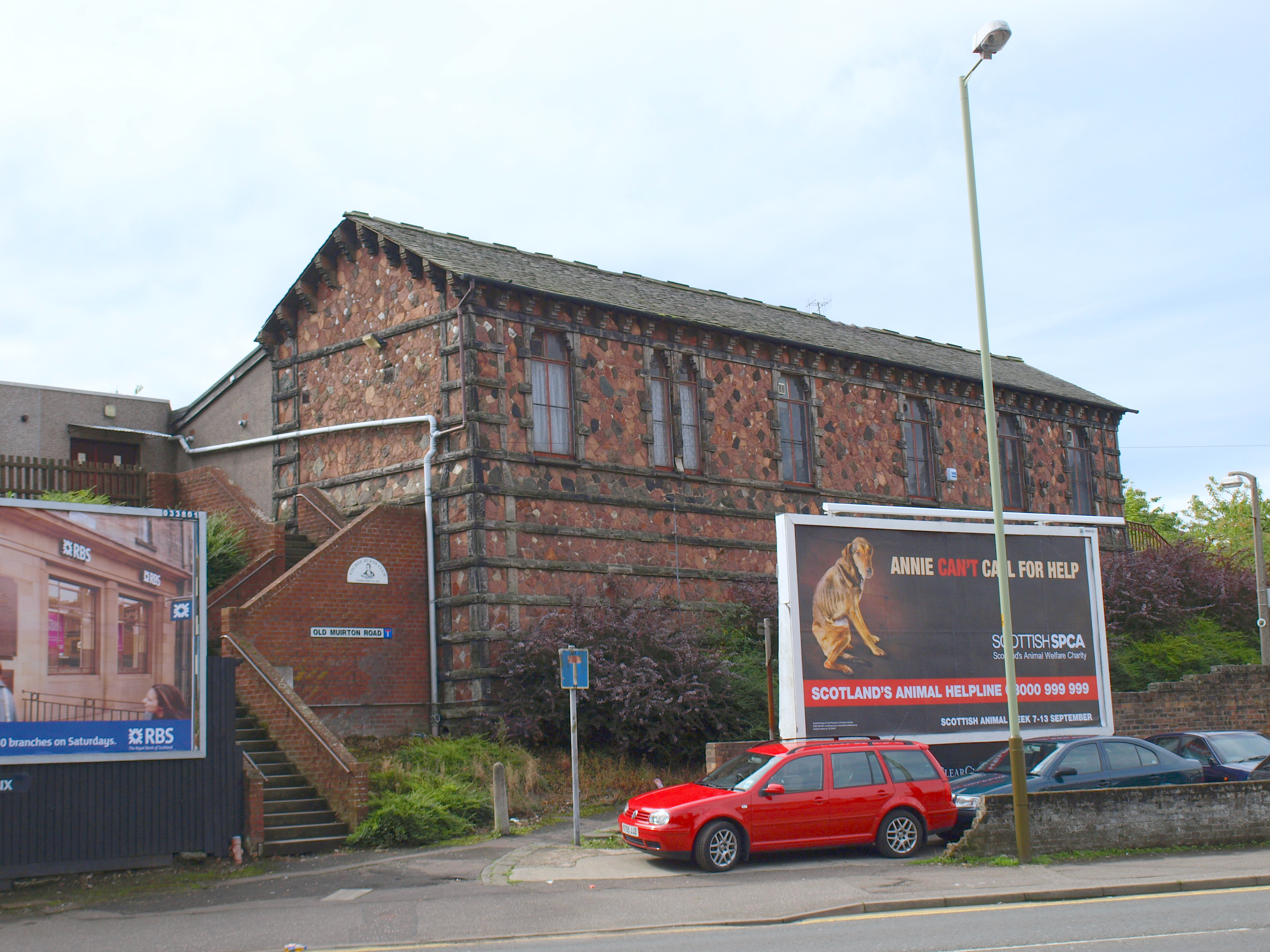
- Former station building, now Lochee Burns Club

General information
- Location: Lochee, Dundee; Scotland
- Platforms: 2

Other information
- Status: Disused

History
- Original company: Dundee and Newtyle Railway
- Pre-grouping: Caledonian Railway
- Post-grouping: London, Midland and Scottish Railway

Key dates
- 10 June 1861: Opened
- 10 January 1955: Closed
Location

Lochee railway station served the area of Lochee, Dundee, Scotland from 1861 to 1955 on the Dundee and Newtyle Railway.

== History ==
Designed by Edinburgh architect Sir James Gowans for the Dundee and Newtyle Railway, it was opened on 10 June 1861. A loop ran to Lochee Goods and Camperdown Line Works. The station closed to both passengers and goods traffic on 10 January 1955.

The station building was converted to in 1972 to the Lochee Burns Club, a social club and is now a category B listed building.

| Preceding station | Disused railways | Following station |
|---|---|---|
| Baldovan; Line and station closed | Dundee and Newtyle Railway | Lochee West; Line and station closed |
