= Leslie railway station =

Disused railway station in Leslie, Fife

Leslie

General information
- Location: Leslie, Fife; Scotland
- Coordinates: 56.1977°N 3.219°W
- Grid reference: NO244012
- Platforms: 1

Other information
- Status: Disused

History
- Original company: Leslie Railway
- Pre-grouping: North British Railway
- Post-grouping: London and North Eastern Railway

Key dates
- 1 February 1861: Opened
- 4 January 1932: Closed for passengers
- 1967: closed completely
Location

Leslie railway station served the village of Leslie, Fife, Scotland, from 1861 to 1932 on the Leslie Railway.

== History ==
The station was opened on 1 February 1861 by the Leslie Railway. To the south was the goods shed, the goods yard being further to the south. It also has an exchange yard near the junction. Fettykill Paper Mill was served by trains reversing from Markinch. On the south side of the line was the signal box, which opened in 1891. It closed in 1926. The station closed on 4 January 1932.. The branch line was open for freight trains to serve a paper mill until 1967.

Preceding station	Disused railways	Following station
Markinch; Line and station closed	Leslie Railway	Terminus
