= Kingsmuir =

Coordinates: 56.6328°N 2.8511°W

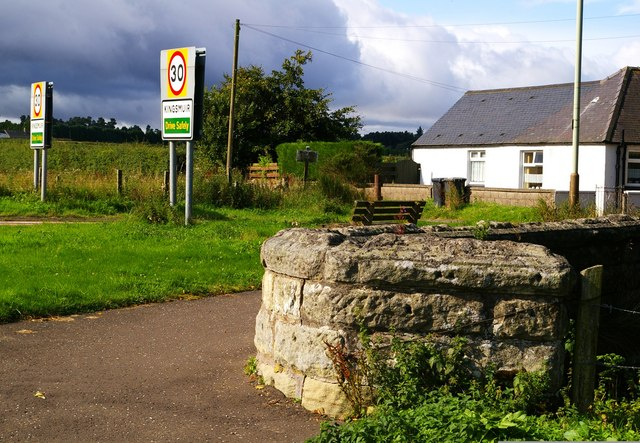
- East end of Kingsmuir

- Location within Angus
- OS grid reference: NO477494
- Council area: Angus
- Lieutenancy area: Angus
- Country: Scotland
- Sovereign state: United Kingdom
- Post town: FORFAR
- Postcode district: DD8
- Dialling code: 01307
- Police: Scotland
- Fire: Scottish
- Ambulance: Scottish
- UK Parliament: Angus
- Scottish Parliament: Angus South

Kingsmuir is a small village in Angus, Scotland, one mile south-east of Forfar on the B9128 Carnoustie to Forfar road.
