= Langwith Colliery railway station =

Disused railway station in Whaley Thorns, Derbyshire

Langwith Colliery

General information
- Location: Whaley Thorns, Derbyshire; England
- Coordinates: 53.2303°N 1.2079°W
- Grid reference: SK529706

Other information
- Status: Disused

History
- Original company: Midland Railway
- Pre-grouping: Midland Railway
- Post-grouping: London, Midland and Scottish Railway

Key dates
- 4 November 1894: Opened
- After 1945: Closed
Location

Langwith Colliery railway station served the miners of the colliery in Whaley Thorns, Derbyshire, England, from 1894 to 1945 on the Mansfield to Worksop line.

== History ==
The station was opened on 4 November 1894 by the Midland Railway. It didn't appear in the timetable. It closed after 1945.

Preceding station	Disused railways	Following station
Langwith; Line and station closed	Midland Railway; Mansfield to Worksop line	Creswell; Line and station closed
