= Lands railway station =

Disused railway station in Low Lands, County Durham

Lands

General information
- Location: Low Lands, County Durham; England
- Coordinates: 54.6169°N 1.7921°W
- Grid reference: NZ135246

Other information
- Status: Disused

History
- Original company: Stockton and Darlington Railway
- Pre-grouping: North Eastern Railway

Key dates
- 13 October 1858: Opened
- 1 May 1872: Closed
Location

Lands railway station served the hamlet of Low Lands, County Durham, England, from 1858 to 1872 on the Haggerleases branch of the Stockton and Darlington Railway.

== History ==
The station was opened on 13 October 1858 by the Stockton and Darlington Railway. Trains initially ran every day but services were reduced to Thursdays and Saturdays after Evenwood was resited in May 1864. The station closed on 1 May 1872.

Preceding station	Disused railways	Following station
Evenwood; Line and station closed	Stockton and Darlington Railway; Haggerleases branch	Haggerleases; Line and station closed
