= Long Sutton and Pitney railway station =

Former railway station in England

Long Sutton and Pitney
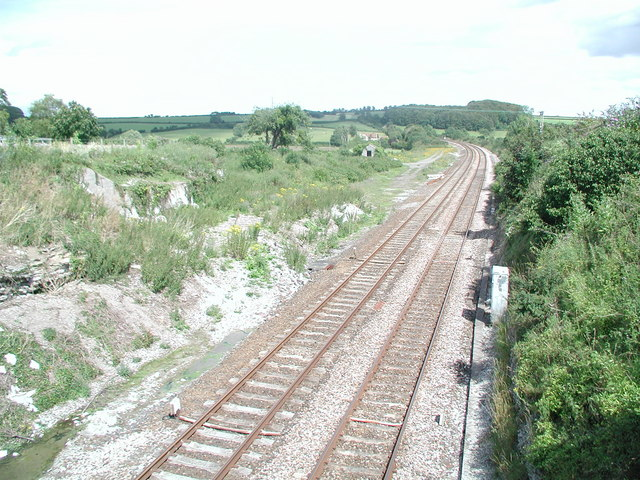
- Site of the station

General information
- Location: Upton, Somerset; England
- Coordinates: 51.0398°N 2.7758°W
- Platforms: 2

Other information
- Status: Disused

History
- Pre-grouping: Great Western Railway
- Post-grouping: Great Western Railway

Key dates
- 1 October 1907: Opened
- 10 Sept 1962: Closed for passengers
Location

Long Sutton and Pitney railway station was a minor railway station situated in the hamlet of Upton, Somerset, about one mile equidistant from the two larger villages the station was named after.

The station was on the Langport and Castle Cary Railway of the Great Western Railway, and was situated around a mile west from Somerton Tunnel. While it closed in 1962, the line itself is still in use as part of the Reading to Taunton line.

The site is one option being considered in 2021 for a new station to serve the nearby towns of Langport and Somerton.

== Services ==
Preceding station	Historical railways	Following station
Langport East	Langport and Castle Cary Railway (Great Western Railway)	Somerton
