= Lazenby railway station =

Disused railway station in Lazenby, Redcar and Cleveland

Lazenby

General information
- Location: Lazenby, Redcar and Cleveland; England
- Coordinates: 54.598°N 1.1331°W
- Grid reference: NZ561228

Other information
- Status: Disused

History
- Original company: Middlesbrough and Redcar Railway
- Pre-grouping: North Eastern Railway

Key dates
- 5 June 1846: Opened to the public
- May 1864: Closed
Location

Lazenby railway station served the village of Lazenby, North Yorkshire, England, from 1846 to 1864 on the Middlesbrough and Redcar Railway.

== History ==
The station was opened to the public on 5 June 1846 by the Middlesbrough and Redcar Railway, although it had opened a day earlier for a VIP special and an excursion. Lazenby station was 4 1/2 miles (7.2 km) east of Middlesbrough, and 3 1/2 miles (5.6 km) west of the original Redcar railway station. It closed in May 1864. It erroneously appeared in the 1867 and 1872 editions of the handbook of stations.

Preceding station	Historical railways	Following station
Lackenby; Line open, station closed	Middlesbrough and Redcar Railway	Redcar; Line and station open
