= Lochee West railway station =

Disused railway station in Lochee, Dundee

Lochee West
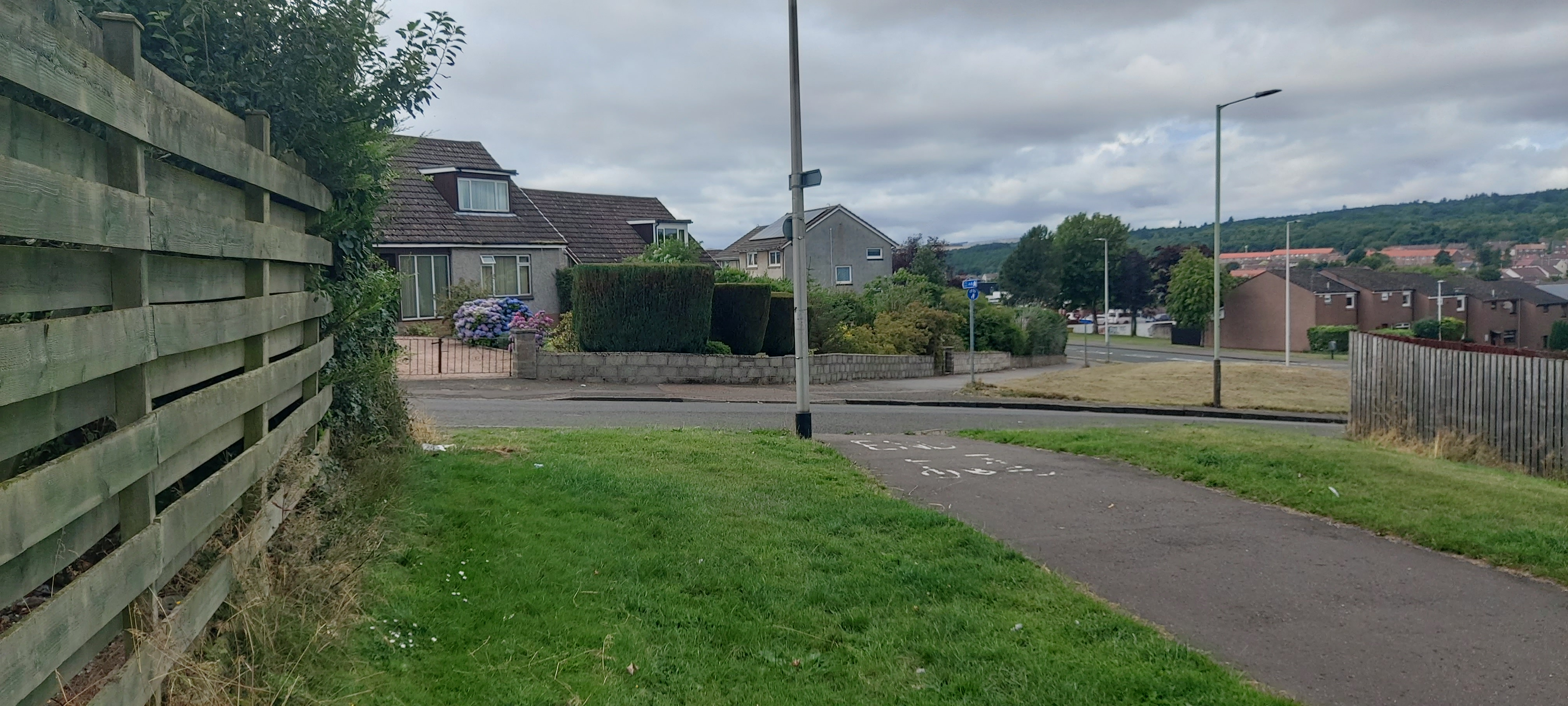
- The two houses to the left of the foreground lamp-post mark the approximate location of the former Lochee West railway station. There is no evidence left of the station or that section of track.

General information
- Location: Lochee, Dundee; Scotland
- Coordinates: 56.471450°N 3.023822°W
- Grid reference: NO370315
- Platforms: 2

Other information
- Status: Disused

History
- Original company: Dundee and Newtyle Railway
- Pre-grouping: Caledonian Railway

Key dates
- 10 June 1861: Opened as Victoria
- 1 May 1862: Name changed to Camperdown
- 1 February 1896: Name changed to Lochee West
- 1 January 1916: Closed
Location

Lochee West railway station served the area of Lochee, Dundee, Scotland from 1861 to 1916 on the Dundee and Newtyle Railway.

== History ==
The station opened as Victoria on 10 June 1861 by the Dundee and Newtyle Railway. There was a goods yard to the north which had a shed. The station's name was changed to Camperdown on 1 May 1862 and changed to Lochee West on 1 February 1896. The station closed to both passengers and goods traffic on 1 January 1916.

Preceding station	Disused railways	Following station
Lochee; Line and station closed	Dundee and Newtyle Railway	Liff; Line and station closed
