= Kirkintilloch Basin railway station =

Disused railway station in Kirkintilloch, East Dunbartonshire

Kirkintilloch Basin

General information
- Location: Kirkintilloch, East Dunbartonshire; Scotland
- Coordinates: 55.9363°N 4.1571°W
- Grid reference: NS653735

Other information
- Status: Disused

History
- Original company: Monkland and Kirkintilloch Railway
- Pre-grouping: Monkland and Kirkintilloch Railway

Key dates
- 8 July 1828: Opened
- 1846: Closed
Location

Kirkintilloch Basin railway station, also known as Middlemuir Basin railway station served the town of Kirkintilloch, East Dunbartonshire, Scotland, from 1828 to 1846 on the Monkland and Kirkintilloch Railway.

== History ==
The station was opened on 7 July 1828 by the Monkland and Kirkintilloch Railway. It was a passenger station as well as a goods depot. It was served by brief intermittent services. The first service was horse-drawn, which ran on 8 July 1828. Services stopped shortly after. Services resumed in late 1839 but stopped again in 1840. They resumed again on 26 December 1844 but stopped in March 1846.
