= Llandarcy Platform railway station =

Disused railway station in Llandarcy, Neath Port Talbot

Llandarcy Platform

General information
- Location: Llandarcy, Glamorganshire; Wales
- Coordinates: 51.6501°N 3.8522°W
- Grid reference: SS693962

Other information
- Status: Disused

History
- Original company: Great Western Railway

Key dates
- 22 September 1924: Opened
- 4 October 1947: Closed
Location

Llandarcy Halt railway station served the village of Llandarcy, in the historical county of Glamorganshire, Wales, from 1924 to 1947 on the Swansea District Line.

== History ==
The station was opened on 22 September 1924 by the Great Western Railway. It closed on 4 October 1947.

Preceding station	Historical railways	Following station
Briton Ferry; Line and station open	Great Western Railway; Swansea District Line	Felin Fran Halt; Line open, station closed
