= Killay railway station =

Disused railway station in Killay, Swansea

Killay

General information
- Location: Killay, Glamorganshire; Wales
- Coordinates: 51.612798°N 4.0276°W
- Grid reference: SS597923
- Platforms: 2

Other information
- Status: Disused

History
- Original company: Llanelly Railway
- Pre-grouping: London and North Western Railway
- Post-grouping: London, Midland and Scottish Railway

Key dates
- 14 December 1867: Opened
- 15 June 1964: Closed
Location

Killay railway station served the suburb of Killay, in the historical county of Glamorganshire, Wales, from 1867 to 1964 on the Llanelly Railway.

== History ==
The station was opened on 14 December 1867 by the Llanelly Railway. It closed on 15 June 1964. The line it served has since been converted to a cycling and pedestrian trail.

A public house called The Railway Inn served passengers and locals, and has continued operation despite the closure of the line.

The Railway Inn, adjacent to the now closed station. - geograph.org.uk - 3074740

Preceding station	Disused railways	Following station
Dunvant; Line and station closed	Llanelly Railway	Mumbles Road; Line and station closed
