= Liff railway station =

Former railway station in Dundee, Scotland

Liff Railway Station

General information
- Location: Dundee; Scotland
- Coordinates: 56.4714°N 3.0491°W
- Grid reference: NO354315
- Platforms: 1

Other information
- Status: Disused

History
- Original company: Dundee and Newtyle Railway
- Pre-grouping: Caledonian Railway
- Post-grouping: London, Midland and Scottish Railway

Key dates
- 10 June 1861: Opened
- 10 January 1955: Closed
Location
- Location within Dundee City council area

Liff railway station served the village of Liff, Angus, Scotland from 1861 to 1955 on the Dundee and Newtyle Railway; its location is within the Dundee City council area.

== History ==
The station opened on 10 June 1861 by the Dundee and Newtyle Railway. There was a siding to the west which served the goods yard. Dundee Linoleum Works opened in 1920 and was situated to the east. The station closed to both passengers and goods traffic on 10 January 1955. The station site is now a sports centre.

Preceding station	Disused railways	Following station
Lochee West; Line and station closed	Dundee and Newtyle Railway	Dundee West; Line and station closed
