= Ketley railway station =

Disused railway station in Shropshire, England

Ketley
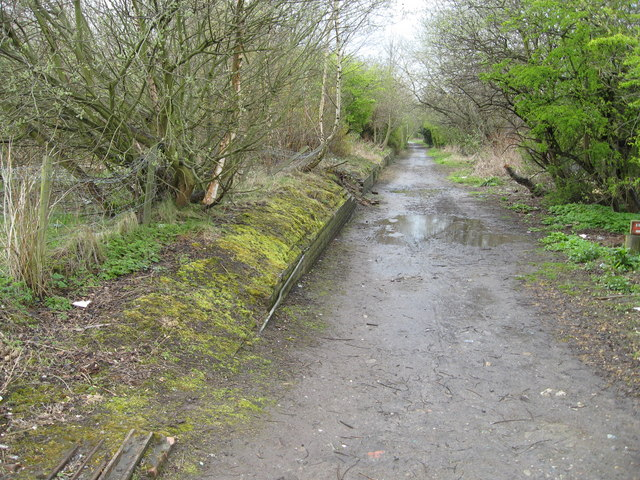
- The remains of Ketley station platform and trackbed

General information
- Location: Ketley, Shropshire; England
- Coordinates: 52.6953°N 2.4843°W
- Grid reference: SJ673109
- Platforms: 1

Other information
- Status: Disused

History
- Original company: Wellington and Severn Junction Railway
- Pre-grouping: Great Western Railway
- Post-grouping: Great Western Railway

Key dates
- 2 May 1859: Opened
- 1962: Closed
Location

Ketley railway station was a station in Ketley, Shropshire, England. The station was opened in 1859 and closed in 1962.

Preceding station	Disused railways	Following station
Wellington; Line closed, station open	Great Western Railway; Wellington to Craven Arms Railway	Ketley Town Halt; Line and station closed
