= Keinton Mandeville railway station =

Former railway station in England

Keinton Mandeville

General information
- Location: Keinton Mandeville, Somerset; England
- Grid reference: ST565304
- Platforms: 2

Other information
- Status: Disused

History
- Pre-grouping: Great Western Railway
- Post-grouping: Great Western Railway

Key dates
- 1 July 1905: Opened
- 10 September 1962: Closed

Keinton Mandeville railway station was a small railway station situated on the Great Western Railway's Langport and Castle Cary Railway. It was located in the village of Lydford-on-Fosse but was named the larger neighbouring village of Keinton Mandeville in Somerset, England.

The station opened on 1 July 1905, at the same time as Charlton Mackrell and the two stations were operated as a temporary branch from Castle Cary before the railway opened throughout as a whole the following year.

The station had two platforms and a building, as well as a small goods yard behind the east platform.

No sign of the station now remains, the site is now a scrap yard. The line is still in use as part of the Reading–Taunton line.

== Services ==
Preceding station	Historical railways	Following station
Charlton Mackrell	Langport and Castle Cary Railway (Great Western Railway)	Alford Halt
