= Kirriemuir railway station =

Disused railway station in Kirriemuir, Angus

Kirriemuir

General information
- Location: Kirriemuir, Angus; Scotland
- Coordinates: 56.6736°N 2.9983°W
- Grid reference: NO389539
- Platforms: 1

Other information
- Status: Disused

History
- Original company: Scottish North Eastern Railway
- Pre-grouping: Caledonian Railway
- Post-grouping: London, Midland and Scottish Railway

Key dates
- 12 August 1861: Opened
- 4 August 1952: Closed to passengers
- 1965: Closed completely
Location

Kirriemuir railway station served the burgh of Kirriemuir, Angus, Scotland from 1861 to 1965 on the Scottish Midland Junction Railway.

== History ==
The station opened on 12 August 1861 by the Scottish North Eastern Railway. The station was closed to passengers on 4 August 1952 and to goods traffic in 1965.
