= Langport East railway station =

Former railway station in England

Langport East
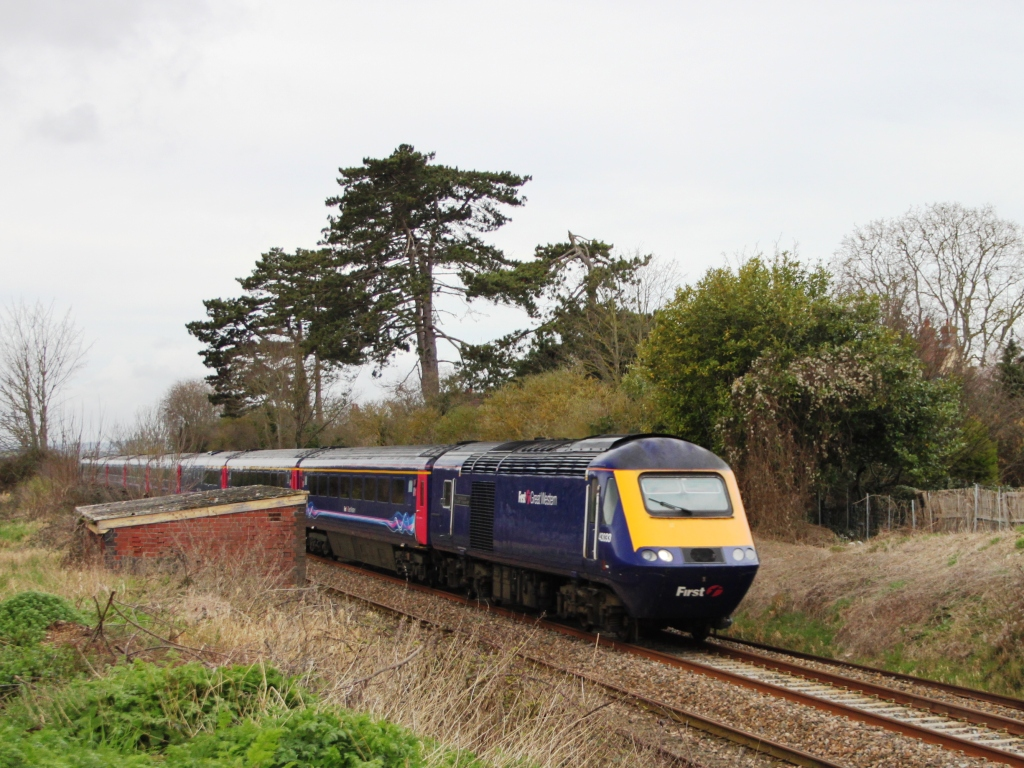
- A Class 43 passing the site of the station

General information
- Location: Langport, Somerset; England
- Coordinates: 51.0410°N 2.8255°W
- Platforms: 2

Other information
- Status: Disused

History
- Pre-grouping: Great Western Railway
- Post-grouping: Great Western Railway

Key dates
- 2 July 1906: Opened
- 10 Sept 1962: Closed for passengers
Location

Langport East was a railway station situated in Langport in Somerset. The station also served Huish Episcopi.

The station was on the Langport and Castle Cary Railway of the Great Western Railway. While it closed in 1962, the line itself is still in use as part of the Reading to Taunton line.

== Services ==
Preceding station	Historical railways	Following station
Long Sutton and Pitney	Langport and Castle Cary Railway (Great Western Railway)	Athelney
