= Dundee and Forfar direct line =

Former railway line in Scotland

Coordinates: 56.5822°N 2.8201°W

The Dundee and Forfar direct line was a railway line opened by the Caledonian Railway in 1870, connecting the important county town of Forfar with the harbour and manufacturing town of Dundee.

It crossed sparsely populated and hilly terrain, and encouraged residential travel to Dundee and enabled a shorter route for Kirriemuir to reach Dundee.

Traffic declined after 1945 and the passenger service was withdrawn on 10 January 1955. Goods services continued for some time, but the line closed completely in 1967.

== History ==
=== Background ===
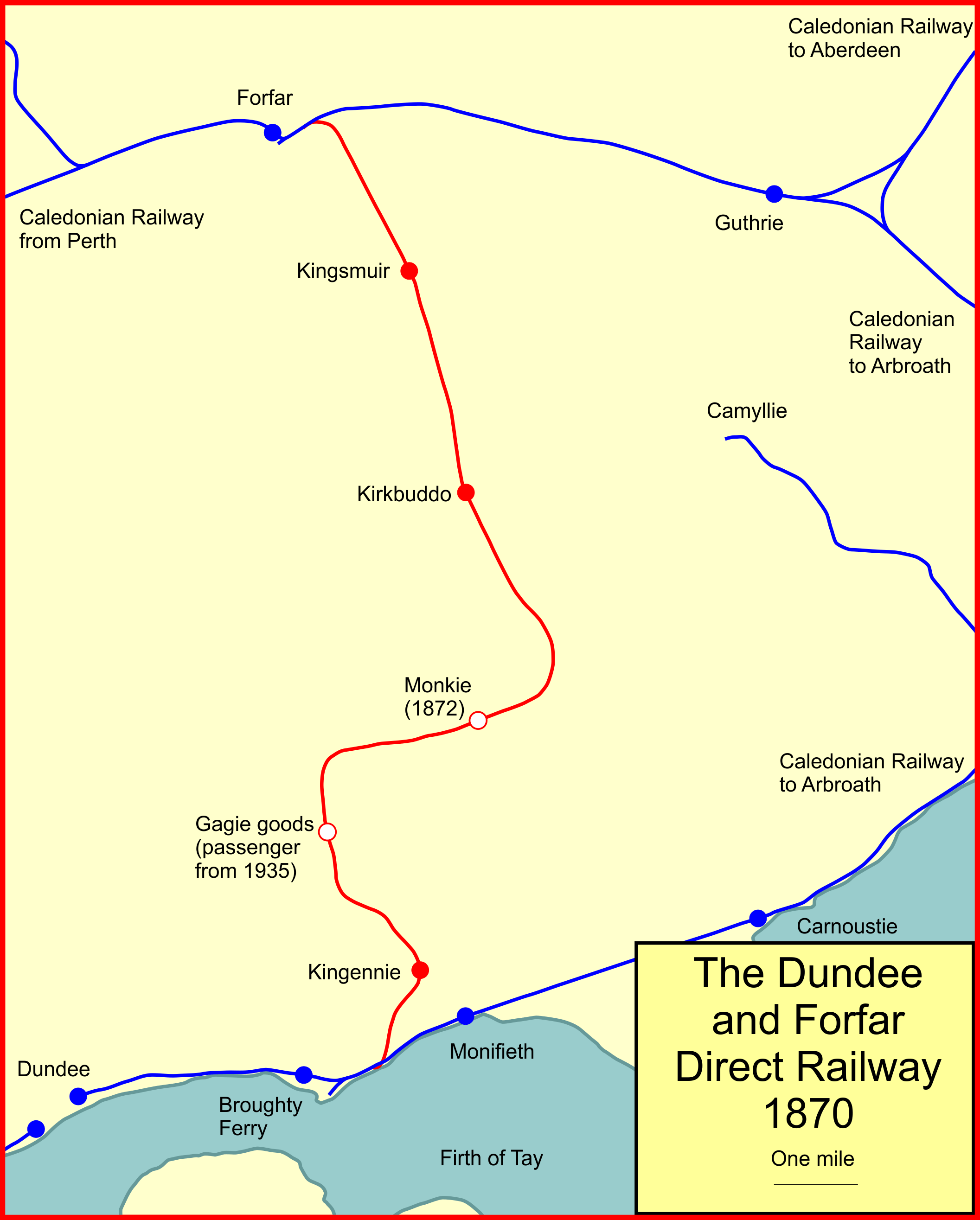
System map of the Dundee and Forfar Direct Railway

The Scottish Midland Junction Railway (SMJR) opened its main line from Perth to Forfar on 20 August 1848 and on 1 February 1848 the Aberdeen Railway opened from Forfar and also Arbroath to Montrose and Brechin; there was a delay in building onwards: the line was extended to Ferryhill, on the southern margin of Aberdeen in 1850.

The two lines worked in concert, and through trains ran between London and Aberdeen over partner railways. The SMJR and the Aberdeen Railway combined to form the Scottish North Eastern Railway (SNER) on 29 July 1856. At the same time the Scottish Central Railway (SCR) which had been friendly to the SMJR and Aberdeen Railway aligned itself away from them. The SCR controlled the line from Perth to Dundee.

The through route from central Scotland to Aberdeen was reasonably direct and collaboration continued, but the link from the SNER main line to Dundee was awkward. Dundee was important not only as a harbour town and fishing port, but also handled increasing volumes of industrial activity, demanding transport for raw materials and outward delivery of finished products. The important towns of Forfar and Kirriemuir were connected to Dundee by a long detour through Arbroath, or alternatively over the Dundee and Newtyle Railway which had a non-standard track gauge and three steep inclines operated by stationary engine and rope haulage.

The SCR gained control of the Dundee and Newtyle line, and prepared proposals to eliminate one of the difficult inclines; this encouraged it to demand a greater share of traffic between Dundee and the hinterland of Strathmore, and this move was seen as hostile by the SNER. At this stage the SNER was developing a scheme for a direct line from Dundee to Forfar, which alarmed the SCR, so there was mutual suspicion. However wiser counsel prevailed, and friendly relations developed. In the 1863 the SNER presented a parliamentary bill for a direct line between Forfar and Dundee; the route ran to the eastern margin of Dundee, on the Arbroath line; the bill was enacted.

Scottish North Eastern Railway (Dundee and Forfar) Act 1864
- Act of Parliament
- Parliament of the United Kingdom
- Long title: An Act to enable the Scottish North-eastern Railway Company to construct a new Line between Dundee and Forfar; to levy Tolls; to raise additional Capital; and for other Purposes.
- Citation: 27 & 28 Vict. c. clxxiii

Dates
- Royal assent: 14 July 1864

Other legislation
- Amended by: Caledonian Railway (Forfarshire Works) Act 1867

Status: Amended

Text of statute as originally enacted

In the following year the SNER presented a modified bill to Parliament; the Scottish North Eastern Railway (Dundee and Forfar) Act 1864 (27 & 28 Vict. c. clxxiii) was passed on 14 July 1864.

At this time the priorities of the SNER were on the negotiations for incorporation into the Caledonian Railway, and the Forfar line was not progressed. The Scottish Central Railway amalgamated with the Caledonian in July 1865, and the SNER amalgamated on 1 August 1866. The Caledonian Railway now controlled all the routes on the north side of the Tay and in Strathhmore.

=== The direct line authorised and opened ===
The Caledonian reviewed the state of the lines it had taken over, and also reconsidered the Dundee and Forfar direct line powers, which had not been activated. They decided to proceed with the scheme but to alter the alignment so as to join the Arbroath line near Broughty Ferry instead of at Dundee. On 12 August 1867 the Caledonian Railway (Forfarshire Works) Act was passed. (Note: The SNER had obtained powers to build a direct Dundee and Forfar line, but their powers were not used, and it was the Caledonian's 1867 Act that was used to build the line. Some sources, for example Marshall page 111, omit the Caledonian Act and imply that the line was built pursuant to the earlier SNER Act.)

The line opened to goods traffic on 12 August 1870. Opening for passengers required the approval of a Board of Trade inspector, and Captain Tyler visited the line on 20 October 1870. He was dissatisfied with the signalling arrangements at the junctions at either end, and with the primitive operating system in the section approaching Broughty Ferry on a steep downward gradient. Moreover, two bridges were considered to be under strength and needed to be improved, and fencing was inadequate.

The Board of Trade gave provisional permission for the commencement of passenger services on an undertaking that Tyler's comments were dealt with, and passenger operation started on 14 November 1870. Tyler visited the line again on 5 December, and still found a number of minor issues to criticise; but the railway was operating.

=== The line in operation ===
Of the three stations on the line, only Kirkbuddo had a crossing loop for passenger trains. The population density in the area served by the line was very low, and the spacing of the stations was considerable. Local people petitioned the company for a station at Monikie, and this was built, and opened in late 1871.

Near the junction at Broughty Ferry, an increasingly important residential area was building up; daily travel to places of business in Dundee was becoming important, and the company built a station at Barnhill, a short distance from the junction. This was proposed in 1873 but the Board of Trade were not disposed to agree due to the steep gradient towards the junction, and revised plans needed to be submitted. The station was opened on 1 September 1874. An improved residential train service was put on, and this encouraged further house-building.

By 1899 it was commonplace for passenger services on the line to continue to Kirriemuir or Brechin; there were also short workings from Dundee to Barnhill. In 1911 residential expresses were introduced on the line between Dundee and Kirriemuir.

=== After 1923 ===
In 1923 the railways of Great Britain were "grouped" into four larger units according to the Railways Act 1921. The Caledonian Railway was a constituent of the new London Midland and Scottish Railway which came into being on 1 January 1923 (although administrative procedures delayed the formal transfer for a few months).

By 1929 the goods train service on the line had declined to two trains each way but only on Tuesdays and Saturdays.

There had long been a goods siding at Gagie and after local pressure to provide a passenger station there it was opened in 1935.

In 1948 the main line railways were nationalised, and the LMS lines in Scotland were now part of British Railways, Scottish Region.

The area served by the line beyond Barnhill had always been very thinly populated, and it proved impossible to sustain the line. The local passenger service was withdrawn from 10 January 1955. A limited goods train service continued, but the section north of Kingsmuir, to Forfar, closed completely on 8 December 1958. The large flour mill at Monikie stopped providing traffic to the line in the early 1960s, and the entire line closed on 9 October 1967.

== Topography ==
At the junction with the Arbroath line at Broughty Ferry, the line turned towards the Tay, then climbing and crossing the main line; at opening there were stations at Kingennie, Kirkbuddo and Kingsmuir, joining the Arbroath and Forfar line at Forfar North Junction, facing west. The summit of the line near Kirkbuddo and Monikie was at an altitude of 500 feet (152 m).

Not far from Broughty Ferry the line crossed the Dighty Water on a seven arch viaduct. The steepest gradient was 1 in 60 and the sharpest curve was of 30 chains (600 m) radius. The line was a single track.

Locations on the line were:

- Broughty Junction; facing junction on the Arbroath line in the eastward direction;
- Barnhill; opened 14 October 1874; renamed Barnhill Angus in 1952;
- Kingennie;
- Gagie; goods station at first; opened as a passenger station 2 September 1935;
- Wellbank Quarry;
- Monikie; opened July 1871;
- Kirkbuddo;
- Kingsmuir;
- Forfar North Junction; trailing in to line from Arbroath, continuing towards Forfar station.
