= Devon Way =

Trail in Clackmannanshire, Scotland

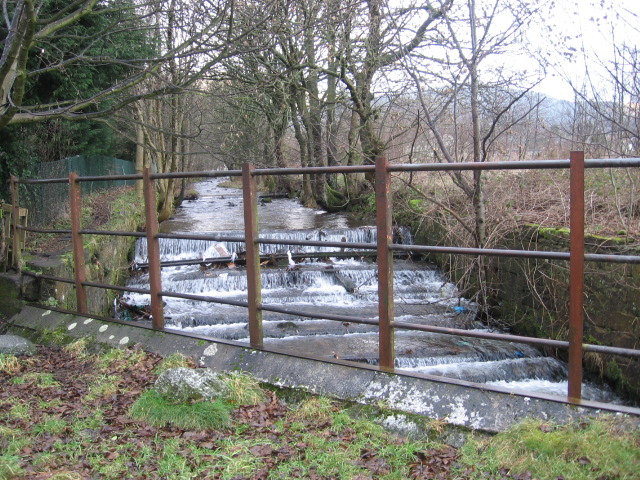
- Length: 3 1/4 miles (5.2 km)
- Location: Clackmannanshire, Scotland
- Trailheads: Dollar; 56°09′35″N 3°39′59″W; Tillicoultry; 56°09′01″N 3°44′24″W
- Use: Hiking
- Elevation change: 16 ft (4.9 m)

Devon Way is a pathway in Clackmannanshire, Central Scotland. It lies on the southern section of the former Devon Valley Railway from Dollar to Tillicoultry a distance of 3 1/4 miles (5.2 km). It is used by walkers, cyclists and horse riders and forms part of Route 767 on the National Cycle Network.

== Route ==
The way's trailhead in Dollar is just downstream of the village centre on the Dollar Burn. On the east side of the burn, head over the pedestrian footbridge and walk west to the disused platforms of Dollar railway station. The route follows close to a floodplain of the River Devon. It passes under two overbridges and through a section of woodland and across a minor road. For a short section, the path runs alongside the River Devon offering good views of King's Seat Hill and the rest of the Ochil Hills. On the outskirts of Tillicoultry, the route passes by the prominent white Sterling Furniture factory. The trailhead in Tillicoultry is on the main road just south of the High Street, close to the site of the former Tillicoultry railway station.

The 767 cycle route continues another 3 1/4 miles (5.2 km) from Tillicoultry to Alloa, for a total walk of 6 1/2 miles (10.5 km). This trail can also be extended by starting in Dollar and walking in the other direction from the Devon way, and ending in Muckhart, a total distance of 6 miles (9.7 km). It utilises the old railway, a minor road and public footpaths.

== Nearby attractions ==
Several places of interest can be easily reached from this walk: Castle Campbell, Harviestoun Castle, Ochil Hills, and the Sterling Furniture Warehouse.

== Gallery ==
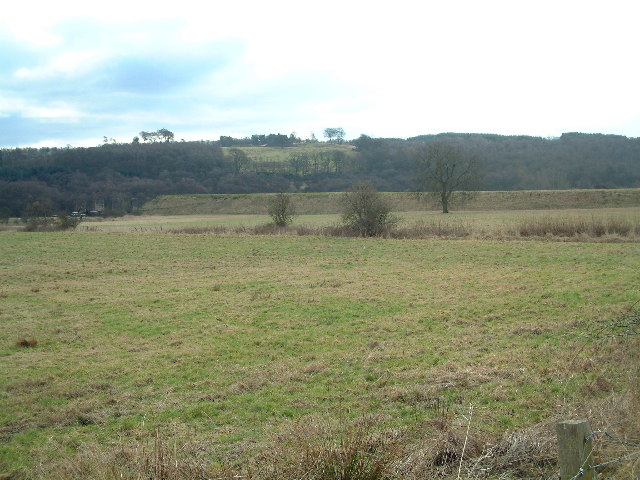
Old railway embankment near where Dollar station was

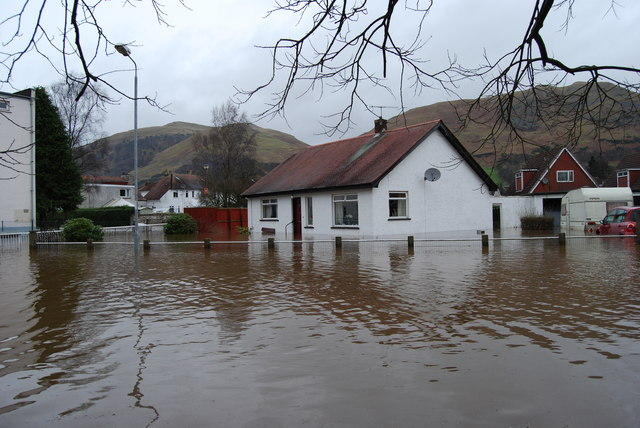
Flooding in Tillicoultry after the River Devon burst its banks in January 2008
