= Loch Leven railway station =

Disused railway station in Kinross, Perth and Kinross

Loch Leven
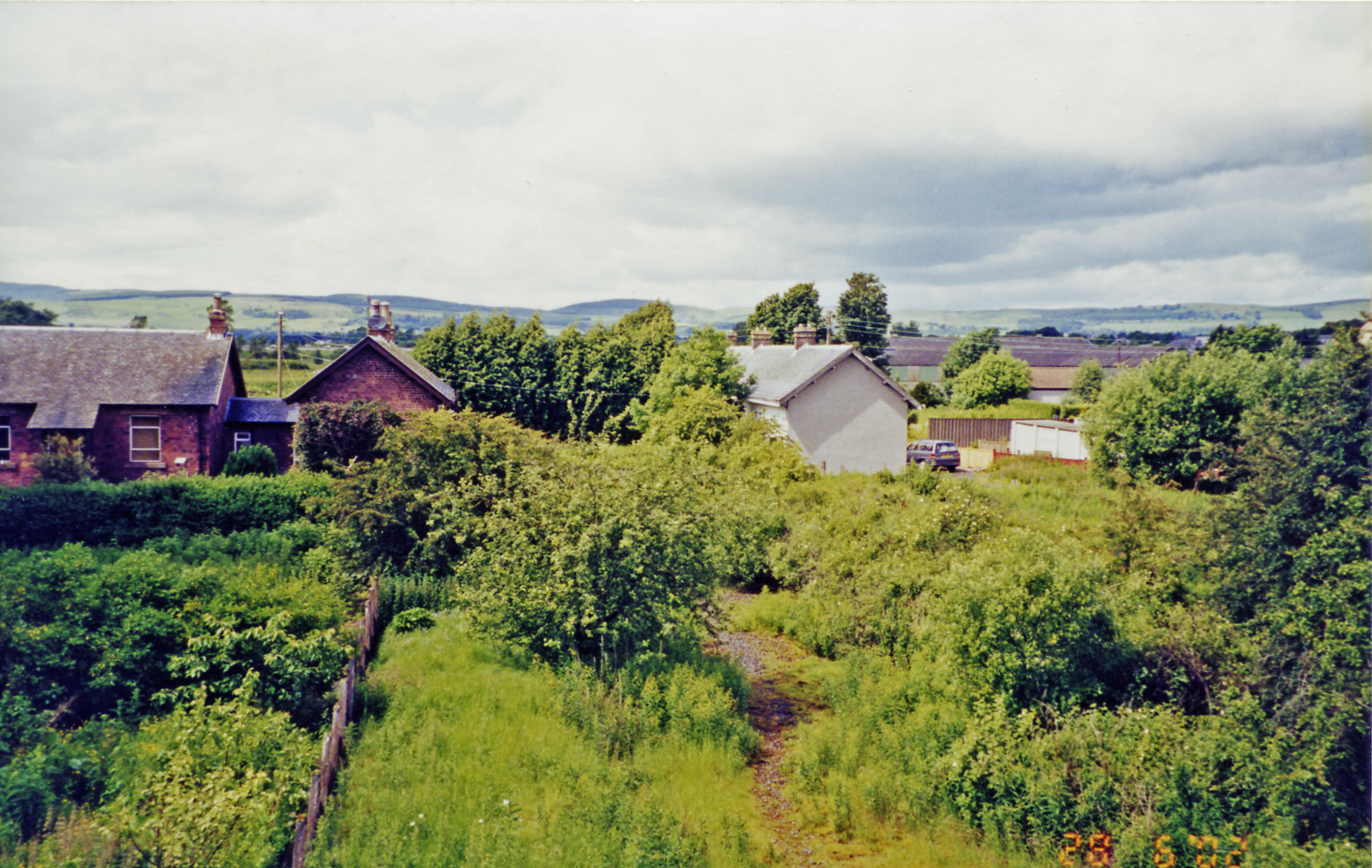
- The site of the station in 2002

General information
- Location: Kinross, Perth and Kinross; Scotland
- Coordinates: 56.1978°N 3.4239°W
- Grid reference: NO117014
- Platforms: 2

Other information
- Status: Disused

History
- Original company: North British Railway
- Pre-grouping: North British Railway
- Post-grouping: London and North Eastern Railway

Key dates
- After 20 September 1860: Opened as Kinross
- 1 October 1871: Name changed to Loch Leven
- 1 September 1921: Closed
Location

Loch Leven railway station served the burgh of Kinross, Perth and Kinross, Scotland from 1860 to 1921 on the Kinross-shire Railway.

== History ==
The station opened as Kinross sometime after 20 September 1860 by the North British Railway. To the northwest was a goods yard and a locomotive shed. Its name was changed to Loch Leven on 1 October 1871 when the Devon Valley Railway opened. To the south, also opposite the goods yard, was the signal box. The station closed on 1 September 1921.

Preceding station	Disused railways	Following station
Kinross (1860); Line and station closed	Kinross-shire Railway	Terminus
Terminus	Fife and Kinross Railway	Kinross Junction; Line and station closed
