= Glenfoot railway station =

Temporary terminus in Tillicoultry, Clackmannanshire

Coordinates: 56.1457°N 3.7564°W

Glenfoot

General information
- Location: Tillicoultry, Clackmannanshire; Scotland

Other information
- Status: Disused

History
- Original company: Devon Valley Railway

Key dates
- 3 June 1851: Opened
- 22 December 1851: Closed
Location

Glenfoot railway station was a temporary terminus that served the town of Tillicoultry, Clackmannanshire, Scotland in 1851 on the Devon Valley Railway.

== History ==
The station opened on 3 June 1851 by the Devon Valley Railway. It was a short-lived terminus, closing on 22 December of the same year when the Tillicoultry Viaduct opened.

| Preceding station | Disused railways | Following station |
|---|---|---|
| Sauchie; Line and station closed | Devon Valley Railway | Tillicoultry; Line and station closed |
