= Glenfarg railway station =

Disused railway station in Glenfarg, Perth and Kinross

Glenfarg

General information
- Location: Glenfarg, Perth and Kinross; Scotland
- Coordinates: 56.279571°N 3.397613°W
- Grid reference: NO135155
- Platforms: 2

Other information
- Status: Disused

History
- Original company: North British Railway
- Pre-grouping: North British Railway
- Post-grouping: LNER; British Railways (Scottish Region)

Key dates
- 2 June 1890: Opened
- 15 June 1964: Closed
Location

Glenfarg railway station served the village of Glenfarg, Perth and Kinross, Scotland, from 1890 to 1964, on the Glenfarg Line.

== History ==
The station opened on 2 June, 1890, by the North British Railway. To the west was the goods yard and north of the northbound platform was the signal box. To the north of the southbound platform was a refuge siding. The line was tough to use with steam locomotives so diesel locomotives were trialed in the 1920s. The station closed on 15 June 1964. The line was closed in 1970 and the route used for M90 motorway.

| Preceding station | Disused railways | Following station |
|---|---|---|
| Mawcarse; Line and station closed | Glenfarg Line | Bridge of Earn; Line and station closed |
