= Crook of Devon railway station =

Disused railway station in Crook of Devon, Kinross-shire

Coordinates: 56.1842°N 3.5521°W

Crook of Devon
- The site of the station in 1991

General information
- Location: Crook of Devon, Kinross-shire; Scotland
- Platforms: 1

Other information
- Status: Disused

History
- Original company: Devon Valley Railway
- Pre-grouping: North British Railway
- Post-grouping: LNER; British Railways (Scottish Region)

Key dates
- 1 May 1863: Opened
- 15 June 1964: Closed

Crook of Devon railway station served the village of Crook of Devon, Kinross-shire, Scotland, from 1863 to 1964 on the Devon Valley Railway.

== History ==
The station opened on 1 May 1863 by the Devon Valley Railway. It was also known as Crook of Devon for Fossoway in the 1904 timetable. It closed on 15 June 1964.

Preceding station	Disused railways	Following station
Rumbling Bridge; Line and station closed	Devon Valley Railway	Balado; Line and station closed
