= Sauchie railway station =

Disused railway station in Sauchie, Clackmannanshire

Coordinates: 56.1364°N 3.7762°W

Sauchie

General information
- Location: Sauchie, Clackmannanshire; Scotland
- Platforms: 2

Other information
- Status: Disused

History
- Original company: Devon Valley Railway
- Pre-grouping: North British Railway
- Post-grouping: LNER

Key dates
- October 1873: Opened
- 22 September 1930: Closed
Location

Sauchie railway station served the town of Sauchie, Clackmannanshire, Scotland from 1873 to 1930 on the Devon Valley Railway.

== History ==
The station opened in October 1873 by the Devon Valley Railway. To the north was Auchinbaird Siding which gave access to the pits nearby. The station closed to both passengers and goods traffic on 22 September 1930.

Preceding station	Disused railways	Following station
Alloa; Line and station closed	Devon Valley Railway	Glenfoot; Line and station closed
