= Strathmiglo railway station =

Disused railway station in Strathmiglo, Fife

Strathmiglo

General information
- Location: Strathmiglo, Fife; Scotland
- Coordinates: 56.2781°N 3.2742°W
- Grid reference: NO212102
- Platforms: 1

Other information
- Status: Disused

History
- Original company: North British Railway
- Pre-grouping: North British Railway
- Post-grouping: LNER; British Railways (Scottish Region)

Key dates
- 8 June 1857: Opened
- 5 June 1950: Closed
Location

Strathmiglo railway station served the village of Strathmiglo, Fife, Scotland from 1857 to 1950 on the Fife and Kinross Railway.

== History ==
The station opened on 8 June 1857 by the North British Railway. To the west was the goods shed which was served by a siding. To the east was a second siding. The station closed on 5 June 1950.

Preceding station	Disused railways	Following station
Gateside; Line and station closed	Fife and Kinross Railway	Auchtermuchty; Line and station closed
