= Blairadam railway station =

Disused railway station in Kelty, Fife

Coordinates: 56.1620°N 3.3988°W

Blairadam
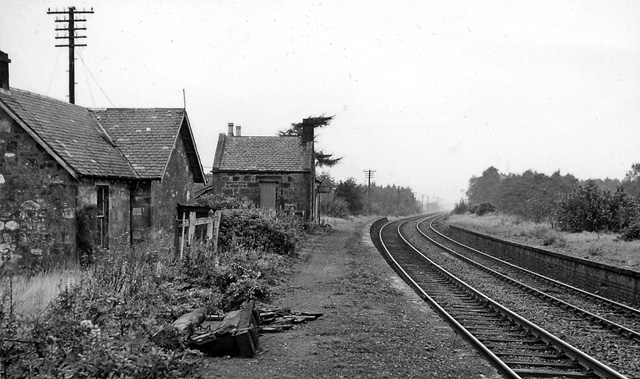
- The site of the station in 1961

General information
- Location: Kelty, Fife; Scotland
- Platforms: 2

Other information
- Status: Disused

History
- Original company: Kinross-shire Railway
- Pre-grouping: North British Railway
- Post-grouping: LNER

Key dates
- 20 June 1860: Opened
- 22 September 1930: Closed to passengers
- 23 March 1964: Closed to goods
Location

Blairadam railway station is a disused station in Fife, Scotland which was open from 1860 to 1964 on the Kinross-shire Railway.

== History ==
The station opened on 20 June 1860 by the North British Railway. To the southwest were sidings and to the south of the northbound platform was the signal box. The station closed on 22 September 1930. The signal box closed in 1957. It closed to goods on 23 March 1964.

Preceding station	Disused railways	Following station
Kelty; Line and station closed	Kinross-shire Railway	Kinross (1860); Line and station closed
