= Auchtermuchty railway station =

Disused railway station in Fife, Scotland

Coordinates: 56.2871°N 3.2255°W

Auchtermuchty
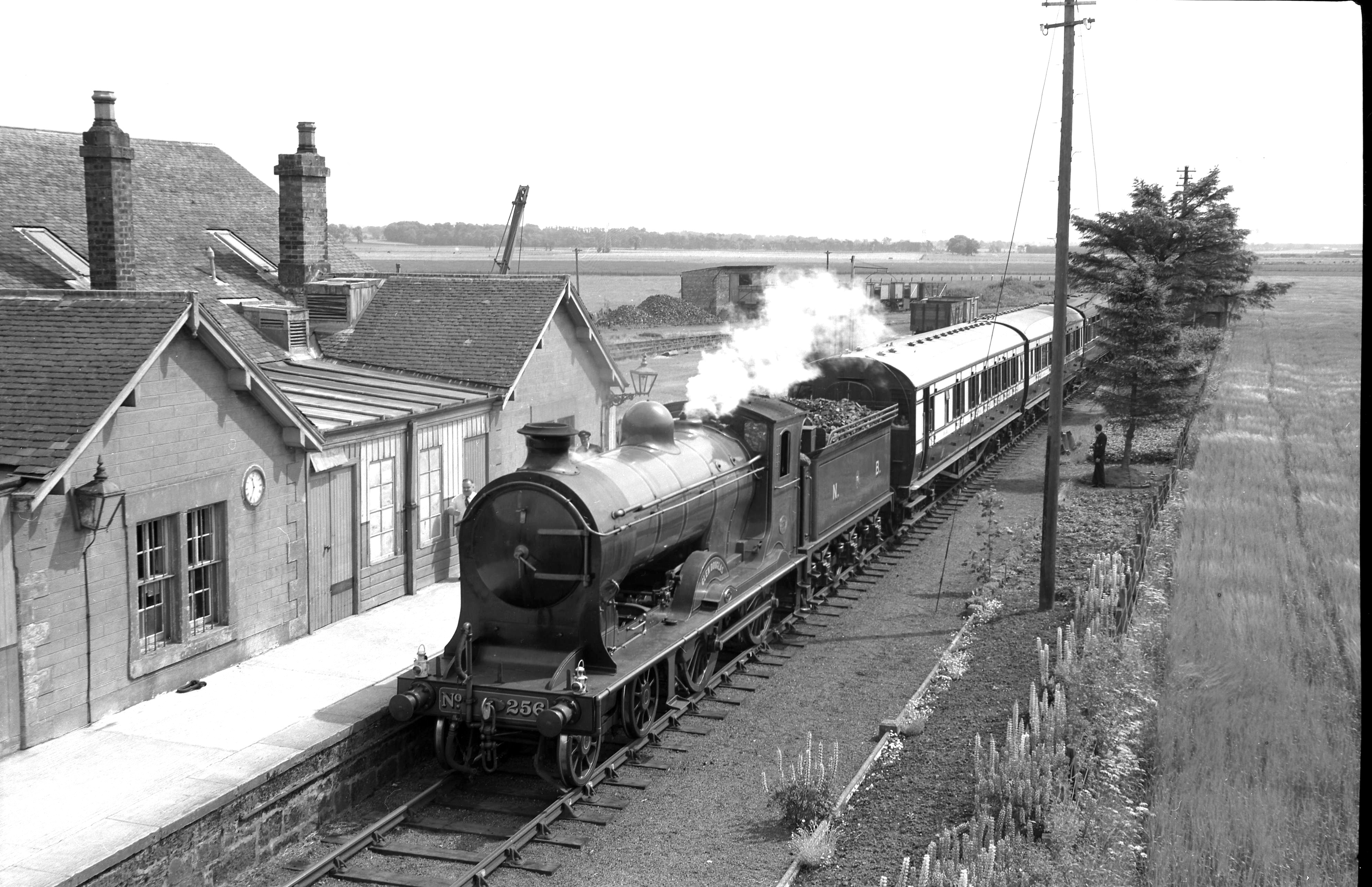
- Auchtermuchty station in 1960

General information
- Location: Auchtermuchty, Fife; Scotland
- Platforms: 1

Other information
- Status: Disused

History
- Original company: Fife and Kinross Railway
- Pre-grouping: North British Railway
- Post-grouping: London and North Eastern Railway

Key dates
- 8 June 1857: Station opens
- 5 June 1950: Station closes
Location

Auchtermuchty railway station served the village of Auchtermuchty, in Fife, Scotland.

== History ==
Opened by the Fife and Kinross Railway, it became part of the North British Railway in 1865, and so into the London and North Eastern Railway. The line then passed on to the Scottish Region of British Railways on nationalisation in 1948. The station was then closed by British Railways.

Preceding station	Disused railways	Following station
Strathmiglo	North British Railway; Fife and Kinross Railway	Ladybank
