= Kelty railway station =

Disused railway station in Kelty, Fife

Kelty

General information
- Location: Kelty, Fife; Scotland
- Coordinates: 56.1387°N 3.3642°W
- Grid reference: NT153948
- Platforms: 2

Other information
- Status: Disused

History
- Original company: Kinross-shire Railway
- Pre-grouping: North British Railway
- Post-grouping: LNER

Key dates
- 20 June 1860: Opened
- 22 September 1930: Closed
Location

Kelty railway station served the village of Kelty, Fife, Scotland from 1860 to 1930 on the Kinross-shire Railway.

== History ==
The station opened on 20 June 1860 by the North British Railway. It had a goods building at one point in its existence. The station closed to passengers on 22 September 1930.

Preceding station	Disused railways	Following station
Cowdenbeath; Line closed, station open	Kinross-shire Railway	Blairadam; Line and station closed
