= Bridge of Earn railway station =

Disused railway station in Bridge of Earn, Perthshire

Bridge of Earn
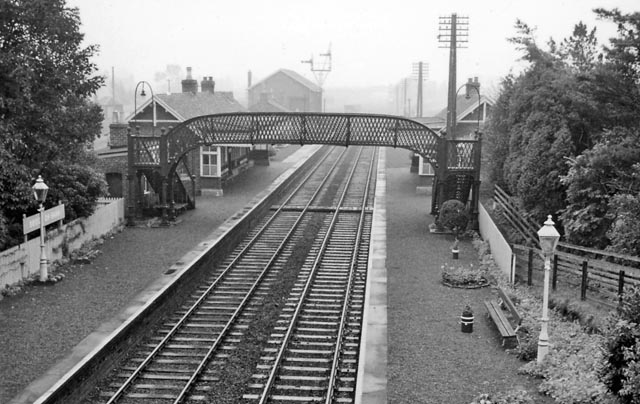
- The station in 1961

General information
- Location: Bridge of Earn, Perthshire; Scotland
- Coordinates: 56.3486°N 3.4122°W
- Grid reference: NO128182
- Platforms: 2

Other information
- Status: Disused

History
- Original company: Edinburgh and Northern Railway
- Pre-grouping: North British Railway
- Post-grouping: LNER; British Railways (Scottish Region)

Key dates
- 18 July 1848: Opened
- 1 February 1892: Closed and relocated
- 15 June 1964: Closed to passengers
- 21 June 1965: Closed to goods
Location

Bridge of Earn railway station served the village of Bridge of Earn, Perthshire, Scotland from 1848 to 1965 on the Edinburgh and Northern Railway.

== History ==
The station opened on 18 July 1848 by the Edinburgh and Northern Railway. It closed on 1 February 1892 so it could be relocated to open lines for Glenfarg and Forth Bridge as it initially only went as far as Ladybank. The old station was demolished in 1902. The second station closed on 15 June 1964 and closed to goods on 21 June 1965.

Preceding station	Historical railways	Following station
Perth (Scotland); Line and station open	North British Railway; Edinburgh and Northern Railway	Abernethy; Line open, station closed
Perth (Scotland); Line and station open	North British Railway; Glenfarg Line	Glenfarg; Line and station closed
