= Balado railway station =

Disused railway station in Scotland

Coordinates: 56.19632°N 3.47574°W

Balado
- Balado railway station in October 1961

General information
- Location: Perth and Kinross; Scotland
- Platforms: 1

Other information
- Status: Disused

History
- Original company: Devon Valley Railway
- Pre-grouping: North British Railway
- Post-grouping: London and North Eastern Railway

Key dates
- 1 August 1863: Station opens as Cleish Road
- June 1878: Station renamed Balado
- 15 June 1964: Station closes
Location

Balado railway station served the villages of Balado and Cleish in the Scottish county of Perth and Kinross. It was located on a line which ran from Alloa railway station to Kinross Junction.

== History ==
Opened by the Devon Valley Railway, it became part of the North British Railway and so into the London and North Eastern Railway. The line then passed on to the Scottish Region of British Railways on nationalisation in 1948. The station was then closed by the British Railways Board.

== The site today ==
Part of the platform still remains.

== Bibliography ==
- R. V. J. Butt (1995). The Directory of Railway Stations. Patrick Stephens Ltd. ISBN 1-85260-508-1
- A. Jowett (2000). Jowett's Nationalised Railway Atlas. Atlantic Publishing. ISBN 0-906899-99-0

Preceding station	Historical railways	Following station
Crook of Devon	North British Railway; Devon Valley Railway	Kinross Junction
