= Kinross Junction railway station =

Disused railway station in Kinross, Perth and Kinross

Coordinates: 56.2081°N 3.4330°W

Kinross Junction
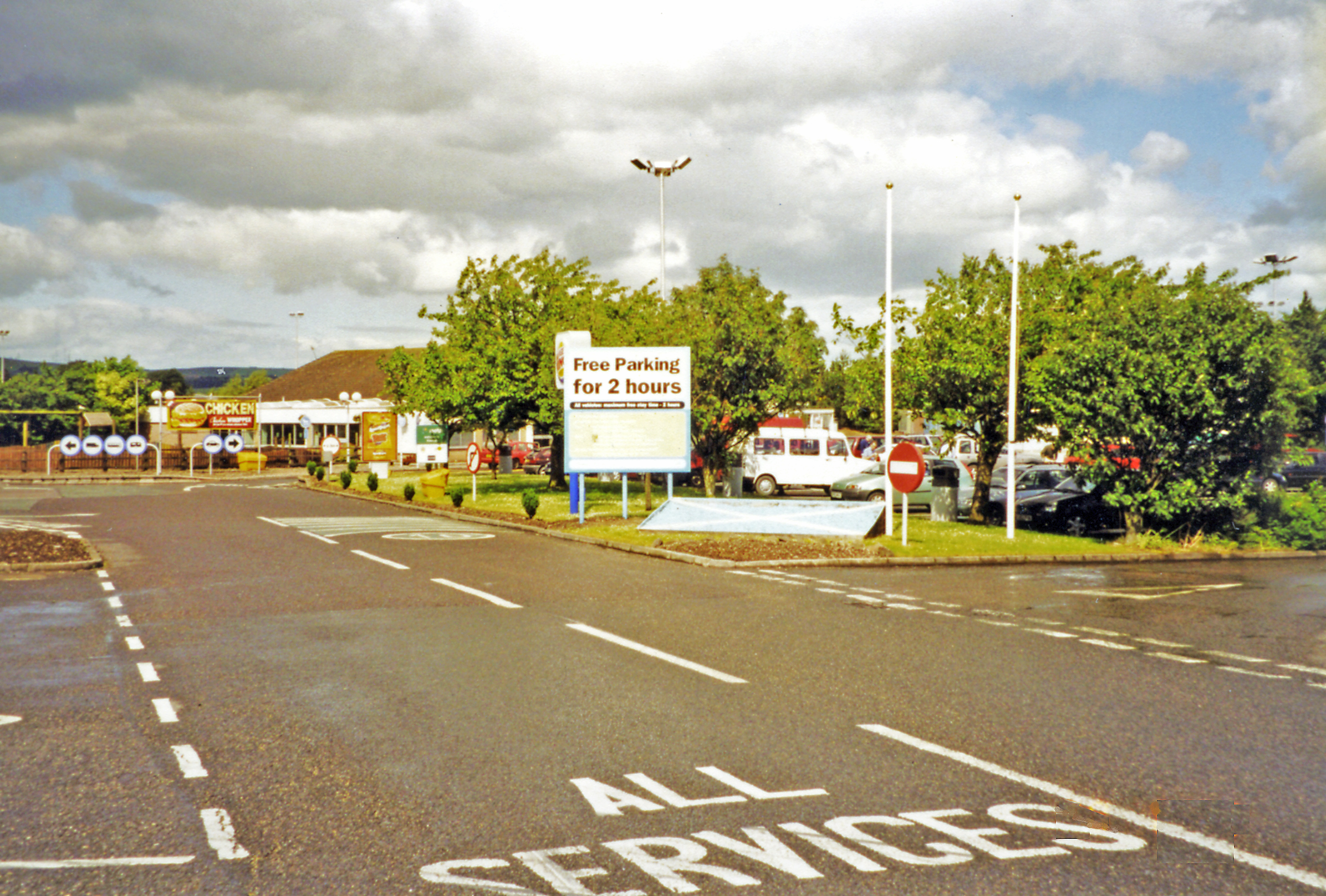
- The site of the station in 2002

General information
- Location: Kinross, Perth and Kinross; Scotland
- Platforms: 1

Other information
- Status: Disused

History
- Original company: North British Railway
- Pre-grouping: North British Railway
- Post-grouping: London and North Eastern Railway; British Rail (Scottish Region)

Key dates
- 20 August 1858: First station opened as Kinross
- 1860: First station closed and second station opened as Hopefield
- 1 October 1871: Name changed to Kinross Junction
- 1890: Relocated
- 5 January 1970: Closed
Location

Kinross Junction railway station served the burgh of Kinross, Perth and Kinross, Scotland from 1860 to 1970 on the Fife and Kinross Railway.

== History ==
The first station opened as Kinross on 20 August 1858 by the North British Railway. It closed in 1860 but a second station opened in the same year as Hopefield. It was renamed Kinross Junction on 1 October 1871 when the Devon Valley Railway opened. It was closed and resited 200 yards (180 m) north in 1890. The signal box was to the south. It replaced the north signal box, which was burned down in the 1890s. The station closed on 5 January 1970.

Preceding station	Disused railways	Following station
Loch Leven; Line and station closed	Fife and Kinross Railway	Milnathort; Line and station closed
Balado; Line and station closed	North British Railway; Devon Valley Railway	Terminus
