= Rumbling Bridge railway station =

Disused railway station in Rumbling Bridge, Kinross-shire

Rumbling Bridge
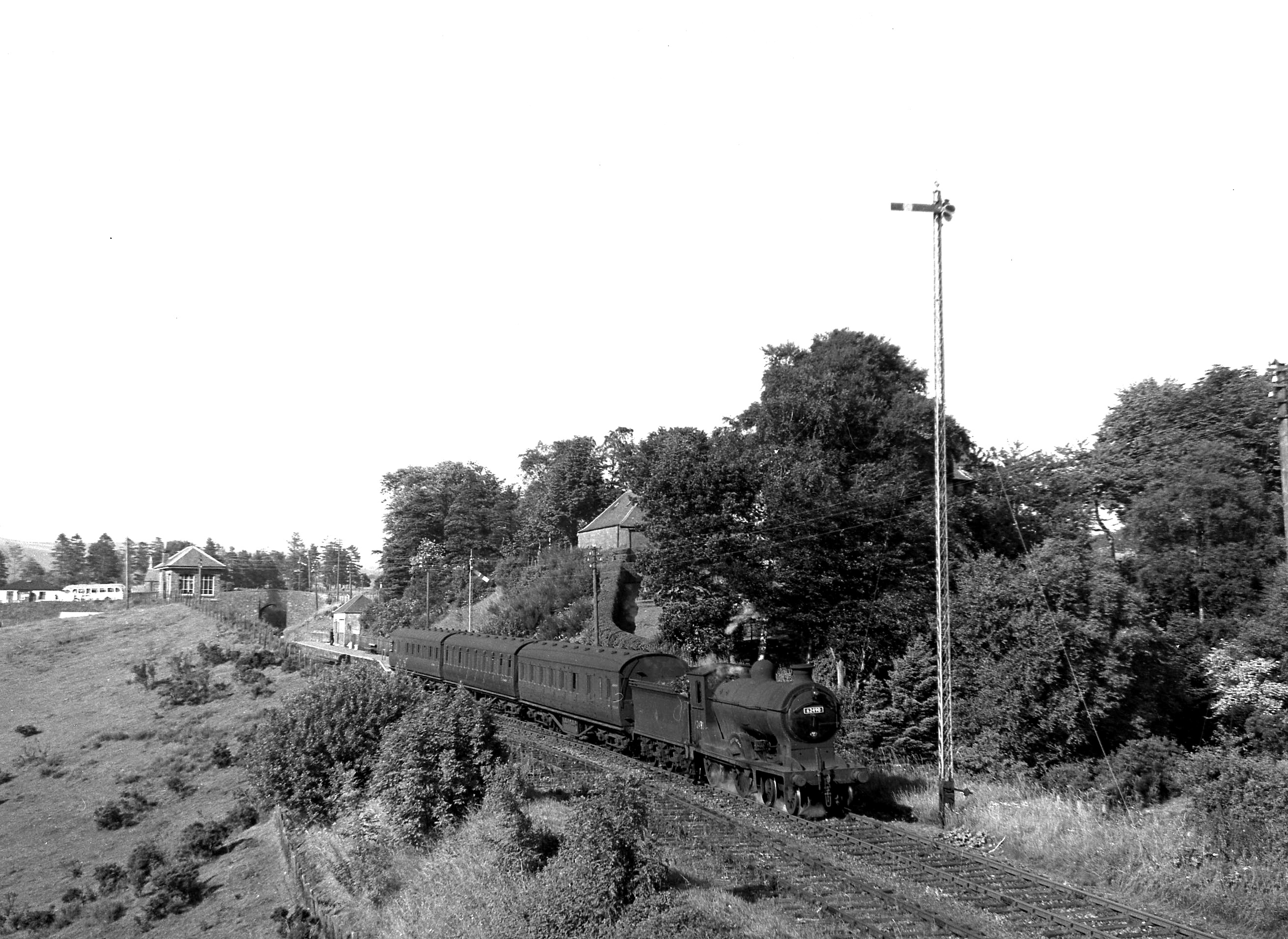
- A train leaving the station in 1957

General information
- Location: Rumbling Bridge, Kinross-shire; Scotland
- Coordinates: 56.1762°N 3.5834°W
- Grid reference: NT018993
- Platforms: 2

Other information
- Status: Disused

History
- Original company: Devon Valley Railway
- Pre-grouping: North British Railway
- Post-grouping: LNER; British Railways (Scottish Region)

Key dates
- 1 May 1863: Opened
- 1 October 1868: Closed
- 1 October 1870: Reopened and relocated
- 15 June 1964: Closed

Rumbling Bridge railway station served the village of Rumbling Bridge, Kinross-shire, Scotland from 1863 to 1964 on the Devon Valley Railway.

== History ==
The station opened on 1 May 1863 by the Devon Valley Railway. It opened as a terminus until the line to the east was completed. It closed on 1 October 1868 but was later relocated to the west and reopened on 1 October 1870. To the west was the goods yard and to the south was the signal box. The station closed to both passengers and goods traffic on 15 June 1964.

Preceding station	Disused railways	Following station
Dollar; Line and station closed	Devon Valley Railway	Crook of Devon; Line and station closed
