= Gateside railway station =

Disused railway station in Gateside, Fife

Gateside

General information
- Location: Gateside, Fife; Scotland
- Coordinates: 56.2655°N 3.3206°W
- Grid reference: NO183089
- Platforms: 1

Other information
- Status: Disused

History
- Original company: North British Railway
- Pre-grouping: North British Railway
- Post-grouping: LNER; British Railways (Scottish Region)

Key dates
- 15 March 1858: Opened
- 5 June 1950: Closed
Location

Gateside railway station served the village of Gateside, Fife, Scotland from 1858 to 1950 on the Fife and Kinross Railway.

== History ==
The station opened on 15 March 1858 by the North British Railway. It was a single platform station with a station building at the east end, next to a road over bridge. The platform was on the south side of the single track line. The station house is now a private house.

Preceding station	Disused railways	Following station
Mawcarse; Line and station closed	Fife and Kinross Railway	Strathmiglo; Line and station closed
