= Milnathort railway station =

Disused railway station in Milnathort, Perth and Kinross

Milnathort

General information
- Location: Milnathort, Perth and Kinross; Scotland
- Coordinates: 56.2213°N 3.4239°W
- Grid reference: NO118044
- Platforms: 2

Other information
- Status: Disused

History
- Original company: North British Railway
- Pre-grouping: North British Railway
- Post-grouping: LNER; British Railways (Scottish Region)

Key dates
- 15 March 1858: Opened
- 15 June 1964: Closed
Location

Milnathort railway station served the town of Milnathort, Perth and Kinross, Scotland, from 1858 to 1964 on the Fife and Kinross Railway.

== History ==
The station opened on 15 March 1858 by the North British Railway. To the north was the goods yard which had a goods shed and a siding which served Orwell Vale Mill. A signal box opened in 1890 which was situated to the northeast. There was initially a locomotive shed to the east which was later removed and a goods yard to the south which was later replaced. The station closed on 15 June 1964.

Preceding station	Disused railways	Following station
Kinross Junction; Line and station closed	Fife and Kinross Railway	Mawcarse; Line and station closed
