= Dollar railway station =

Closed railway station that served the village of Dollar, Clackmannanshire

Dollar
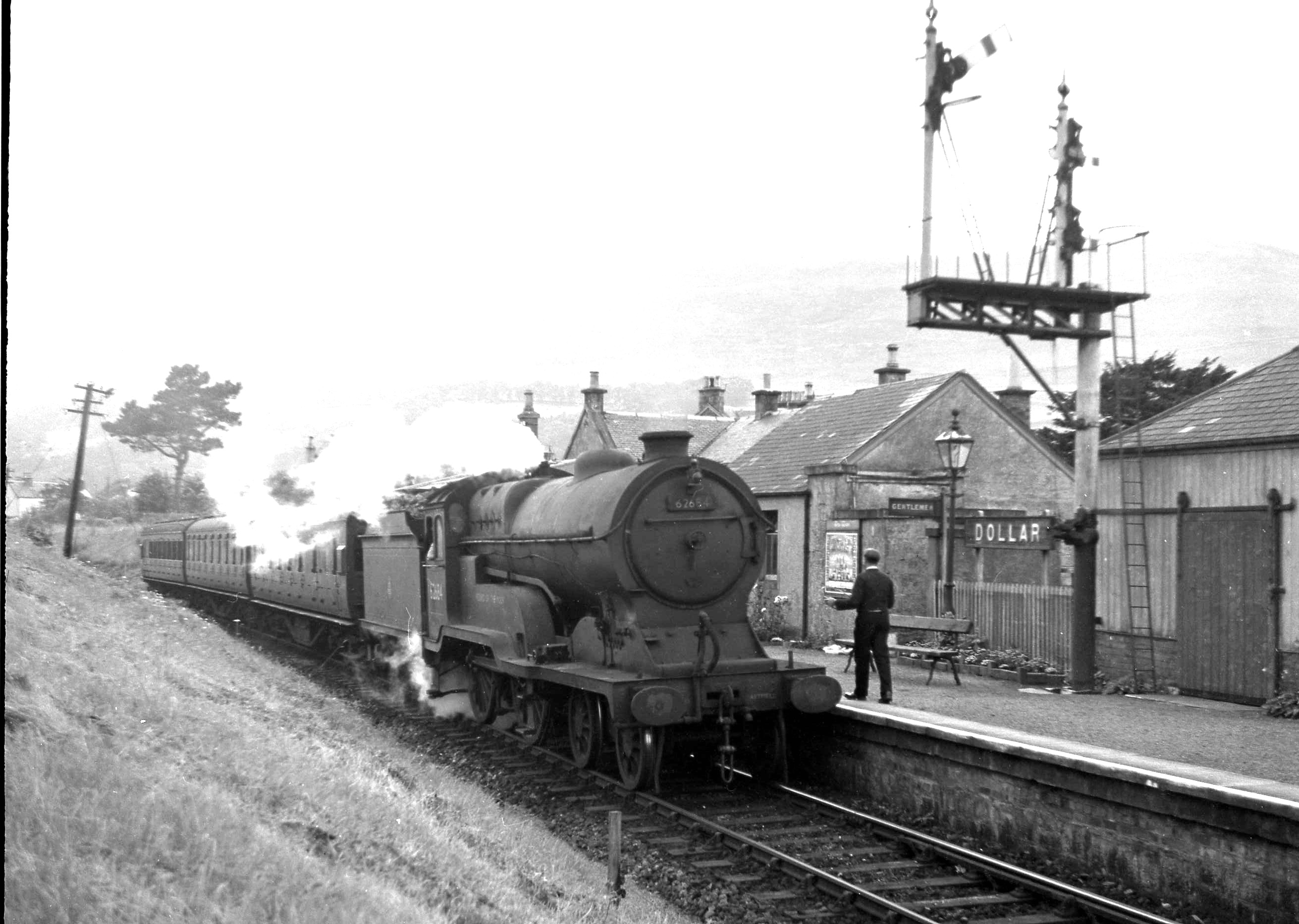
- The station in 1957

General information
- Location: Dollar, Clackmannanshire; Scotland
- Coordinates: 56.16032°N 3.6723485°W
- Platforms: 1

Other information
- Status: Disused

History
- Opened: 3 May 1869
- Closed: 15 June 1964
- Original company: Devon Valley Railway
- Pre-grouping: North British Railway
- Post-grouping: LNER; British Railways (Scottish Region)
Location

Dollar railway station served the village of Dollar, Clackmannanshire, Scotland from 1869 to 1964 on the Devon Valley Railway.

== History ==
The station opened on 3 May 1869 by the Devon Valley Railway. To the northeast was the goods yard and to the southeast was the signal box. To the east was Dollar Mine, which provided coal for Kincardine Power Station. The station closed to both passengers and goods traffic on 15 June 1964.

Preceding station	Disused railways	Following station
Tillicoultry; Line and station closed	Devon Valley Railway	Rumbling Bridge; Line and station closed
