= Kinross (1860) railway station =

Temporary terminus in Kinross, Perth and Kinross

Coordinates: 56°11′49″N 3°25′19″W

Kinross

General information
- Location: Kinross, Perth and Kinross; Scotland
- Platforms: 2

Other information
- Status: Disused

History
- Original company: Kinross-shire Railway

Key dates
- 20 June 1860: Opened
- 20 September 1860: Closed
Location

Kinross railway station was a temporary terminus that served the burgh of Kinross, Perth and Kinross, Scotland in 1860 on the Kinross-shire Railway.

== History ==
The station opened on 20 June 1860 by the North British Railway. It was a temporary terminus, closing on 20 September 1860 when the line was extended.

Preceding station	Disused railways	Following station
Blairadam; Line and station closed	Kinross-shire Railway	Terminus
