= Mawcarse railway station =

Disused railway station in Milnathort, Perth and Kinross

Mawcarse

General information
- Location: Mawcarse, Perth and Kinross; Scotland
- Coordinates: 56.2397°N 3.368°W
- Grid reference: NO153060
- Platforms: 2

Other information
- Status: Disused

History
- Original company: North British Railway
- Pre-grouping: North British Railway
- Post-grouping: LNER; British Railways (Scottish Region)

Key dates
- 15 March 1858: Opened
- 1890: Rebuilt and name changed to Mawcarse Junction
- 1962: Name reverted to Mawcarse
- 15 June 1964: Closed
Location

Mawcarse railway station served the hamlet of Mawcarse, Perth and Kinross, Scotland from 1858 to 1964 on the Fife and Kinross Railway.

== History ==
The station opened on 15 March 1858 by the North British Railway. It was rebuilt in 1890 and opened as Mawcarse Junction when the Glenfarg Line opened. The signal box opened around this time and was to the west of the station. To the north was the goods yard which had a saw mill siding. The station's name was changed back to Mawcarse in 1962. It closed on 15 June 1964.

Preceding station	Disused railways	Following station
Milnathort; Line and station closed	Fife and Kinross Railway	Gateside; Line and station closed
Terminus	Glenfarg Line	Glenfarg; Line and station closed
