= Tillicoultry railway station =

Disused railway station in Tillicoultry, Clackmannanshire

Tillicoultry

General information
- Location: Tillicoultry, Clackmannanshire; Scotland
- Coordinates: 56.1503°N 3.74°W
- Grid reference: NS920966
- Platforms: 1; 2 (later added)

Other information
- Status: Disused

History
- Original company: Devon Valley Railway
- Pre-grouping: North British Railway
- Post-grouping: London and North Eastern Railway; British Railways (Scottish Region)

Key dates
- 22 December 1851: Opened
- 15 June 1964: Closed
Location

Tillicoultry railway station served the town of Tillicoultry, Clackmannanshire, Scotland from 1851 to 1964 on the Devon Valley Railway and the Stirling and Dunfermline Railway.

== History ==
The station opened on 22 December 1851 by the Devon Valley Railway. To the south west were coal pits, being served by Alloa Waggonway. To the south was the signal box. To the north was a goods station, which had a turntable, a loading bank and a shed. The station was originally a terminus until the stations to the east opened. Another platform was added in 1904 as well as a new signal box to the north, replacing the original one. The station closed to both passengers and goods traffic on 15 June 1964. The signal box closed in 1967.

Preceding station	Disused railways	Following station
Glenfoot; Line and station closed	Devon Valley Railway	Dollar; Line and station closed
