= Sterling Furniture =

Scottish furniture retailer

Sterling Furniture Group Ltd
- The Tillicoultry flagship store, a converted 19th-century mill
- Type: Private
- Industry: Retail
- Founded: 1973
- Founder: George Knowles
- Headquarters: Tillicoultry, Scotland, UK
- Number of locations: 9 stores
- Area served: Scotland (stores); United Kingdom (online)
- Products: Furniture, flooring, homewares
- Website: sterlinghome.co.uk

Sterling Home is a family-owned furniture retailer headquartered in Tillicoultry, Clackmannanshire, Scotland. The company operates nine stores across Scotland, with its flagship store in Tillicoultry and further stores in Aberdeen, Dunfermline, Edinburgh, Elgin, Glasgow (two stores), Montrose and Uddingston.

== History ==
The company was founded in 1973 by Stirling-based furniture retailer George Knowles, who based its concept on the out-of-town retail developments which had been successful in the United States. He bought and converted the disused Devonvale Mill in Tillicoultry, which opened as a Sterling showroom in 1974, making it the largest furniture showroom in Scotland at the time. The mill itself was built in 1840.

Knowles later expanded the complex to include a 'Homestore Outlet' and garden centre, and was involved in the development of the Sterling Mills outlet centre on land opposite the original furniture warehouse, which was formerly the base of Marshall Construction.

The company's television advertisements, starring football commentator Dougie Donnelly, became part of Scottish popular culture, together with the phrase "Tillicoultry, near Stirling" (although Tillicoultry is around 10 miles east of Stirling).

After the death of George Knowles' son in 2003, Gordon Mearns took over the running of the company. A £500,000 extension to the Tillicoultry store added 10,000 square feet of retail space; at that time the company employed more than 500 staff across eight stores.

Between 2015 and 2021 the Edinburgh store traded under the Martin & Frost name before reverting to the Sterling brand.

In 2016, Sterling acquired Forrest Furnishing, an independent furniture store on South Street in Glasgow's west end that had traded since the 1940s. The store was rebranded as Sterling Home in December 2025.

A BoConcept concession opened within the Tillicoultry store in November 2021.

In 2025 the company completed a multi-million-pound refurbishment of the Tillicoultry store, described by the company as its most significant in 50 years. The store covers around 250,000 square feet and includes an outlet, garden centre and café. The company describes the store as the largest family-owned furniture store in the United Kingdom.

== Stores ==
As of 2026 Sterling Home operates stores in Tillicoultry (flagship), Aberdeen (Bridge of Don), Dunfermline, Edinburgh (Fort Kinnaird), Elgin, Glasgow (London Road and South Street), Montrose and Uddingston.

== See also ==
- Furniture Village
