= Tillicoultry =

Town in Clackmannanshire, Scotland

Coordinates: 56.153°N 3.742°W

Tillicoultry: Scottish Gaelic: Tulach Cultaire, Tulach Cultraidh; Scots: Tillicoultry, Tilly
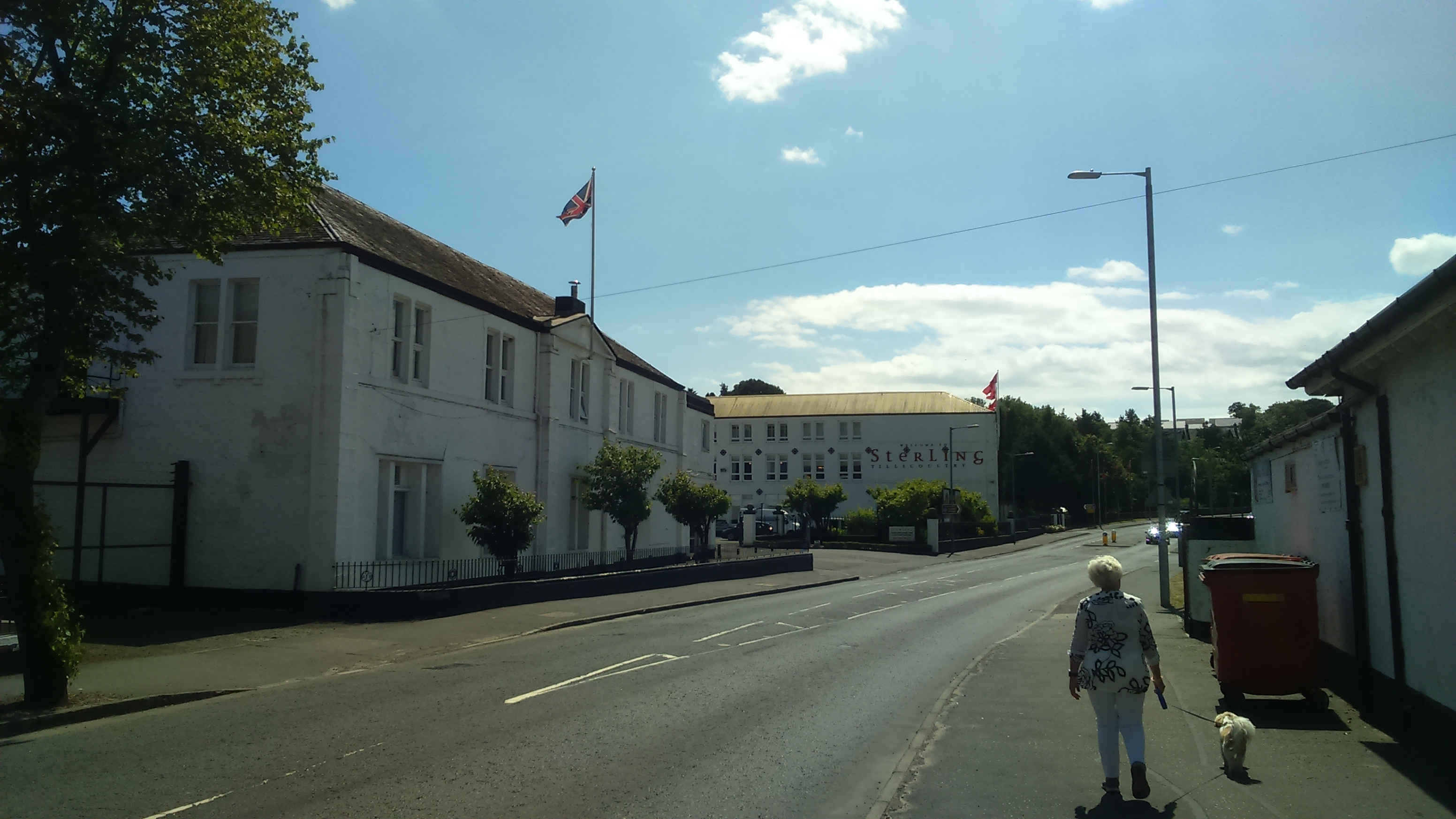

- Location within Clackmannanshire
- Population: 4,620 (2020)
- OS grid reference: NS9180696986
  - Edinburgh: 25 mi (40 km)
  - London: 353 mi (568 km)
- Council area: Clackmannanshire
- Lieutenancy area: Clackmannanshire
- Country: Scotland
- Sovereign state: United Kingdom
- Post town: Tillicoultry
- Postcode district: FK13
- Dialling code: 01259
- Police: Scotland
- Fire: Scottish
- Ambulance: Scottish
- UK Parliament: Alloa and Grangemouth
- Scottish Parliament: Clackmannanshire and Dunblane

Tillicoultry (/ˌtɪliˈkuːtri/ TIL-ee-KOO-tree; Scottish Gaelic: Tulach Cultraidh, perhaps from older Gaelic Tullich-cul-tir, or "the mount/hill at the back of the country") is a town in Clackmannanshire, Scotland. Tillicoultry is usually referred to as Tilly by the locals.

One of the Hillfoots Villages on the A91, which runs from Stirling to St. Andrews, Tillicoultry is situated at the southern base of the Ochil Hills, which provide a spectacular backdrop. The River Devon lies to the south. The river also runs through neighbouring villages Dollar and Alva to the east and west respectively. The former mining village of Coalsnaughton lies just south, whilst Alloa lies 4 miles (6 kilometres) southwest.

The "hill" referred to in the first etymology is likely to be Kirkhill, at the east of the town. The alternative Latin etymology, Tellus culta, the cultivated land, suggested by Rev. William Osborne, minister of the parish from 1773 to 1794, is also possible. However, as both etymologies could equally be applied to many places in Scotland, both are suspect, as neither define the town in a unique manner.

== History ==
The estate of Tillicoultry was taken from Aleumus de Meser in 1261 by Alexander III for failure to render due feudal services. The estate had originally been received by de Meser's father, also Aleumus, from Alexander II. It was then granted to William Count of Mar and remained in possession of the Mar, and then by marriage of Margaret, Countess of Mar, to William Douglas, 1st Earl of Douglas, the Douglas family until 1483, when it changed hands to the ancestors of Lord Colville of Culross. By 1634 it was sold to Sir William Alexander of Menstrie (later, 1st Earl of Stirling). Between 1644 and 1840, ownership of the estate changed hands frequently.

The origins of the village lie in the Westertown (previously Cairnstown) area, where the road to Stirling crossed the Tillicoultry Burn. It is thought that the centre of Westertown was probably in the area now known as Shillinghill.

There are records of a Parish church existing in Tillicoultry from 1639, and knowledge of cloth manufacture dating from the 1560s. Traces of a Druid circle, sixty feet in diameter, were found in the eastern area of the parish at the end of the 18th century. A Pictish fortress stood upon the Castle Craig, near the current site of Craigfoot Quarry on Wood Hill, to the west of Tillicoultry Glen. This has long since been ruined, however legend has it that the stone of the fortress was employed in the building of Stirling Castle.

Due to the rapid growth of the village during the 19th century, there were problems with overcrowding, poor housing, high infant mortality, water supply and drainage. In an attempt to address these problems, Tillicoultry Burgh was created in 1871. It lasted until 1975 when it disappeared as a result of local government reorganisation.

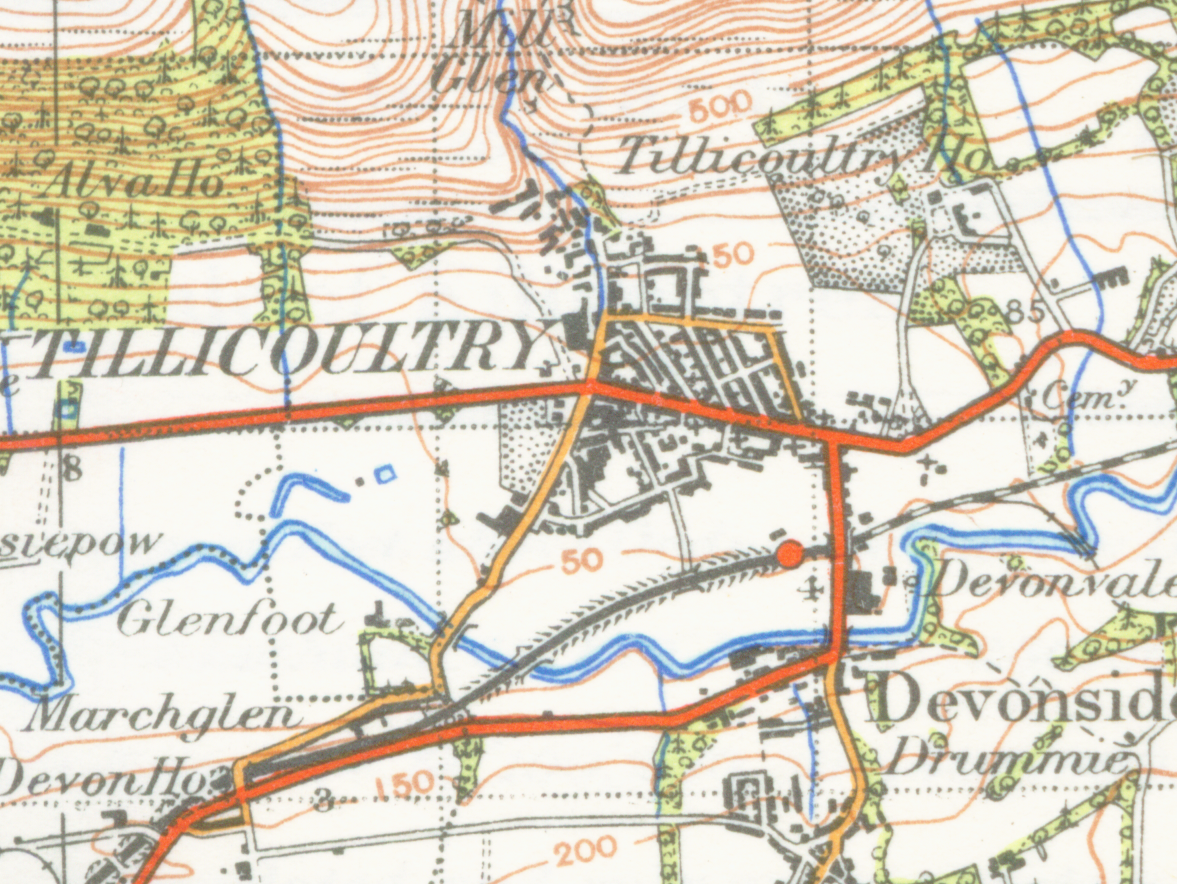
A map of Tillicoultry from 1945

Around 1930, one of the first bus stations in the country was built at Murray Square to serve the eight bus services which terminated in the town. The original glass and cast iron shelters were replaced by modern shelters some time ago. Despite the growth in car ownership and the corresponding decline in public transport, Tillicoultry, and indeed all the Hillfoots villages, retain a regular bus service.

The old Harviestoun estate, where Archibald Tait (1811–82), Archbishop of Canterbury, spent much of his boyhood, lies East-North-East of the village. Robert Burns visited the estate in the summer of 1787, during his stay he wrote The Banks of the Devon and Fairest Maid on Devon Banks. A commemorative cairn at the roadside, near the east lodge to Harviestoun, marks this event.

=== Industry ===
The burn which runs off the Ochils and down through the glen into west of the village provided an attractive source of water for the early textile industry in Tillicoultry, being used for the washing and dying of wool. During the early 18th century a cloth known as Tillicoultry Serge was manufactured by weaving worsted with linen.

By the time of the Industrial Revolution the burn was a recognised source of power, with the first mill being established in the 1790s. Many more textile mills were built along the burnside, by the 1830s, steam powered mills were introduced and by 1870 there were 12 mills employing over 2000 people. As the industry expanded, more workers were attracted to the village. The population of the parish, which had stood less than 1,000 at the turn of the 19th century, had grown to over 4,500 by the early 1850s.

Textile mills and coal mines remained the biggest employers of the local population until the first half of the 20th century. In the 1950s the most recent colliery to be worked, on the south bank of the River Devon, set new productivity records due to a high level of mechanisation. Its impressive adit entrance, now safely bricked up, can still be seen. In 1851, due to the importance of Tillicoultry as an industrial centre, it became the first Hillfoots village to have a rail connection.

In 1921 Samuel Jones Limited established a paper mill at Devonvale, the current site of Sterling Furniture. In 1926, 33 people were employed at the site and the firm returned its first profit. By 1936, 238 staff were employed by the company. Sydney Platfoot was appointed Managing Director of the Devonvale works in 1922, he later went on to become town provost from 1930 to 1936. In 1964, the company merged with Wiggins Teape and by 1967 employed a fifth of the working population.

Tillicoultry Quarries Ltd, as the name suggests, was established in 1930 by R.W. Menzies at Craigfoot Quarry Tillicoultry, and remains 100% owned by the Menzies family. Quarrying no longer takes places in Tillicoultry; the company's Head office is based in nearby Kincardine.

Quartz-dolerite was first extracted in 1930 from the now inoperative Craigfoot Quarry (map), however quarrying had taken place on a smaller scale at the site since 1880. On 26 January 1949 the quarry was the site of a tragic explosion when a magazine containing 150 lb of explosive detonated killing quarryman Alexander Honeyman and blowing out doors and windows in the Shillinghill and Upper Mill Street area.

=== The flood of 1877 ===
Following a particularly wet summer and torrential rainfall over a 12-hour period, Tillicoultry Burn burst its banks on the morning of 28 August 1877. Flooding was widespread throughout Strathdevon, both Alloa Railway station and Alloa Brewery were submerged, crops were destroyed around Tullibody and there was extensive property damage in Dollar also. The Alloa Advertiser described the rainfall as 'not simply heavy rain; it was a terrific downpour- persistent, incessant, it fell in bucketfuls- to use our expressive vernacular it came down like "hale water"'.

Workers in mills to the west side of the burn were trapped in their workplaces, unable to cross Mill Street due to the flood water. By breakfast time the houses and shops of High Street were under three feet of water.

Three people, Castle Mill owner William Hutchison, dyer William Stillie and Isabella Miller, a young factory worker, were swept away when the bridge on which they were standing collapsed into the flood waters. The collapse was probably due to the impact of water-borne debris upon the embankment on which the foundation of the bridge stood. Both William Hutchison and Isabella Miller perished in the torrent, however William Stillie was rescued further downstream. Despite exhaustive searches, Isabella Miller's body was not recovered for several days. It was eventually discovered at Glenfoot, where the burn joins the River Devon.

The village was deprived of water and gas supplies for a week following the flood. The cost of repairs to the Burnside amounted to £2,000.

== The village today ==
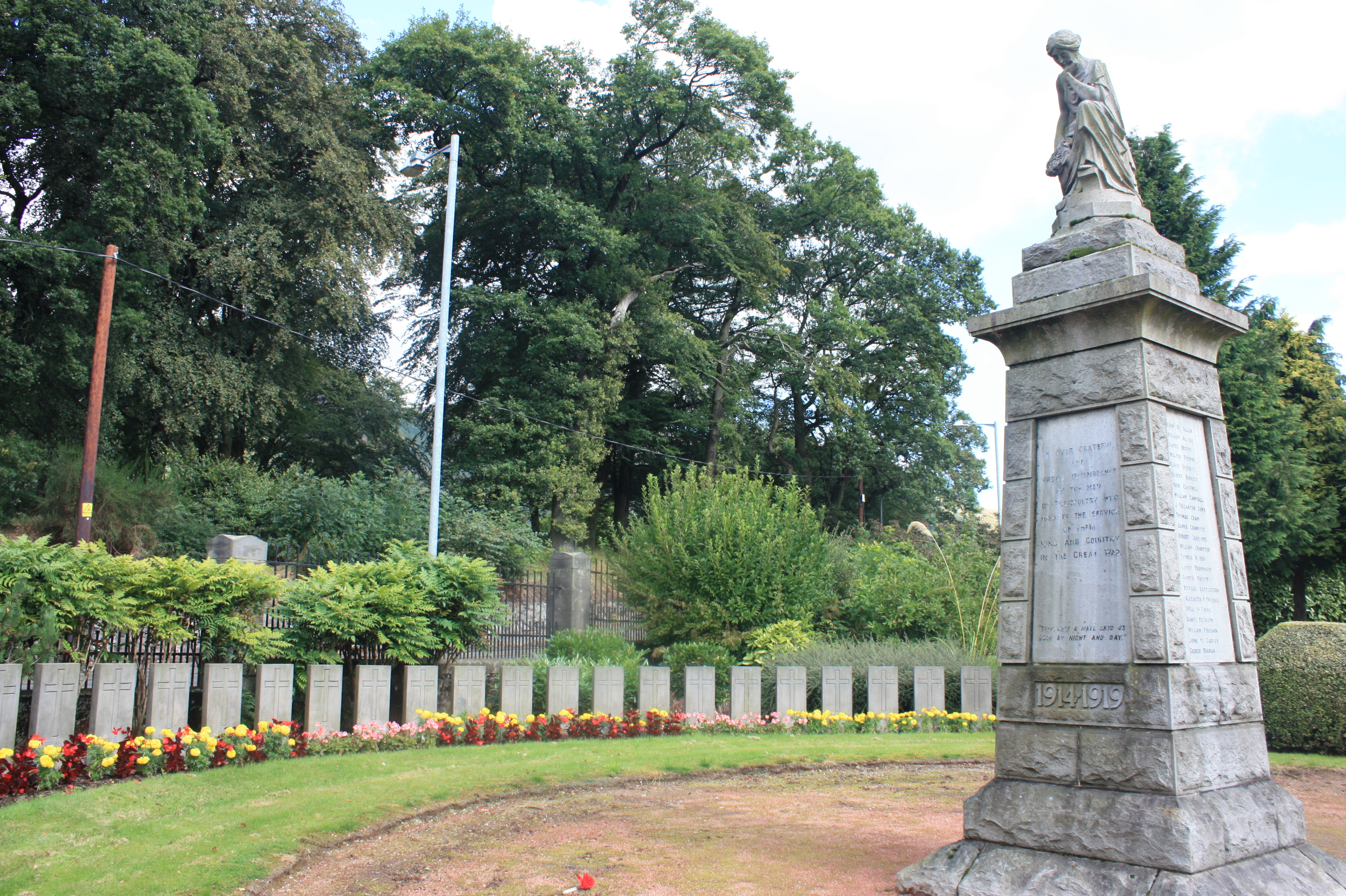
Tillicoultry War Memorial: a traditional figure on a plinth for WW1 but surrounded by a series of individual stones, in a henge style, by Pilkington Jackson added in 1949 for those lost in WW2

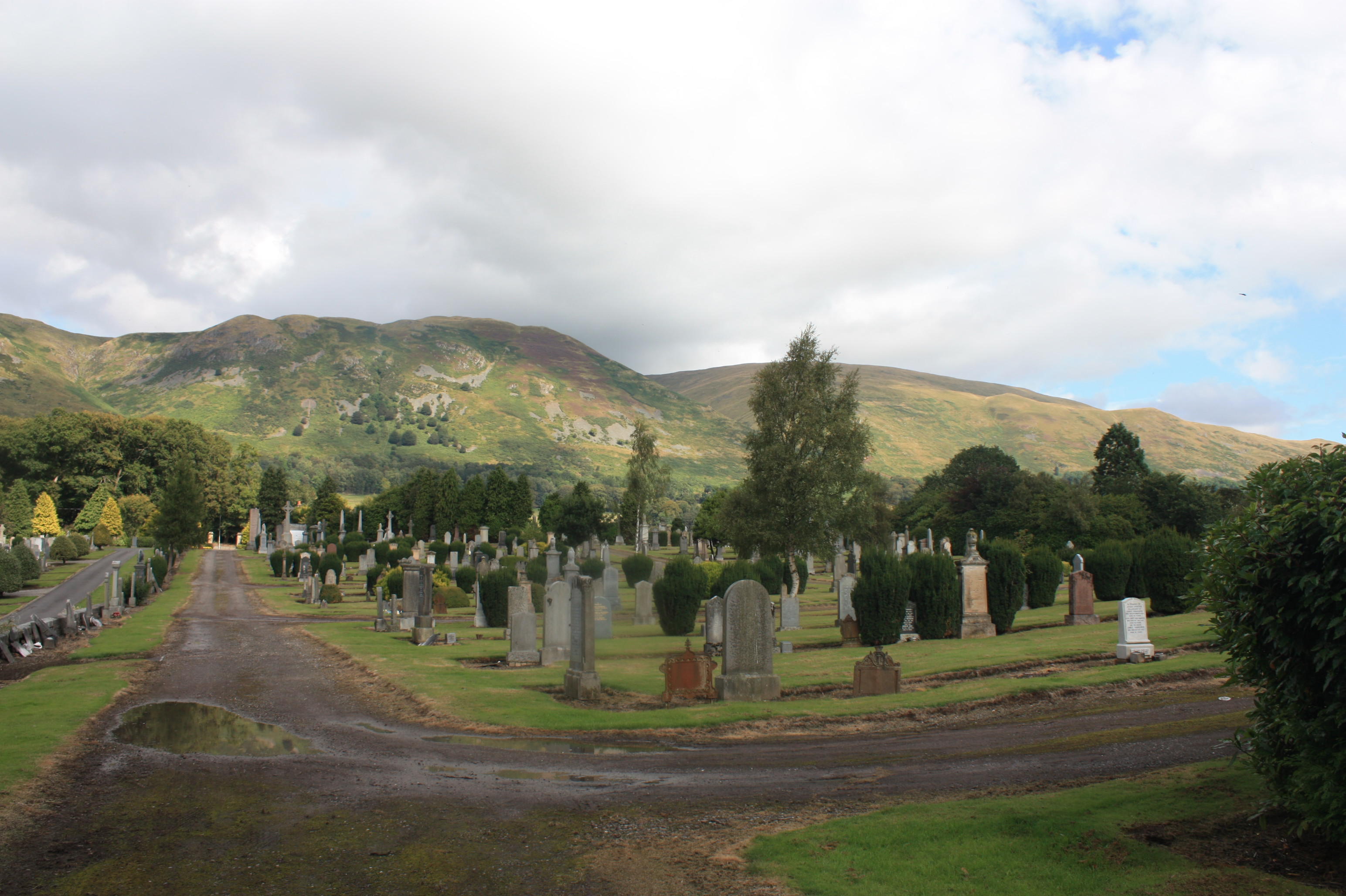
The cemetery in Tillicoultry with the Ochil Hills behind

As the textile and coal mining industries declined, Tillicoultry became a popular commuter town. Many of the mill buildings have been converted into residential accommodation. Tillicoultry railway station, on the Devon Valley Railway was situated opposite Devonvale Hall, and closed in 1964.

The Clock Mill, built by James and George Walker of Galashiels, is situated at the top of Upper Mill Street. The last production of textiles in the mill was by D. C. Sinclair & Son. They wove high quality mohair goods among others. It was turned into a museum, then a business centre and now residential flats.

The village developed on a herring-bone pattern north of the main road. A series of diagonal streets, mostly lined with cottages, lie between the High Street and Walker Terrace, which run parallel. The eastern area of the village has more recent residential developments, dating from the 1940s to the present.

Tillicoultry is perhaps now best known for its large retail outlet, Sterling Furniture, based in the former Devonvale paper mill complex, as well as for the adjacent Sterling Mills shopping centre.

The Devon Way walkway links eastward to Dollar.

The village also has a 400-pupil Primary School, which is situated next to the Fir Park artificial ski slope. For secondary school aged children, the closest school is Alva Academy.

== Notable people ==
- Captain J D Pollock, a First World War soldier awarded the Victoria Cross, was born in the village.
- Major J L Dawson, awarded the Victoria Cross in the same action as Pollock, was also born in the village. Dawson and Pollock were second cousins.
- Professor Sir Hector Hetherington (1888–1965) philosopher buried here, with his son Alastair Hetherington (1919–1999), editor of the Guardian, buried beside him.
- Steven Miller, who plays Lenny Lyons in the TV series Casualty.
- Sam Fisher, professional footballer who plays for Dundee.
