= Devon Valley Railway =

Former railway line in Scotland

Overview
- Locale: Scotland
- Termini: 1851

Technical
- Track gauge: 4 ft 8 1/2 in (1,435 mm)

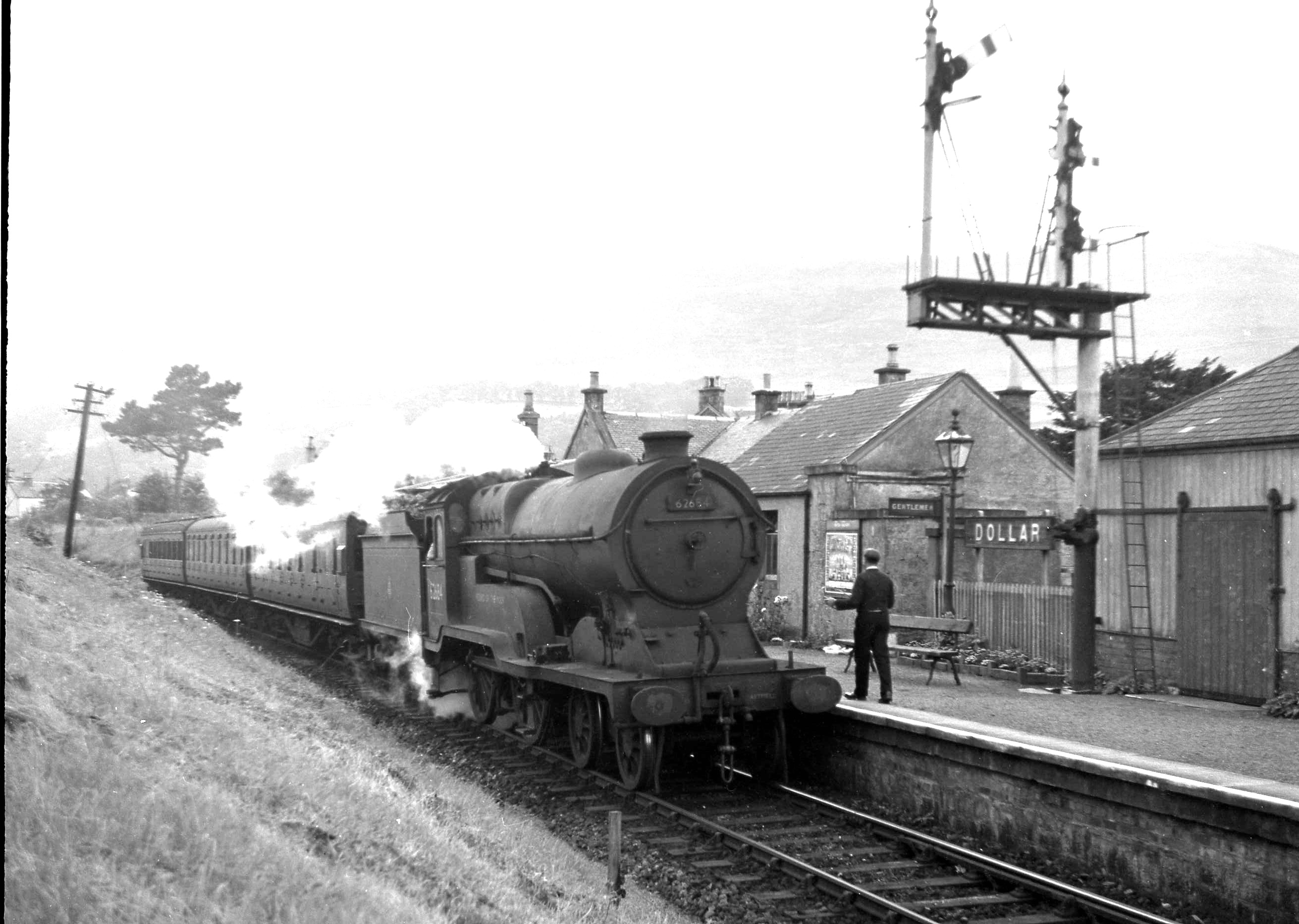
Locomotive number 62684 at Dollar Station in 1957

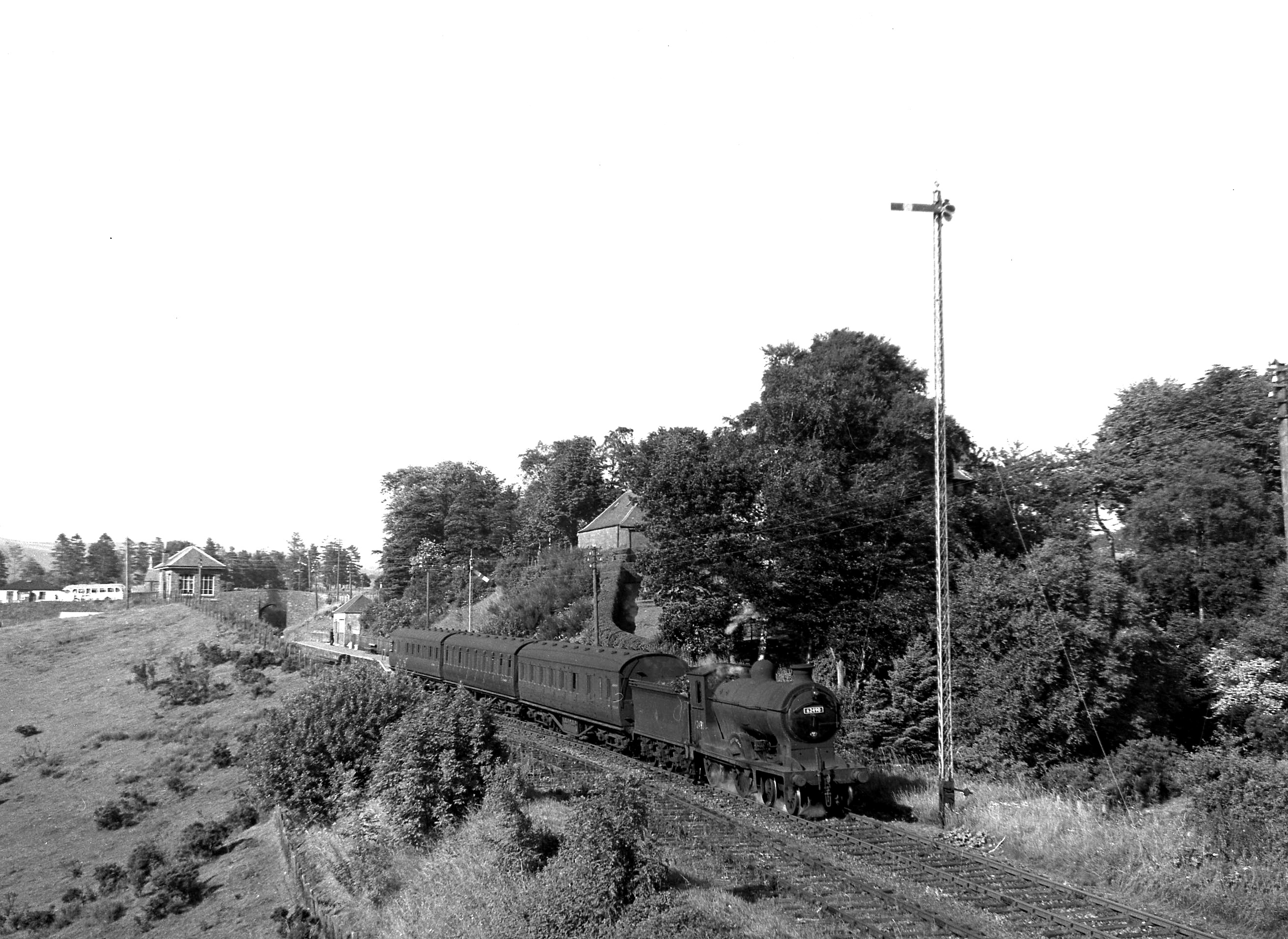
Locomotive number 62490 leaving Rumbling Bridge Station in 1957

The Devon Valley Railway linked Alloa and Kinross in central Scotland, along a route following the valley of the River Devon. Its construction took 20 years from the first section opening in 1851, to the final section in 1871. Three railway companies were involved, and it encountered a great many problems both with finance and engineering.

The line provided the missing link of a secondary route from the River Clyde to the River Tay by joining the Stirling and Dunfermline Railway with the Fife and Kinross Railway. Leaving the main Stirling to Dunfermline line at Alloa, other stations were built at Sauchie, Tillicoultry, Dollar, Rumbling Bridge, Crook of Devon, Balado and Kinross, where it joined the main Perth to Edinburgh line The railway was independent but worked by the North British Railway until 1875 when it was absorbed by the major company. In 1923 following the grouping it became part of LNER then, following nationalisation in 1947, was taken over by British Railways. The line closed to passengers in 1964 and to all traffic in 1973.

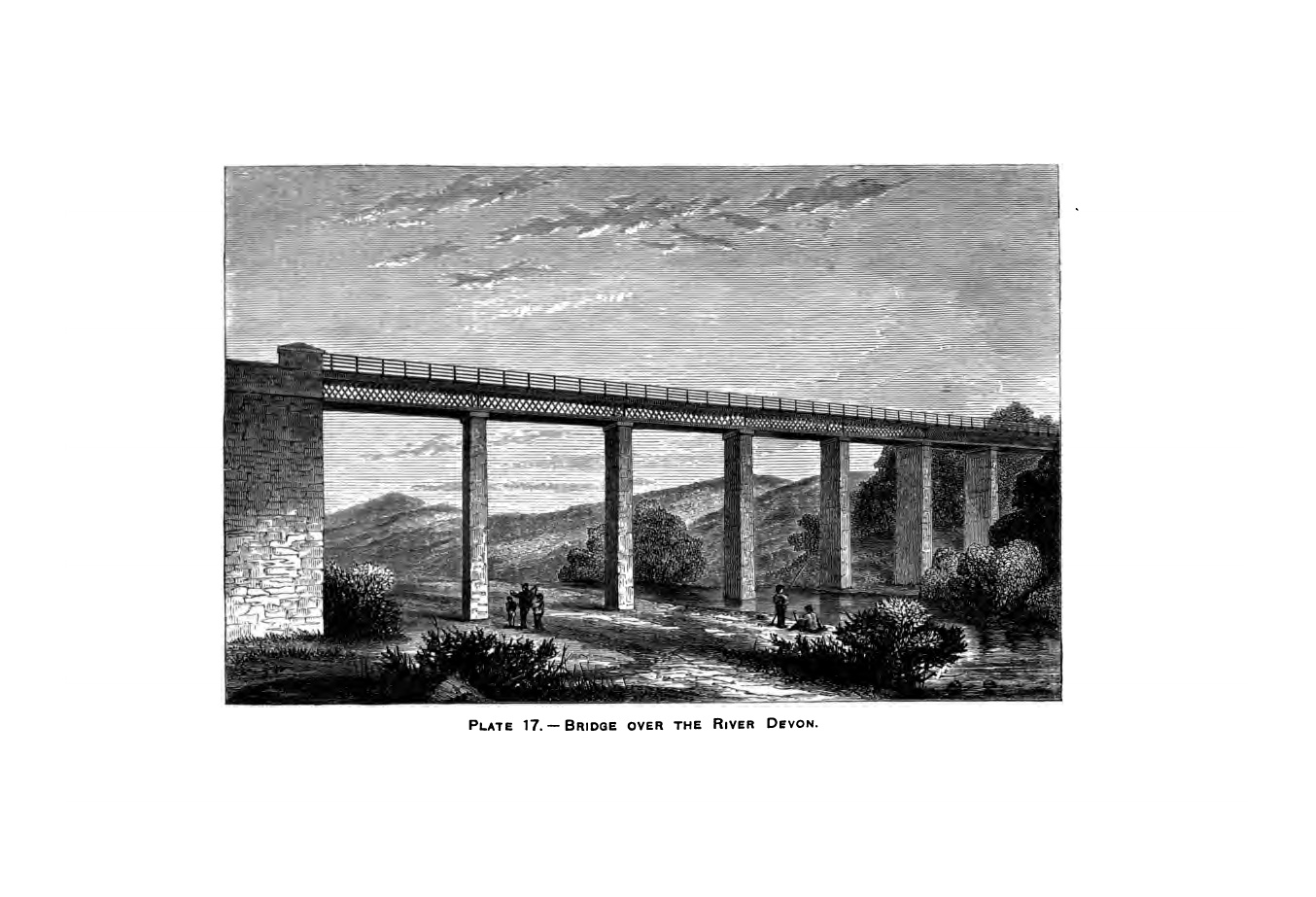
This image of the Devon Viaduct is from the book "Girder-making and the practice of bridge building in wrought iron" (1879) by Edward Moss Hutchinson

== Construction ==
Devon Valley Railway Act 1858
- Act of Parliament
- Parliament of the United Kingdom
- Long title: An Act for making a Railway from the Tillicoultry Station of the Stirling and Dunfermline Railway to the Fife and Kinross Railway at Hopefield, to be called "The Devon Valley Railway," and for other Purposes in relation thereto.
- Citation: 21 & 22 Vict. c. cxxii

Dates
- Royal assent: 23 July 1858

In 1851 the Stirling and Dunfermline Railway opened a branch line of their railway from Alloa to Tillicoultry.

The Devon Valley Railway was authorised by the Devon Valley Railway Act 1858 (21 & 22 Vict. c. cxxii); having struggled to raise sufficient capital, in 1863 it opened the 6 1/2 miles from Kinross to Rumbling Bridge. The next 4 1/2 miles was required to go alongside the Devon Water where there were a series of deep gorges making it very difficult to build a line. This was therefore shelved and a section from Dollar to Tillicoultry to join the existing line was built instead. This opened in 1869. The North British Railway supplied their expertise and capital to complete the line. To prevent a very steep descent into Dollar it was decided to rebuild the section at Rumbling Bridge to a lower level. 17 bridges had then to be constructed and an 80-foot (24 m) cutting through a hill of sand had to be made. The Devon Viaduct was described as a beautiful and imposing structure 390-foot (120 m) long with six arches on a curve. Gairney Glen viaduct was 360-foot (110 m) long with five arches. At one point the Devon Water had to be diverted. The proprietor of that stretch of water had died recently, and to gain possession of the river the company had to fight a protracted action in the Irish Court of Chancery. The complete line was finally opened to traffic in 1871.

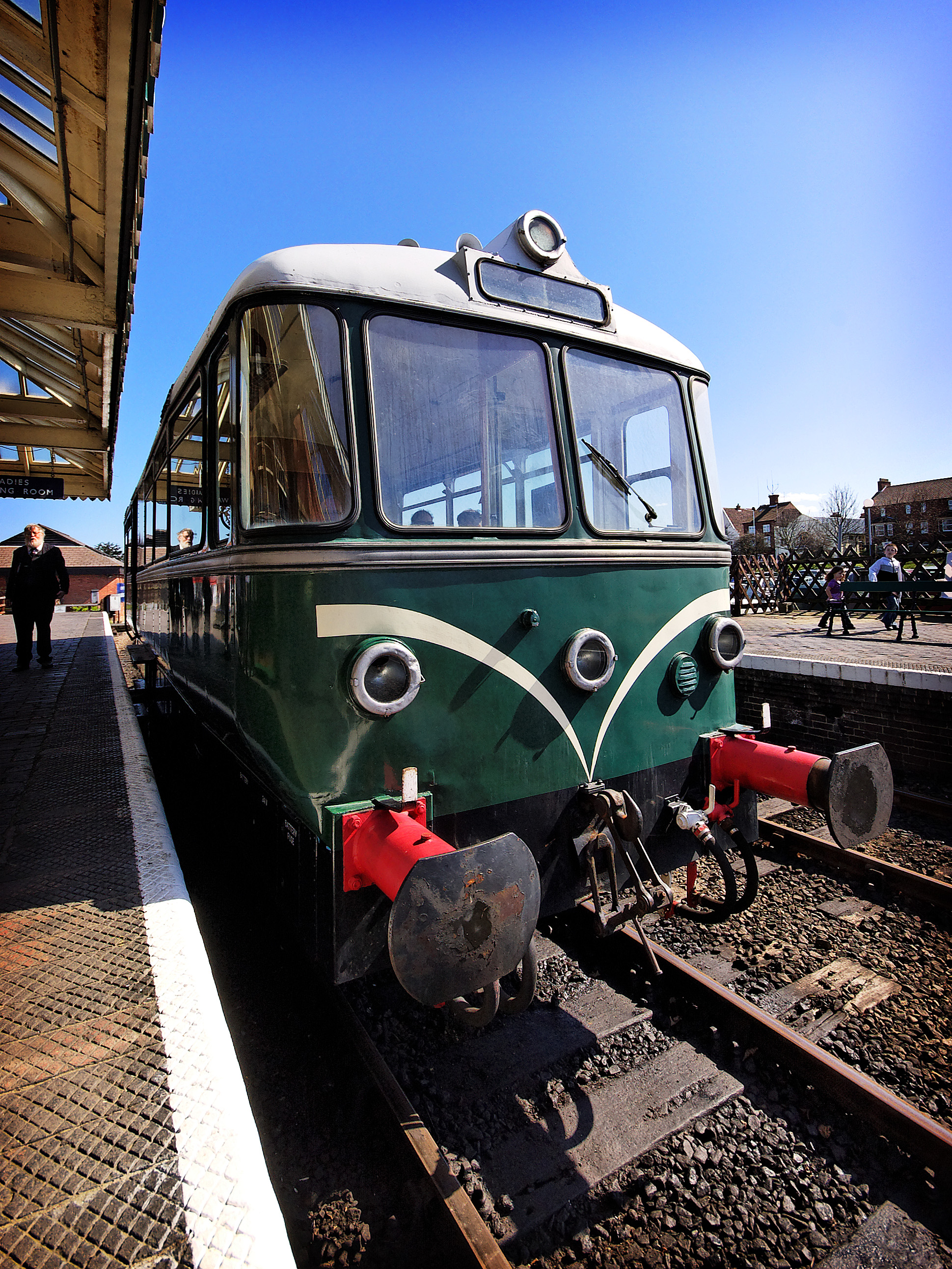
Typical Railbus where the driver is integrated into the car itself without any separation with travellers

== Operation ==
In the early years, light 0-4-2 locomotives built by Beyer, Peacock and Company of Manchester hauled most of the trains on this line. They had lavish brasswork, open splashers and footplates. The boilers were interchangeable. In the latter years railbuses were used. With the opening of the line there were now two direct routes between Glasgow and Perth. The one via the Devon Valley was known as the Picturesque route and the other, via the Forth Bridge, became known as the Historic Route. Both took about two hours to travel between Glasgow and Perth. Curling was a popular sport on Loch Leven in the winter. Special trains were run for these sportsmen and their curling stones. The men would be in first class carriages and the stones in fish wagons at the rear of the train. Coal was transported from a mine at Dollar to the power stations on the Forth estuary.

== Closure ==
Road transport made this line uneconomic and it was closed to passengers in 1964. When the Dollar mine closed in 1973 freight traffic also ceased and the track was uplifted. Today the Devon Way utilises part of the trackbed in the area of the mine.

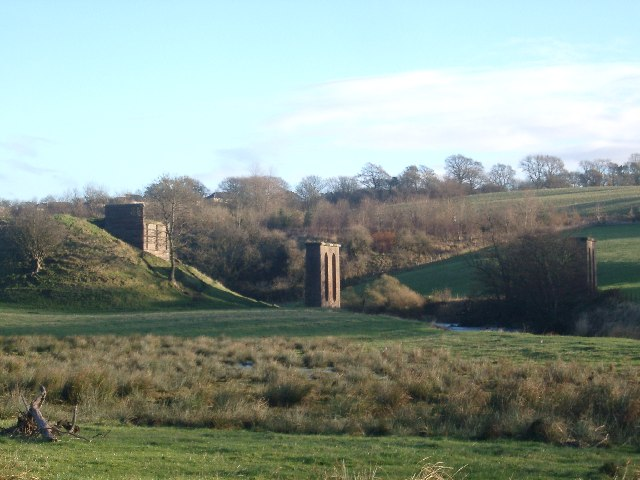
Dismantled railway bridge near Glenfoot

== See also ==
Railways of Kinross
