= Railways of Kinross =

Former railway lines in Scotland

The Railways of Kinross were a local network of three rural railways which made the town of Kinross in Scotland their objective in the 1850s.

They were:

- the Fife and Kinross Railway from Ladybank to Kinross;
- the Kinross-shire Railway from near Cowdenbeath to Kinross; and
- the Devon Valley Railway from Tillicoultry to Kinross, although the last-named was not completed until 1872.

These single-track rural lines became part of the main line network when the first Tay Bridge was opened in 1878, and then the Forth Bridge in 1890. For the Forth Bridge route two new sections of route were constructed, a cut-off line near Cowdenbeath, and the Glenfarg line connecting Mawcarse and Bridge of Earn, near Perth. All the local passenger services were discontinued by 1964, and the through Glenfarg route to Perth closed in 1970 to make way for the M90 motorway.

== History ==
=== Kinross ===
In the interior of the country, Kinross, the county town of Kinross-shire, had developed little before the railway age. By 1829 its population was only 7,762 and cotton weaving had only lately become the industry.

Nonetheless it became the destination of choice for the builders of three independent railways. By 1850 main line railways had been built surrounding it:

- the Edinburgh, Perth and Dundee Railway running from Edinburgh to Perth and Dundee (but with two ferry crossings of the Firth of Forth and Firth of Tay, and with a branch from Thornton to Dunfermline;
- the Scottish Central Railway running from Central Scotland to Perth;
- the Stirling and Dunfermline Railway.

Coal workings had been undertaken for some time in the southern part of the area around Dunfermline, at this time the greater extent of the deposits was being discovered.

=== The Fife and Kinross Railway ===
Fife and Kinross Railway Act 1855
- Act of Parliament
- Parliament of the United Kingdom
- Long title: An Act for making a Railway from Ladybank on the Line of the Edinburgh, Perth, and Dundee Railway, by Auchtermuchty and Strathmiglo, to Milnathort and Kinross.
- Citation: 18 & 19 Vict. c. cxxvii

Dates
- Royal assent: 16 July 1855

Text of statute as originally enacted

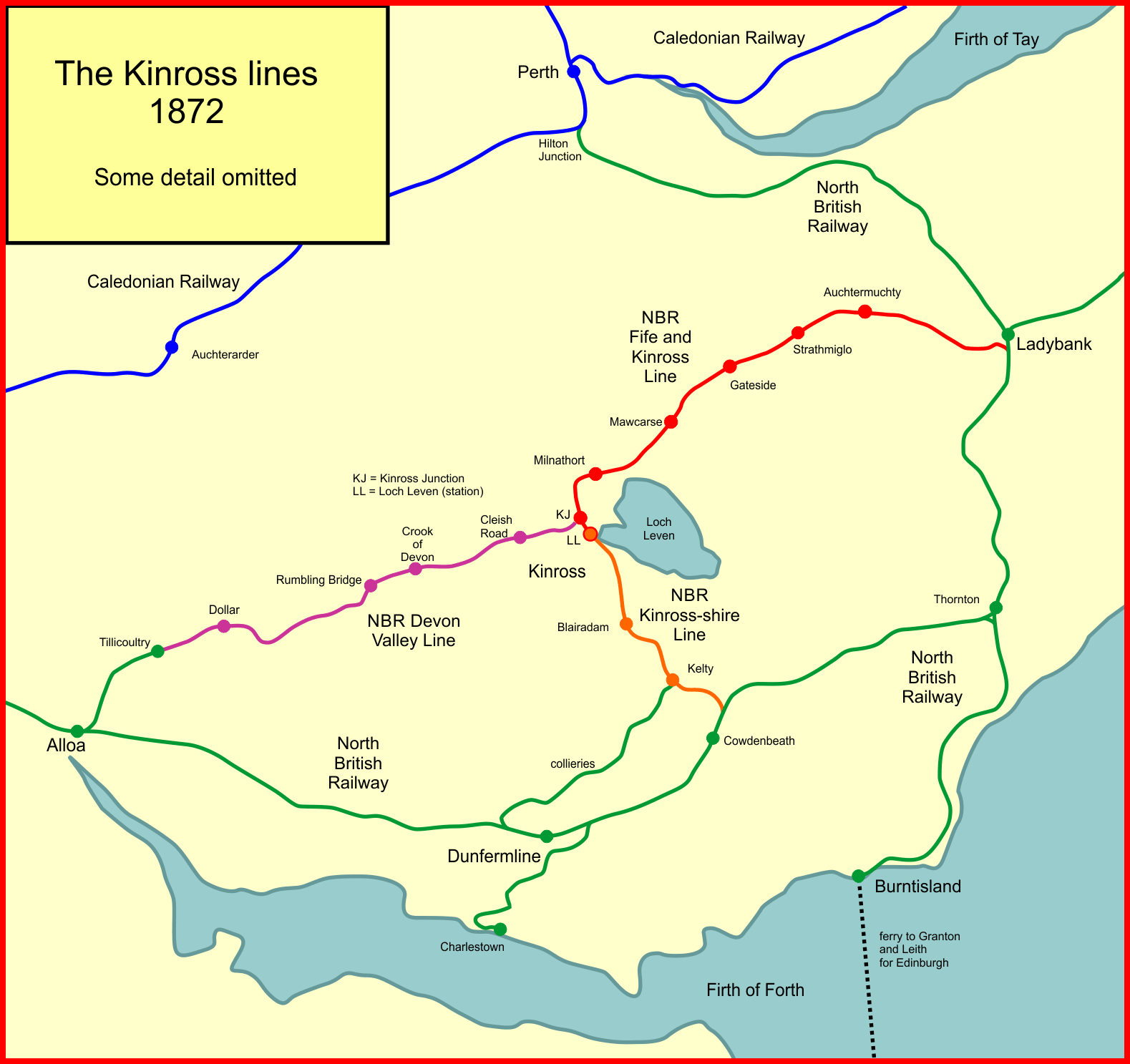
The Kinross lines in 1872

The Fife and Kinross Railway (F&KR) was authorised by an act of Parliament, the Fife and Kinross Railway Act 1855 (18 & 19 Vict. c. cxxvii), on 16 July 1855 to build a 14-mile line, to build a branch line from the Edinburgh, Perth and Dundee Railway (EP&DR) at Ladybank to Kinross. There was provision for future extension to Tillicoultry, where a connection could be made with the Stirling and Dunfermline Railway line to Alloa. The line was to be single throughout. Authorised capital for the scheme was £70,000.

The proposal had encountered considerable opposition in Parliament, especially from the EP&DR and the Scottish Central Railway, who both feared expansion of the line into a competing through route. The act of Parliament, having been secured, a contract for construction was let in the sum of £47,818; the first sod was cut among considerable rejoicing at Auchtermuchty on 14 January 1856. (Note: Thomas, Forgotten Railways, page 109; Thomas and Turnock say 12 January.) Application was made to Parliament in November 1856 to make a deviation at Milnathort, and a new line from the deviation to the EP&DR near South Lumphinnans, and a branch to Kelty colliery. The South Lumphinnans connection would have been a direct duplication of the Kinross-shire Railway route, and the latter was authorised while the F&KR proposed amendment was refused.

As the date of opening drew near, the directors found that the EP&DR was unwilling to spare a locomotive to work the line, as had been hoped, although they were prepared to hire rolling stock to the little company. The F&KR was approached by R and W Hawthorn, who had acquired the Leith Engine Works, with an offer of a locomotive. The F&KR ordered two 0-4-0 tender engines, and part-paid in shares. When delivered the locomotives were named Loch Leven Castle and Falkland Castle. Rolling stock was procured locally, and the EP&DR's offer was not taken up.

The line was opened from Ladybank to Strathmiglo on 8 June 1857, and extended to Milnathort on 9 March 1858, (Note: Thomas and Turnock; also Thomas page 110; Brice says (page 93) it opened as far as Milnathort on 15 March 1858 and to Kinross on 26 August 1858. Ross says (page 53) between Ladybank and Kinross on 15 March 1858.) and finally to Hopetown of Kinross on 20 August 1858. The line was single throughout.

The access at Ladybank was by a curve leading southwards on the Edinburgh, Perth and Dundee Railway main line; it joined that line some distance south of Ladybank station, and passenger trains arriving at Ladybank reversed on a headshunt parallel with the main line (Note: OS 25 inch map, 1892-1914 series) to a bay platform there. (Note: From Archivist of the North British Railway Study Group. Cobb shows a northwards spur at Ladybank, but this is not supported by available large scale maps.)

The line was authorised to be extended to meet the Kinross-shire Railway at a joint Kinross station by the Fife and Kinross and Kinross-shire Railways Junction and Joint Station Act 1858 (21 & 22 Vict. c. lxv) of 28 June 1858. The extension was opened on 20 September 1860, when the original F&KR station was renamed Hopefield.

Fife and Kinross Railway Amendment Act 1861
- Act of Parliament
- Parliament of the United Kingdom
- Long title: An Act to authorize the Fife and Kinross Railway Company to raise additional Capital.
- Citation: 24 & 25 Vict. c. cxxxi

Dates
- Royal assent: 11 July 1861

Edinburgh, Perth and Dundee Railway (Fife and Kinross Amalgamation) Act 1862
- Act of Parliament
- Parliament of the United Kingdom
- Long title: An Act to amalgamate the Fife and Kinross Railway Company with the Edinburgh, Perth, and Dundee Railway Company.
- Citation: 25 & 26 Vict. c. clxxxi

Dates
- Royal assent: 29 July 1862

Text of statute as originally enacted

The working of the F&KR railway was finally taken over by the EP&DR on 5 April 1861; the F&KR was always short of money and it secured absorption by the EP&DR by an act of Parliament, Edinburgh, Perth and Dundee Railway (Fife and Kinross Amalgamation) Act 1862 (25 & 26 Vict. c. clxxxi), of 29 July 1862.

=== The Kinross-shire Railway ===
Kinross-shire Railway Act 1857
- Act of Parliament
- Parliament of the United Kingdom
- Long title: An Act for making a Railway from the Dunfermline Branch of the Edinburgh, Perth, and Dundee Railway to Kinross, with a Branch to Kingseat; and for other Purposes.
- Citation: 20 & 21 Vict. c. cxxiv

Dates
- Royal assent: 10 August 1857

Text of statute as originally enacted

The Kinross-shire Railway was authorised by the Kinross-shire Railway Act 1857 (20 & 21 Vict. c. cxxiv) on 10 August 1857 to construct a single line route 7 miles long from the Dunfermline branch of the Edinburgh, Perth and Dunfermline Railway near Lumphinnans to Kinross. Authorised capital was £53,000.

Fife and Kinross and Kinross-shire Railways Junction and Joint Station Act 1858
- Act of Parliament
- Parliament of the United Kingdom
- Long title: An Act for the Formation of a Junction between the Fife and Kinross and Kinross-shire Railways, and the Construction of a joint Station at Kinross.
- Citation: 21 & 22 Vict. c. lxv

Dates
- Royal assent: 28 June 1858

In the 1858 parliamentary session a joint bill was presented by the two companies to make a connection between the two lines and to make a joint station; it was passed as the Fife and Kinross and Kinross-shire Railways Junction and Joint Station Act 1858 (21 & 22 Vict. c. lxv). The Kinross-shire Railway opened its line on 20 June 1860 to a temporary station about a quarter mile south of the now-authorised joint station, (Note: Actually on the south-east side of the Cowdenbeath Road.) and the extension to the joint station with the Fife and Kinross Railway was opened on 20 September 1860. The EP&DR had agreed to work the line provided that the Kinross-shire acquired its own locomotive, and it did so, obtaining one similar to the F&KR engines, also from R & W Hawthorn.

Just before opening the contractor threatened to prevent it until his bill was paid.

The passenger timetable on the two Kinross lines worked in harmony, with trains making good connections at Kinross. There was a traffic agreement between the two railways determining which route traffic originating or terminating on the line should take; this occasionally led to some counter-intuitive routings.

Kinross-shire Railway (Branches) Act 1861
- Act of Parliament
- Parliament of the United Kingdom
- Long title: An Act to enable the Kinross-shire Railway Company to make certain Branch Railways; and for other Purposes.
- Citation: 24 & 25 Vict. c. clxxvii

Dates
- Royal assent: 22 July 1861

The company obtained the Kinross-shire Railway (Branches) Act 1861 (24 & 25 Vict. c. clxxvii) in July 1861 authorising a branch from Kelty to Kingseat, where it was intended to make a junction with the West of Fife Mineral Railway. the line opened in 1863.

The financial performance of the little company was poor, and inevitably it had to seek absorption by its larger neighbour; an act of Parliament, the Edinburgh, Perth and Dundee Railway Act 1861 (24 & 25 Vict. c. ccxiv) giving authority to amalgamate with the EP&DR was obtained on 1 August 1861.

=== Devon Valley Railway ===
The Devon Valley Railway was incorporated by the Devon Valley Railway Act 1858 (21 & 22 Vict. c. cxxii) on 23 July 1858 to build a line from the Stirling and Dunfermline Railway station at Tillicoultry to Hopefield (Kinross); the authorised capital was £90,000. A further act of Parliament, the Devon Valley Railway Act 1861 (24 & 25 Vict. c. cc) of 1 August 1861, authorised several deviations, and then the Devon Valley Railway Act 1863 (26 & 27 Vict. c. cxxiv) brought about a £10,000 reduction of capital. The Scottish Central Railway and the Edinburgh and Glasgow Railway each had powers to contribute £30,000 to the share subscription, but on 4 August 1858 both those companies declared a change of mind. Nonetheless by 1864 the NBR contributed £40,000 fearing an incursion into Fife by the rival Caledonian Railway.

The first sod was cut on 4 August 1860, but then nothing much was done as it proved difficult to raise the money. Eventually on 1 May 1863 the 6 1/2 miles (10.5 km) section between Kinross and Rumbling Bridge was opened.

The next section was to traverse exceptionally difficult terrain, and it was decided to build from the other end of the route, at Tillicoultry. Work started there and the line was opened to Dollar on 3 May 1869. The NBR paid £10 for life membership of Dollar Water Supply Association for DVR engine water.

The Devon Valley and North British Railway Companies (Arrangements) Act 1866 (29 & 30 Vict. c. cccxxvi) obliged the North British Railway to pay £60,000 for completion of the DVR line; this had been agreed to when the NBR was in expansionist mood and desired to exclude the Caledonian Railway from the area. Now the NBR had to make good on its promise. The NBR decided that the Rumbling Bridge station configuration was inconvenient for the extension, and it altered the proposed alignment, easing the ruling gradient from 1-in-50 to 1-in-63. The difficult intermediate section was completed and the line was opened throughout on 1 May 1871.

The DVR line joined the Fife and Kinross Railway line at Hopefield, now renamed Kinross Junction. The DVR company was independent but the line was worked by the NBR, until it absorbed the DVR in 1875.

The DVR was vested in the NBR on 1 January 1875, under authority of the North British Railway Act 1875 (38 & 39 Vict. c. c), with £100 DVR shares being exchanged for £62 10s NBR ordinary shares.

=== The Tay Bridge ===
Completion of the three Kinross lines gave the NBR a route from Ladybank to Alloa. The opening of the first Tay bridge enabled through carriages to be run from Edinburgh and Glasgow to Dundee and Aberdeen, via Kinross. Completion of the second Tay bridge transformed Fife, enabling the North British Railway to run fast trains from Dundee to Glasgow and Edinburgh. Some trains ran from Glasgow to Perth via the Devon Valley (portrayed for publicity purposes as the "Picturesque route"), and ten trains ran daily between those places, half on the Devon Valley route and half on the traditional route.

== The Forth Bridge ==
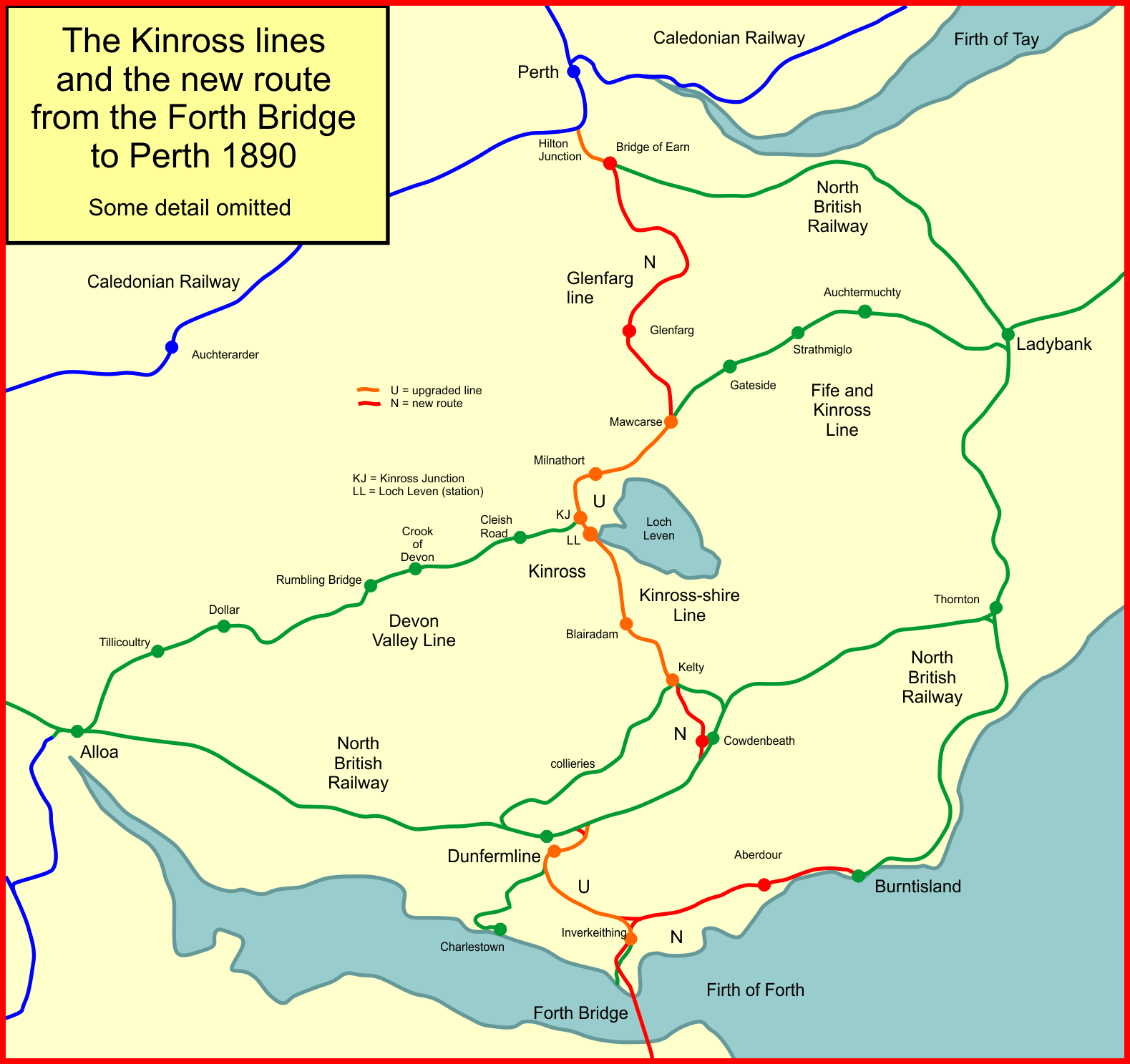
The Kinross in 1890 when the Forth Bridge opened

The Forth Bridge was fully opened for all traffic on 2 June 1890. It required a number of enhancements to the main line routes of the North British Railway leading to it. The Kinross route was transformed into part of the main line from Cowdenbeath to Perth, and the entire route section from Kelty to Mawcasrse Junction was doubled and upgraded for main line running.

=== The Glenfarg Line ===
The Glenfarg Line is the name often given to the line between Kinross and Perth (actually Mawcarse Junction and Hilton Junction).

North British (Edinburgh, Dunfermline and Perth) Railway Act 1863
- Act of Parliament
- Parliament of the United Kingdom
- Long title: An Act to authorize the Construction of Railways and other Works for improving the Railway Communication between Edinburgh and Perth viâ the Firth of Forth; and for other Purposes.
- Citation: 26 & 27 Vict. c. ccxiii

Dates
- Royal assent: 28 July 1863

Text of statute as originally enacted

As early as 1863, long before the construction of the Forth or Tay bridges, the North British Railway had obtained the North British (Edinburgh, Dunfermline and Perth) Railway Act 1863 (26 & 27 Vict. c. ccxiii) giving powers to build a line through Glenfarg, linking the proposed Dunfermline and Queensferry Railway and the Kinross lines, which were to be doubled. From Glenfarg the line would run directly to Perth, by-passing the Caledonian route from Hilton Junction through Moncrieffe tunnel. At the Queensferry end, there would be train ferries across the Forth.

In 1867 nothing had been done and the company had to ask for authority for extra time to build the line; meanwhile shareholders were becoming concerned about the financial commitment to numerous new construction schemes, and the project was dropped.

The scheme was revived during the preparation for the construction of the Forth Bridge. It was obvious that this would fundamentally change traffic patterns: NBR traffic was still crossing the Firth of Forth by ferry steamer. As well as the immediate approach railways at Queensferry, a new line was built from Saughton, some distance west of Edinburgh, to Dalmeny. In Fife the Glenfarg line was being built, connecting Mawcarse, on the Fife and Kinross line, with Bridge of Earn on the NBR route from Ladybank, close to Hilton Junction from where the NBR had running powers to Perth.

Leaving the north side of the Forth Bridge, trains would reach Inverkeithing over the approach railway, and then Touch Junctions at Dunfermline by the 1866 line. Joining the Dunfermline branch of the old EP&DR company, trains could run eastwards for a few miles before running on to another section of new route at Cowdenbeath giving access at Kelty South Junction to the old Kinross-shire Railway. The route then continued through Kinross on to the Fife and Kinross-shire line, diverging at Mawcarse on to the new Glenfarg route, and thence to Perth. All this was double track, and the relevant sections of the Kinross railways, which had been quiet backwaters, were doubled and upgraded to main line running standards.

On 2 June 1890 the Forth Bridge was opened to through traffic, and on the same day the Glenfarg line and the deviation line by-passing Cowdenbeath were also opened.

=== Cowdenbeath improvements ===
The cut-off line at Cowdenbeath, from Cowdenbeath South Junction, used a new, more convenient, Cowdenbeath station, named Cowdenbeath New, and from 2 June 1890 the original station was named Cowdenbeath Old. There were numerous colliery connections off the old main line in the Cowdenbeath area, and congestion there prompted the construction of a short connection from the new Cowdenbeath line returning to the original line at Lumphinnans. This was operational by 1915, and through trains towards Thornton were diverted to it. It was known as the Cowdenbeath Loop. There were now two passenger stations in Cowdenbeath, "Old" and "New" and on 31 March 1919 Cowdenbeath Old station was closed and Cowdenbeath New was renamed Cowdenbeath. (Note: Although the 1938 "Bradshaw" still uses "Cowdenbeath (New)".) The section of the original main line was downgraded to mineral line status and remained open at least to 1960.

The deviation route remains in use today: ordinary passenger trains towards Glenrothes diverge from the original main line at what had been Cowdenbeath South Junction on the 1890 new line, calling at what had been Cowdenbeath New station; they then follow the Cowdenbeath Loop at Cowdenbeath North Junction and rejoin the original main line at the former Lumphinnans South Junction. This is the only part of the network described in this article that remains open to traffic.

=== 1938 passenger trains service ===
In 1938 the passenger service on the Kinross lines was on two axes.

The first was from Edinburgh via Dunfermline and Cowdenbeath to Kinross and Perth. There were six fast trains on the route including two sleeping car trains from Kings Cross to Inverness. Most daytime trains called at Dunfermline and Kinross. In addition there were four through stopping trains and some short workings.

The second was from Alloa and Tillicoultry to Kinross and Ladybank. There were four stopping trains each way, with some short workings. For the few years between the opening of the Tay Bridge and the Forth Bridge, this had been a significant route for the North British Railway between Glasgow, Alloa, Kinross and Dundee but that importance had vanished after 1890.

== Closure ==
The Devon Valley Railway route closed on 15 June 1964, although goods services continued between Tillicoultry and Alloa until 25 June 1973.

The Fife and Kinross line closed between Ladybank and Mawcarse Junction on 5 June 1950 to passengers, and to goods on 5 October 1964.

The Kelty - Kinross - Glenfarg - Hilton Junction line closed on 5 January 1970, although goods traffic continued to Kinross and Milnathort until 4 May 1970. When the Glenfarg line closed, Perth to Edinburgh services were diverted over the slower route via Stirling and subsequently, with some improvement in journey time, along the Bridge of Earn to Ladybank line when it was reopened (it had closed to passengers in September 1955)

The original section of the Kinross-shire Railway between Lumphinnans Central Junction and Kelty South Junction closed to passengers on 2 June 1890 when the cut-off line opened, but remained open for mineral traffic at least until 1960.

== Topography ==
Kinross-shire Railway

- Lumphinnan Junction; diverged from Dunfermline to Thornton line; there was later a north curve and the junctions were named Lumphinnan Central Junction (nearest Dunfermline), East Junction (nearest Thornton) and North Junction (nearest Kelty);
- Kelty South Junction; convergence of direct line from Cowdenbeath;
- Kelty; opened 20 June 1860; closed 22 September 1930; divergence of colliery lines;
- Blairadam; opened 20 June 1860; closed 22 September 1930;
- Kinross; temporary terminus opened 20 June 1860; closed soon after 20 September 1860 when line extended;
- Kinross soon after 20 September 1860; renamed Loch Leven 1871; closed 1 September 1921.

Fife and Kinross Railway

- Kinross (joint station opened when line extended); above;
- Kinross; opened 20 August 1858; renamed Hopefield Junction 1860; renamed Kinross Junction 1871; resited 200 yards north 1890; closed 5 January 1970; convergence of Devon Valley line;
- Milnathort; opened 9 March 1858; closed 15 June 1964;
- Mawcarse; opened 9 March 1858; then Mawcarse Junction until 1962; closed 15 June 1964; divergence of Glenfarg line;
- Gateside; opened 9 March 1858; closed 5 June 1950;
- Strathmiglo; opened 6 June 1857; closed 5 June 1950;
- Auchtermuchty; opened 6 June 1857; closed 5 June 1950;
- Ladybank; station on Edinburgh, Perth and Dundee Railway main line (opened 20 Sep 1847).

Devon Valley Railway

- Tillicoultry; opened January or February 1852 (Stirling and Dunfermline Railway station); closed 15 June 1964; end-on junction with Stirling and Dunfermline Railway;
- Dollar; opened 3 May 1869; closed 15 June 1964;
- Rumbling Bridge; opened 1 May 1863; closed 1 October 1868 for line rebuilding; reopened 1 October 1870 on deviation; closed 15 June 1964;
- Crook of Devon; opened 1 May 1863; closed 15 June 1964;
- Cleish Road; opened 1 May 1863; renamed Balado 1878; closed 15 June 1964;
- Kinross (Hopefield Junction); above.

Glenfarg Line

- Mawcarse; above;
- Glenfarg; opened 2 June 1890; closed 15 June 1964;
- Bridge of Earn; opened 1 February 1892 (relocation of EP&DR station); closed 15 June 1964; convergence with Edinburgh, Perth and Dundee line to Perth.

The gradients on the post-1890 route from Cowdenbeath to Perth were severe. Cowdenbeath was at the summit of a stiff climb from Inverkeithing, and on leaving the line fell for two miles at 1 in 80 / 78. There were the switchback undulations as far as Milnathort, after which the line climbed at 1 in 158 - 200 as far as Mawcarse Junction. The difficult terrain from there to Bridge of Earn forced a three-mile climb at 1 in 94 followed by a drop at 1 in 75 for six miles without a break as far as Bridge of Earn.
