= Cairnbulg railway station =

Railway station in Aberdeenshire, Scotland

Coordinates: 57.6754°N 1.9331°W

Cairnbulg
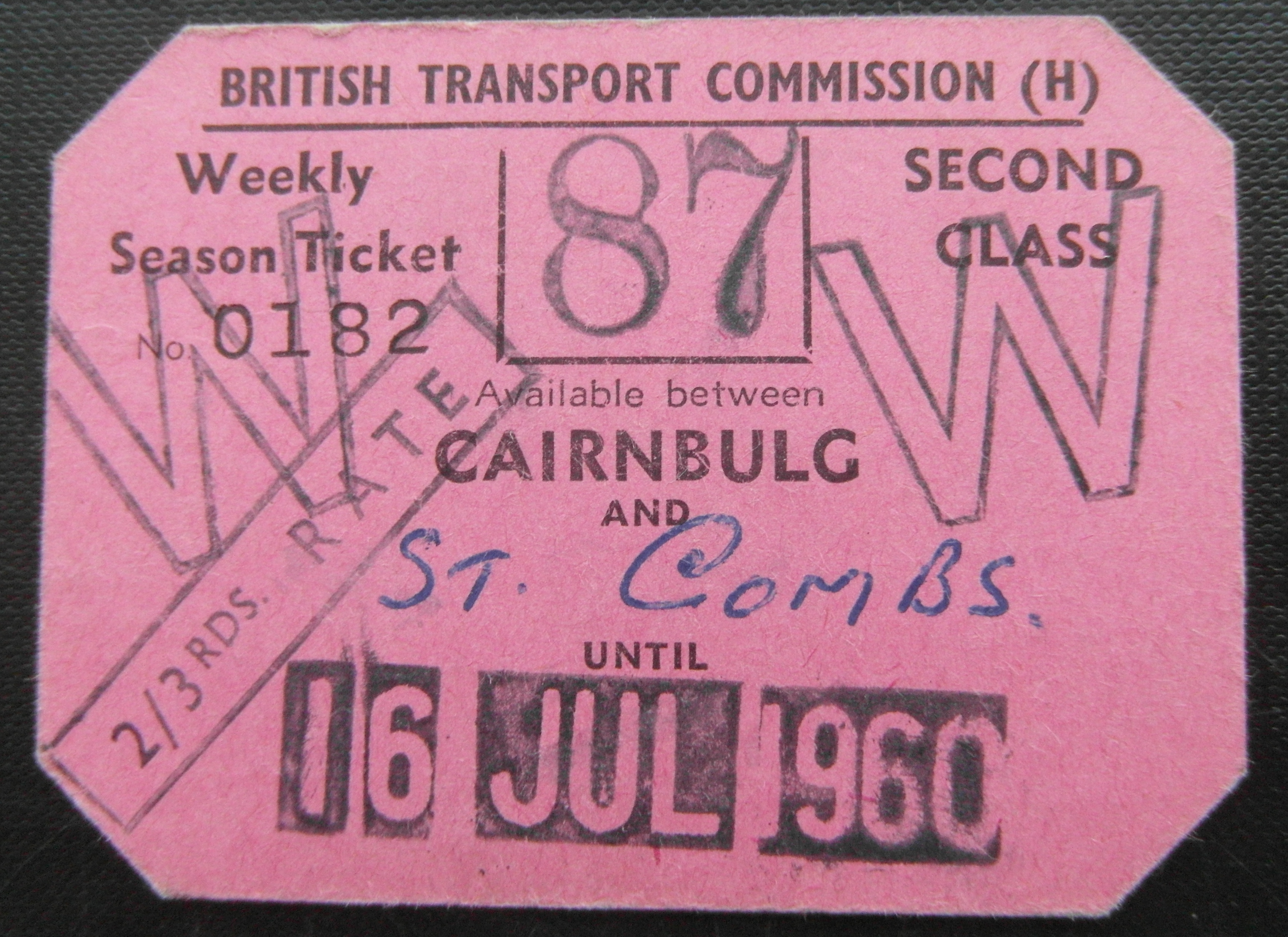
- A season ticket for Cairnbulg to St Combs

General information
- Location: Scotland
- Grid reference: NK040650
- Platforms: 1

Other information
- Status: Disused

History
- Pre-grouping: Great North of Scotland Railway
- Post-grouping: London and North Eastern Railway

Key dates
- 1 July 1903: Opened as Inverallochy
- 1 September 1903: Renamed Cairnbulg
- 3 May 1965: Closed
Location

Cairnbulg railway station was a station on the Fraserburgh and St Combs Light Railway, Aberdeenshire. It was opened in 1903 as Inverallochy and was renamed Cairnbulg on 1 September 1903.

== History ==
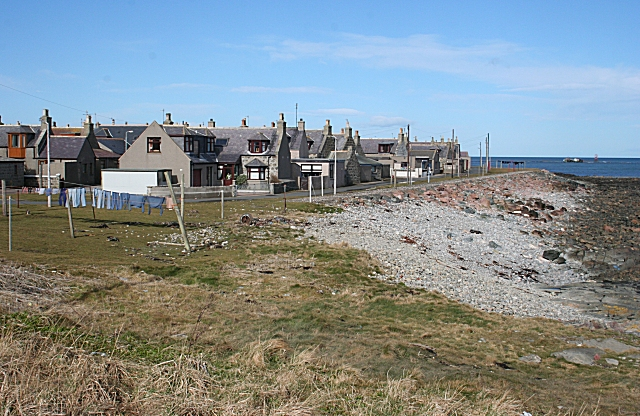
Inverallochy

The line from Fraserburgh to St Combs opened in 1903 and was the last line built by the Great North of Scotland Railway before it became part of the London and North Eastern Railway. The line was closed in 1965 by the Scottish Region of British Railways as part of the Beeching Cuts. The St Combs line was partly unfenced and it was therefore classified as a light railway with locomotives carrying cow catchers.

Inverallochy (Inbhir Aileachaidh in Gaelic) and Cairnbulg villages have no clear physical separation. The 1948 timetable shows that all trains stopped at the station. Due to the lack of crossing gates several serious accidents occurred over the years.

RAF Fraserburgh, Cairnbulg Airfield, or Inverallochy Airfield was located near the station from 1941 to 1945 during WWII and was associated with Longside Airfield. Aberdeen Gliding Club used the airfield until some point in the late 1950s. These uses would have provided extra passenger traffic for the station.

== Infrastructure ==
The single-platformed station stood on the seaward side of the line, with an ungated level crossing over the B9107 on the line to St Combs and a railway cottage nearby. There were a name board and a shelter that may have been an old goods van on the low platform, and originally there was a rectangular stone built ticket office with some form of signalling. The station stood 3 5/8 miles (5.8 km) from Fraserburgh railway station.

It was built of wood with a gravel surface, similar in construction to Kirkton Bridge Halt and Philorth Bridge Halt. The station had a passing loop and two sidings: one running into the platform apparently as a bay, and another running to a loading dock. The passing loop was lifted some years before the line closed.

== Services ==
The line in 1910 had seven return workings on weekdays and an additional late night Saturday train from Fraserburgh that departed at 9.30pm and returned at 10pm. No Sunday services were provided on the railway. The 1964 - 1965 timetable had 11 return workings per day between Fraserburgh and St Combs with an additional service on Saturdays. The full journey to St Combs took around twenty minutes and connections for Aberdeen were available at the Fraserburgh railway station terminus.

Cairnbulg was not a request stop. The line closed to goods and was unstaffed from 7 November 1960.

== The site today ==
The trackbed is visible in places, the loading dock can be seen and the railway cottage remains as a private house.

== Sources ==
- Butt, R. V. J. (October 1995). The Directory of Railway Stations: details every public and private passenger station, halt, platform and stopping place, past and present (1st ed.). Sparkford: Patrick Stephens Ltd. ISBN 978-1-85260-508-7. OCLC 60251199. OL 11956311M.
- Maxtone, Graham and Cooper, Mike (2018). Then and Now on the Great North. V.1. GNoSR Association. ISBN 978-0902343-30-6.

Preceding station	Historical railways	Following station
Philorth Bridge Halt; Line and Station closed	Great North of Scotland Railway; Fraserburgh and St Combs Light Railway	St Combs; Line and Station closed
