= Philorth Bridge Halt railway station =

Former railway stop in Aberdeenshire, Scotland

Coordinates: 57.6695°N 1.9671°W

Philorth Bridge Halt

General information
- Location: Scotland
- Grid reference: NK020644
- Platforms: 1

Other information
- Status: Disused

History
- Pre-grouping: Great North of Scotland Railway
- Post-grouping: London and North Eastern Railway

Key dates
- 1 July 1903: Opened as Philorth Bridge Halt
- 3 May 1965: Closed
Location

Philorth Bridge Halt railway station, not to be confused with Philorth railway station on the old Formartine and Buchan Railway, was a request stop on the Fraserburgh and St Combs Light Railway, Aberdeenshire. It was opened in 1903 as Philorth Bridge Halt and stood just to the east of Philorth Bridge, the Water of Philorth and the lane to Cairnbulg Castle.

== History ==
The line from Fraserburgh to St Combs opened in 1903 and was the last line built by the Great North of Scotland Railway before it became part of the London and North Eastern Railway. The line was closed in 1965 by the Scottish Region of British Railways as part of the Beeching Cuts. The St Combs line was partly unfenced and it was therefore classified as a light railway with locomotives carrying cow catchers. Philorth Castle, renamed Cairnbulg Castle is located nearby. The 1948 timetable gives the station name as Philorth Bridge Halt.

== Infrastructure ==
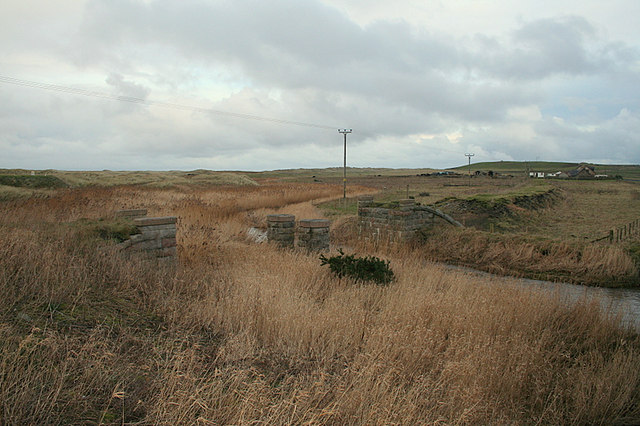
The remains of Philorth Bridge from the station site.

The short single platformed halt stood on the landward side, of the line just to the west of Philorth Bridge. It was accessed via a path running across the road and photographs show that it was built of wood with a gravel surface, very similar to Kirkton Bridge Halt railway station. A simple shelter was present with no lighting and the station had no sidings or signalling. Two railway related huts stood on the other side of the track from the halt. A photograph of 1951 suggests that the halt was located on the seaward side of the line. White posts beside the track at the halt assisted the train driver in positioning the train in poor light conditions or after dark.

== Services ==
The line in 1910 had seven return workings on weekdays and an additional late night Saturday train from Fraserburgh that departed at 9.30pm and returned at 10pm. No Sunday services were provided on the railway. The 1964 - 1965 timetable had 11 return workings per day between Fraserburgh and St Combs with an additional service on Saturdays. The full journey took around twenty minutes and connections for Aberdeen were available at Fraserburgh railway station.

Philorth Bridge was a request stop with passengers required to inform the guard if they wished to alight there. The line closed to goods on 7 November 1960, Philorth Bridge Halt however had never handled goods.

== The site today ==
The trackbed is visible in places however nothing remains of the halt.

Former Services

Preceding station	Historical railways	Following station
Kirkton Bridge Halt; Line and Station closed	Great North of Scotland Railway Fraserburgh and St Combs Light Railway	Cairnbulg; Line and Station closed

== Sources ==
- Butt, R. V. J. (October 1995). The Directory of Railway Stations: details every public and private passenger station, halt, platform and stopping place, past and present (1st ed.). Sparkford: Patrick Stephens Ltd. ISBN 978-1-85260-508-7. OCLC 60251199. OL 11956311M.
- Maxtone, Graham and Cooper, Mike (2018). Then and Now on the Great North. V.1. GNoSR Association. ISBN 978-0902343-30-6.
