= Inverallochy and Cairnbulg =

Coordinates: 57.675°N 1.933°W

Inverallochy and Cairnbulg: Scottish Gaelic: Inbhir Aileachaidh is Càrn Builg
- Location within Aberdeenshire
- Population: 1,350 (2020)
- OS grid reference: NK041650
- Council area: Aberdeenshire
- Lieutenancy area: Aberdeenshire
- Country: Scotland
- Sovereign state: United Kingdom
- Post town: FRASERBURGH
- Postcode district: AB43
- Dialling code: 013465
- Police: Scotland
- Fire: Scottish
- Ambulance: Scottish
- UK Parliament: Aberdeenshire North and Moray East
- Scottish Parliament: Banffshire and Buchan Coast

The villages of Inverallochy (Scots pronunciation: [ɪnvərˈɑɫəxe], Scottish Gaelic: Inbhir Aileachaidh) and Cairnbulg (Scottish Gaelic: Càrn Builg meaning 'gap cairn') lie some 4 miles (6.4 km) east of Fraserburgh, in North East Scotland. It formerly consisted of the three fishing villages of Brandesburgh, Cairnbulg and Inverallochy, but the former village has since disappeared.

Cairnbulg Castle, one of the nine castles of the Knuckle, originally dated to the 13th century and parts of the current construction are believed to date to an earlier period but whereas the land of Inverallochy was granted by Earl Alexander to Jordan Comyn in 1277, there is no indication that the now-ruined Inverallochy Castle was built at such an early date. Cairnbulg Castle was a stronghold of the Comyns, but was given by Robert the Bruce to the Earls of Ross in 1316 following the Harrying of Buchan, then passed to the Frasers from 1375 until 1666. The current construction is a late 19th-century re-build following a century of abandonment and dereliction.

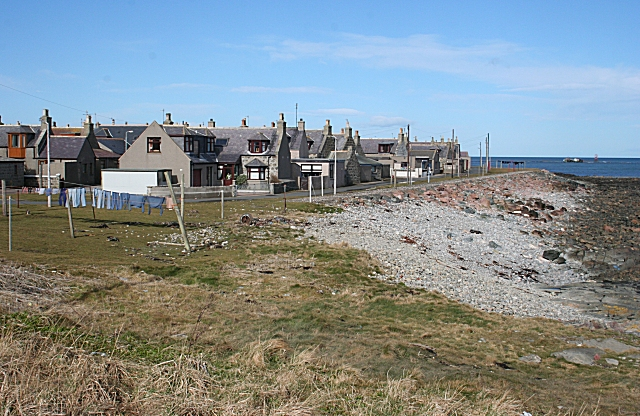
Houses by the sea

Well-established fishing communities were in place in the area by the early 16th century, but after an epidemic of cholera in the 1860s wiped out the "collections of huts next to which fishing boats were dragged out of reach of the tide", planned fishing settlements were recreated at Inverallochy and the twinned village Cairnbulg. As a result of this planning, within 20 years over 200 boats were based here, although in recent years this has dwindled to almost zero as larger, commercial operations became focused on the nearby ports of Fraserburgh and Peterhead.

Cairnbulg railway station was opened on 1 July 1903. It was originally named Inverallochy, but was renamed on 1 September, two months after it opened. The station closed in 1965. Philorth Bridge Halt was located near the Water of Philorth at the entrance to Cairnbulg Castle.

Owing to the close proximity of the villages to one another, the name Invercairn has in recent years become used on a local basis to represent both, such as in Invercairn Gala and Invercairn Utd FC.

== Fishing ==
The Annual Reports of the Fishery Board for Scotland provide an insight into fishing in Inverallochy and Cairnbulg in the years before the First World War. For example, in the Report for 1905, also referring to St Combs and Charlestown we learn that "The light railway continues to be a boon to the fishing population of these villages. They are the only places in which an increase of boats has occurred during the year. More houses have also been erected by fishermen. The railway company have further increased their service of trains, so that these villages now almost have an hourly service during the day".

Fishery Statistics

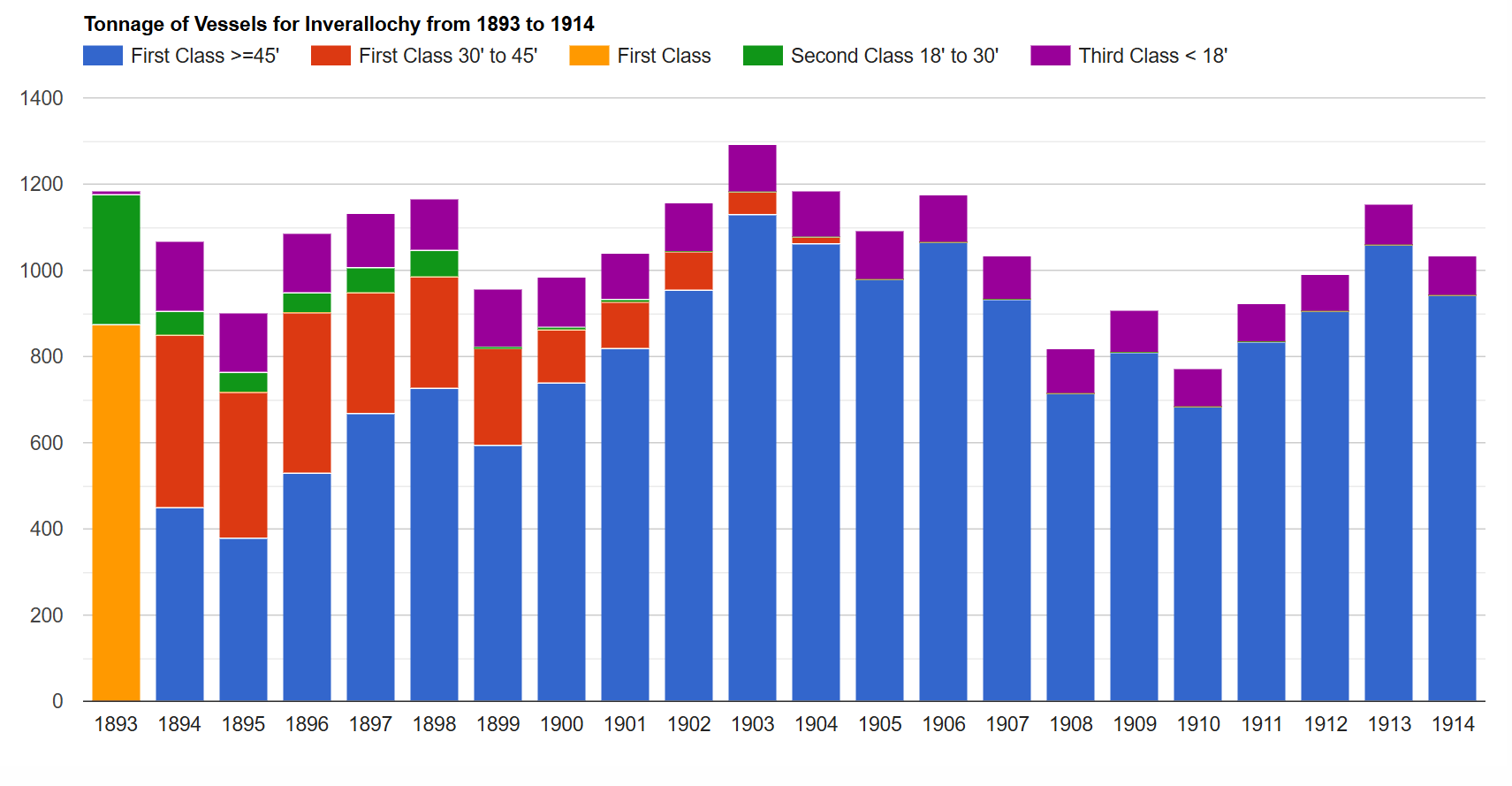
Inverallochy tonnage of vessels

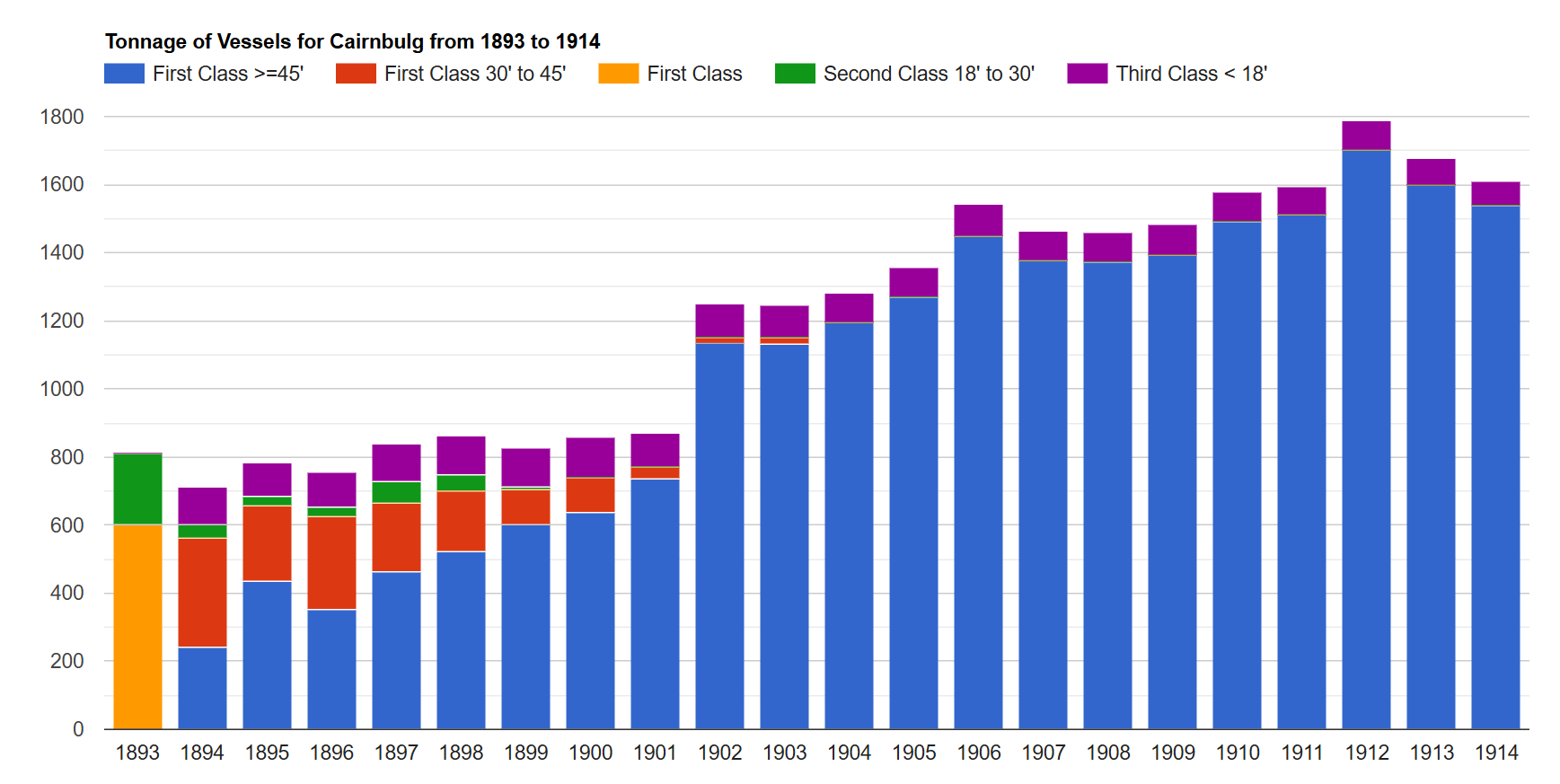
Cairnbulg tonnage of vessels

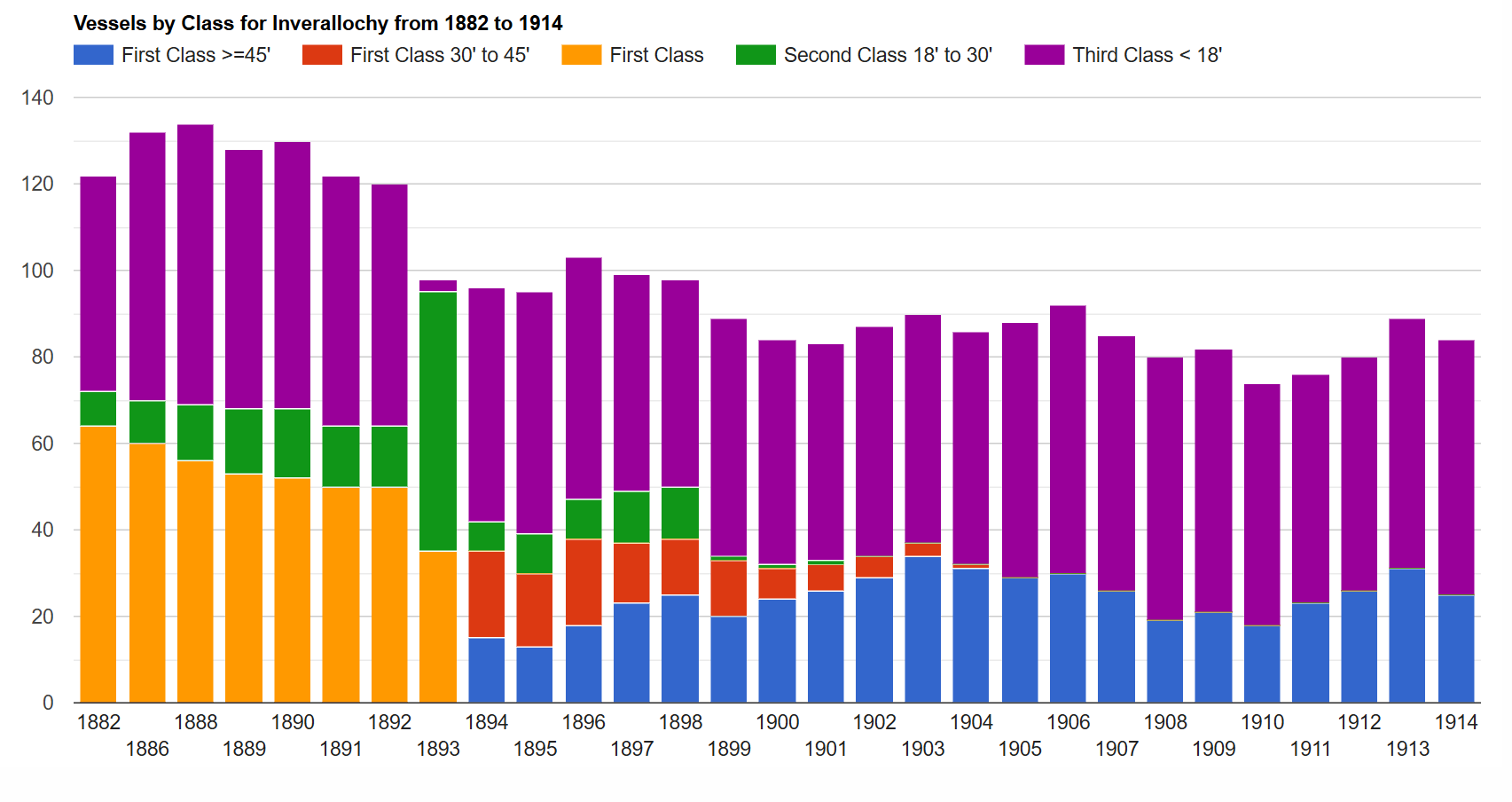
Inverallochy vessels by class

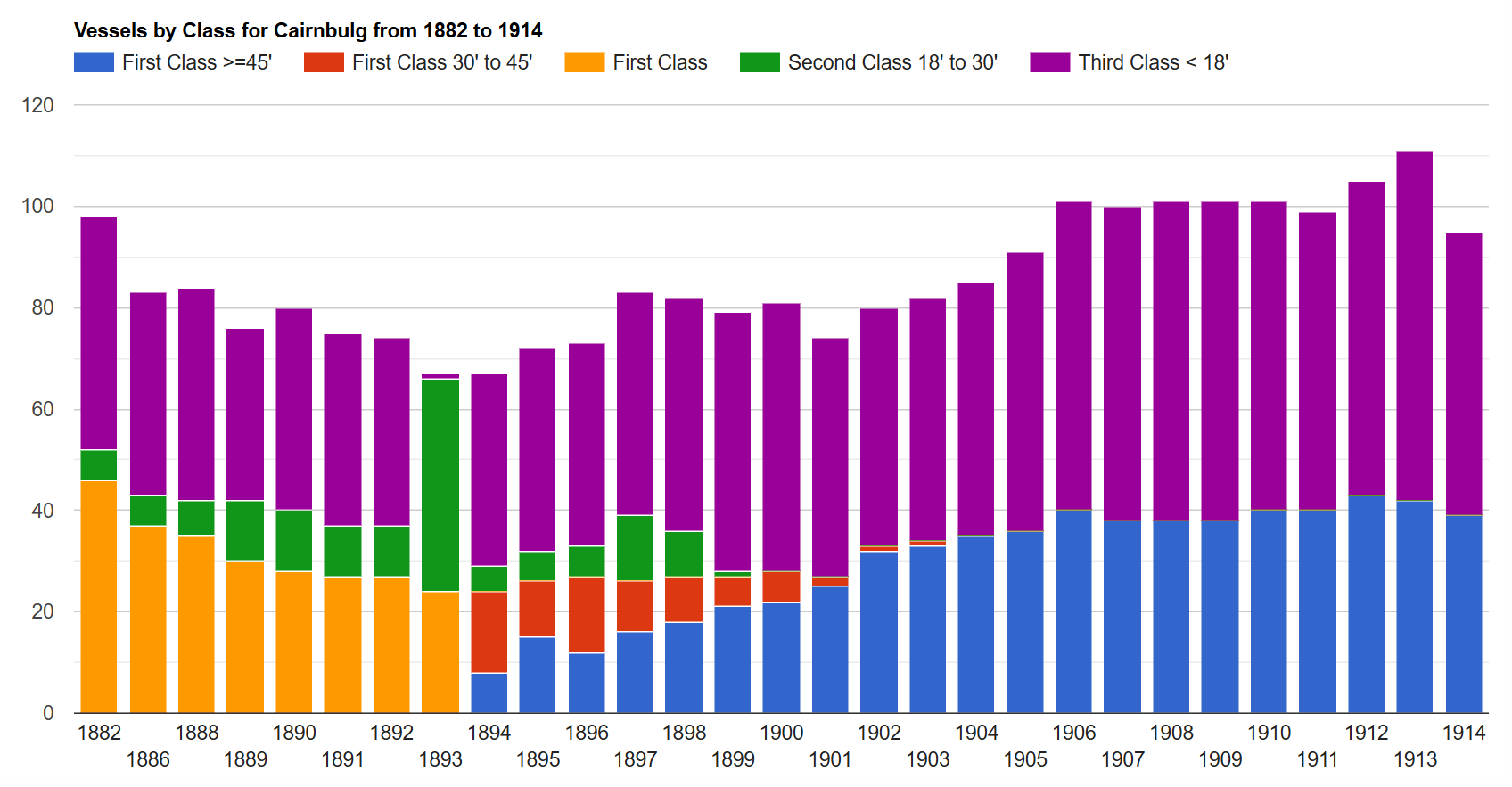
Cairnbulg vessels by class

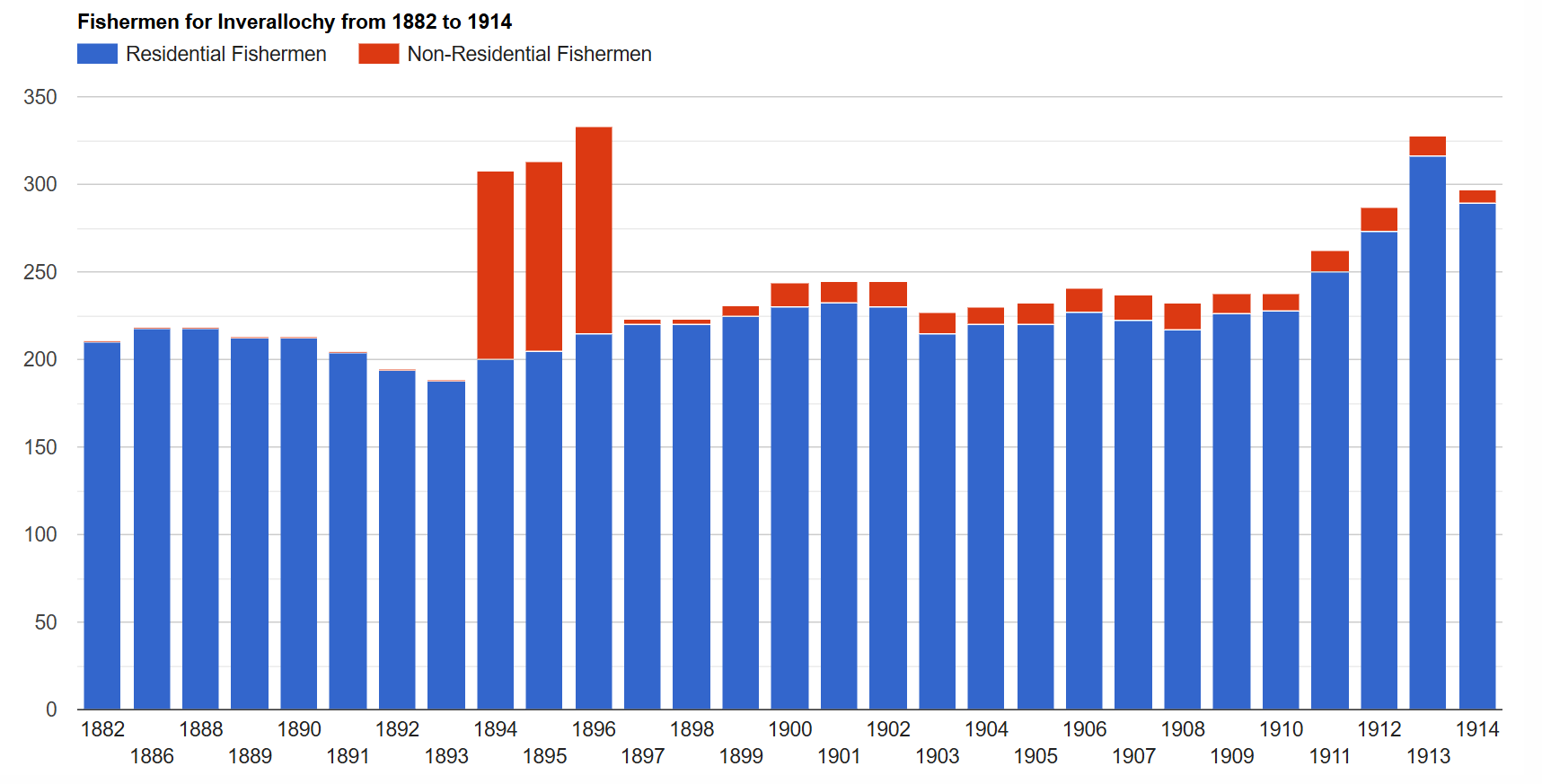
Inverallochy fishermen

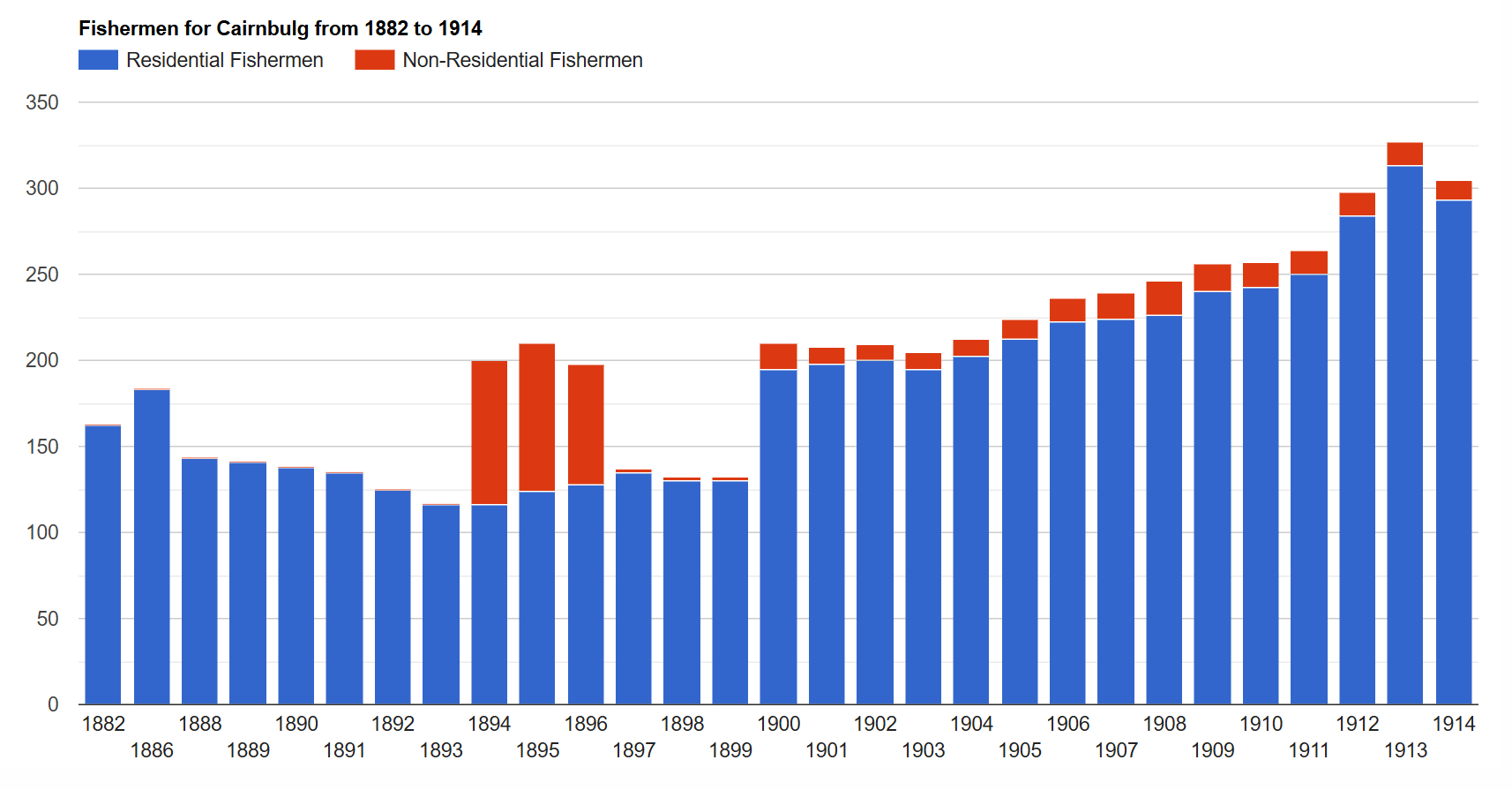
Cairnbulg fishermen

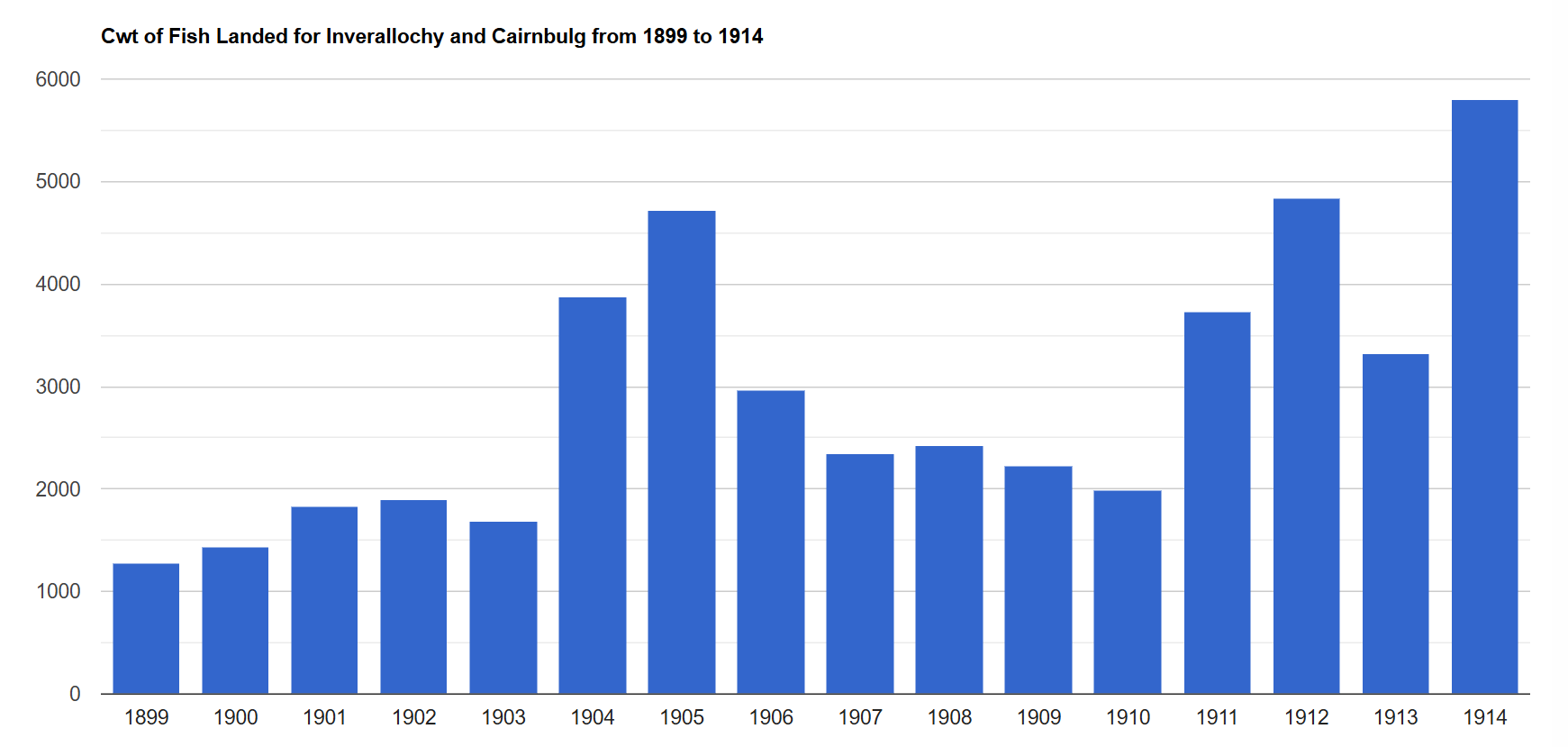
Cwt of fish landed

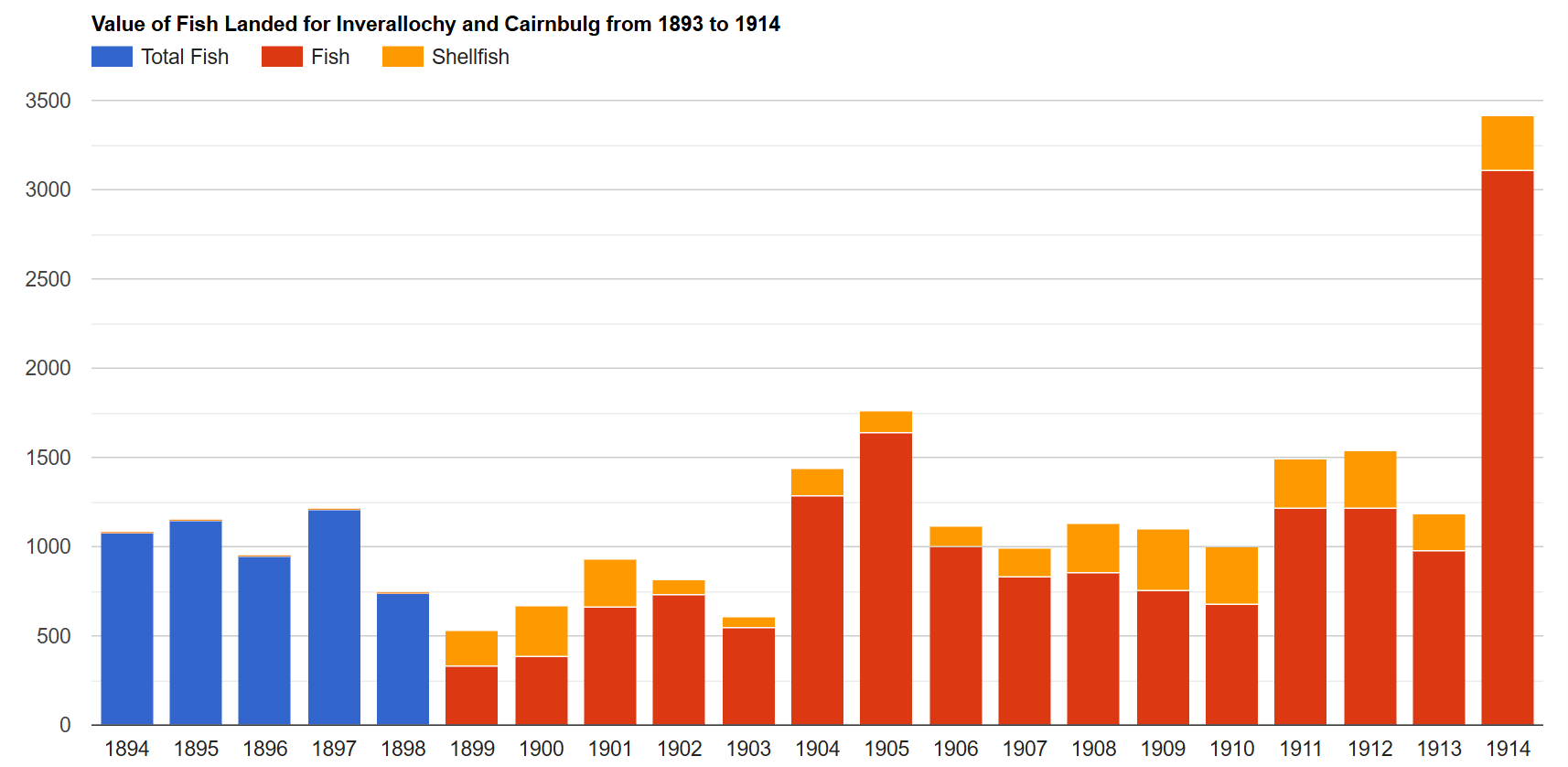
Value (£) of fish landed

== Attractions ==
Maggie's Hoosie, the former home of Maggie Duthie (1867–1950), is a preserved 19th century fishwife's cottage at 26 Shore Street. Cairnbulg harbour, built in the 1920s as a single pier, was developed in the early 1980s using WW2 tank traps to create an enclosed harbour basin.

Inverallochy School was established in 1841 as a 36 ft × 20 ft (11 m × 6 m) building that seated 88 scholars. Increased attendance demanded further funding in 1866 to seat 130 scholars and 240 in 1872. It finally re-opened in 1965 after a substantial extension to include eight new classrooms, a general purpose room, a school meal scullery, an assembly hall–gymnasium and an art room. The eight old classrooms were turned into homecraft rooms with housewifery area, science rooms and library.

The Gothic parish church dates to 1842, distinguished by its octagonal spirelet on its buttressed tower.,
