= St Combs railway station =

Railway station in Aberdeenshire, Scotland

Coordinates: 57.6576°N 1.9121°W

St. Combs
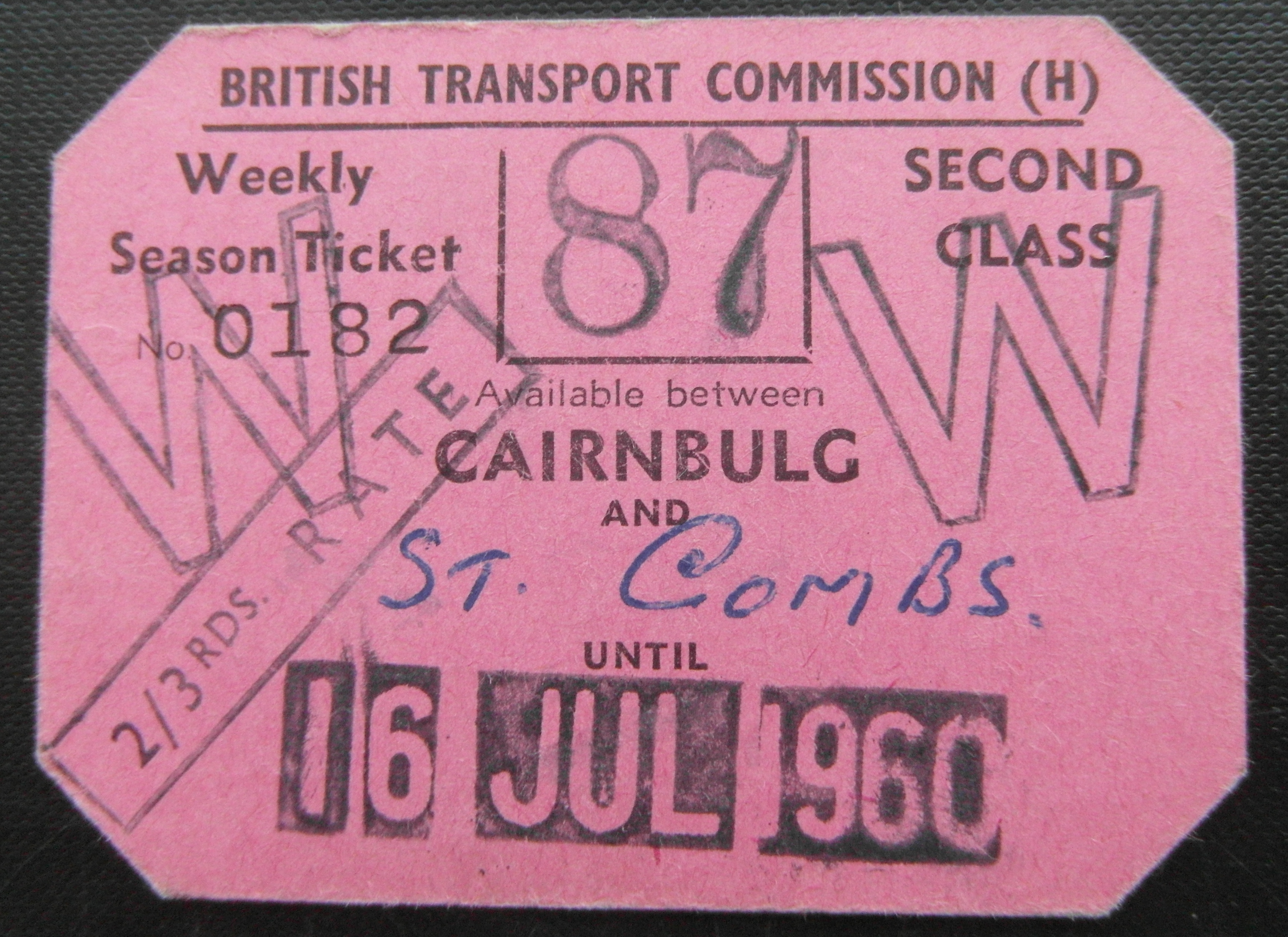
- Cairnbulg to St Combs season ticket

General information
- Location: St. Combs, Aberdeenshire; Scotland
- Grid reference: NK040650
- Platforms: 1

Other information
- Status: Disused

History
- Pre-grouping: Great North of Scotland Railway
- Post-grouping: London and North Eastern Railway

Key dates
- 1 July 1903: Opened
- 7 November 1960: Goods traffic ceased
- 3 May 1965: Closed
Location

St. Combs railway station was a station on the Fraserburgh and St Combs Light Railway, Aberdeenshire. It was opened on 1 July 1903 and stood 5 1/8 miles (8.2 km) from Fraserburgh.

== History ==
The standard gauge line from Fraserburgh to St Combs opened in 1903, and was the last line built by the Great North of Scotland Railway before it became part of the London and North Eastern Railway. The line was closed in 1965 by the Scottish Region of British Railways as part of the Beeching Cuts. The St Combs line was partly unfenced and it was therefore classified as a light railway with locomotives carrying cow catchers. The 1948 timetable shows that all trains stopped at the station.

== Infrastructure ==
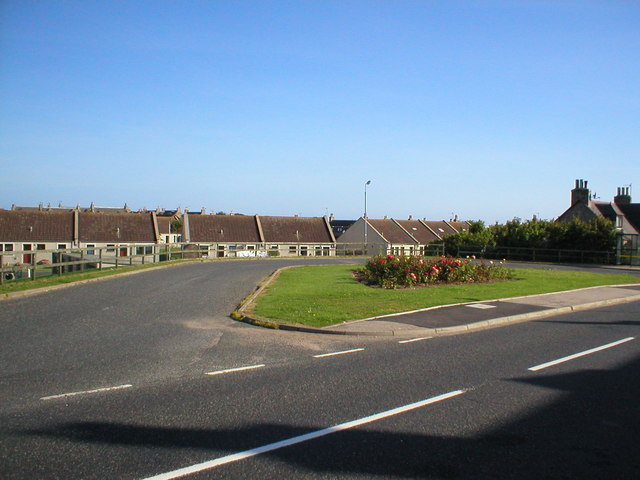
View towards the site of the old station from High Street

This single platformed terminus station stood on the seaward side of the line with a railway cottage nearby overlooking High Street. A name board and an old goods van body were located on the low platform together with a rectangular corrugated iron built ticket office, waiting room and toilets, the main building however had been demolished at some point prior to closure, probably after goods services and staffing were removed in November 1960, leaving the goods van body in use as a shelter. A camping coach was positioned here by the Scottish Region from 1956 to 1959.

The platform was built of wood with a gravel surface, similar in construction to the other stations on the route such as Kirkton Bridge Halt and Philorth Bridge Halt. The station had a passing loop for locomotives to run round the carriages and one siding running to a stone built loading dock and associated huts. The passing loop was lifted some years before the line closed. No signal box or signal posts are shown on the OS maps.

== Services ==
The line in 1910 had seven return workings on weekdays and an additional late night Saturday train from Fraserburgh that departed at 9.30pm and returned at 10pm. No Sunday services were provided on the railway. The 1964 - 1965 timetable had 11 return workings per day between Fraserburgh and St Combs with an additional service on Saturdays. The full journey to St Combs took around twenty minutes, connections for Aberdeen were available at the Fraserburgh railway station terminus. Only one class of travel was provided.

St Combs was not a request stop. The line closed to goods and was unstaffed from 7 November 1960.

== The site today ==
Almost nothing now remains of the railway infrastructure and the station site that is now occupied by a housing estate, however the stationmaster's house survives and some sections of the trackbed are in use as farm tracks on the outskirts of the village.

== Sources ==
- Butt, R. V. J. (October 1995). The Directory of Railway Stations: details every public and private passenger station, halt, platform and stopping place, past and present (1st ed.). Sparkford: Patrick Stephens Ltd. ISBN 978-1-85260-508-7. OCLC 60251199. OL 11956311M.
- Maxtone, Graham and Cooper, Mike (2018). Then and Now on the Great North. V.1. GNoSR Association. ISBN 978-0902343-30-6.
- McRae, Andrew (1998). British Railways Camping Coach Holidays: A Tour of Britain in the 1950s and 1960s. Vol. Scenes from the Past: 30 (Part Two). Foxline. ISBN 1-870119-53-3.

| Preceding station | Historical railways | Following station |
|---|---|---|
| Cairnbulg; Line and Station closed | Great North of Scotland Railway; Fraserburgh and St Combs Light Railway | Terminus |
