= Kirkton Bridge Halt railway station =

Former railway station in Scotland

Coordinates: 57.67813°N 1.99625°W

Kirkton Bridge Halt

General information
- Location: Fraserburgh, Aberdeenshire; Scotland
- Grid reference: NK041651
- Platforms: 1

Other information
- Status: Disused

History
- Pre-grouping: Great North of Scotland Railway
- Post-grouping: London and North Eastern Railway

Key dates
- July 1904: Opened as Kirton Bridge Halt
- June 1908: renamed Kirkton Bridge Platform
- 3 May 1965: Closed
Location

Kirkton Bridge Halt railway station or Kirkton Bridge Platform railway station was a request stop on the Fraserburgh and St Combs Light Railway, Aberdeenshire. It was opened in 1904 as Kirton Bridge Halt, later renamed as Kirkton Bridge Platform, on the links to serve the Fraserburgh golf course users and tourists a year after the line's other stations had opened. The 1948 timetable gives the station name as Kirkton Bridge Halt.

== History ==
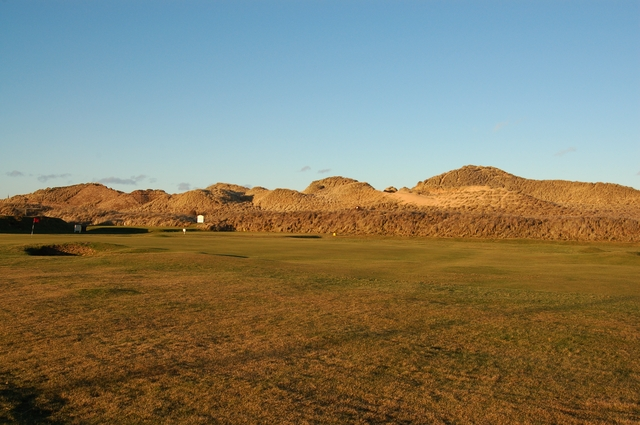
Fraserburgh Golf Course and the sand dunes

The line from Fraserburgh to St Combs itself had opened in 1903 and was the last line built by the Great North of Scotland Railway before it became part of the London and North Eastern Railway. The line was closed in 1965 by the Scottish Region of British Railways as part of the Beeching Cuts. The St Combs line was partly unfenced and it was therefore classified as a light railway and as a result the locomotives had cow catchers. The ruins of the old Church or Kirk of Philoth are located nearby, hence the name of the station.

== Infrastructure ==
The short single platformed halt stood on the west of the line just south of Kirkton Bridge with the Fraserburgh golf club house nearby, located between the St Combs branch and the Fraserburgh branch close to the point where the two lines diverged. It was accessed via a path running across the road from the clubhouse and photographs show that it was built of wood with a gravel surface. No shelter or lighting were provided and the station had no sidings or signalling. A level crossing was located nearby at the 1.6 km or 1 mile post on the running towards St Combs. White posts beside the track at the halt assisted the train driver in positioning the train in poor light conditions or after dark. The gradient running towards St Combs was 1 in 50.

== Services ==
The line in 1910 had seven return workings on weekdays and an additional late night Saturday train from Fraserburgh that departed at 9.30pm and returned at 10pm. No Sunday services were provided on the railway. The 1964 - 1965 timetable had 11 return workings per day between Fraserburgh and St Combs with an additional service on Saturdays. A journey took around twenty minutes and Kirkton Bridge was a request stop with passengers required to inform the guard if they wished to alight there. The line closed to goods on 7 November 1960, Kirkton Bridge Halt however had never handled goods.

== The site today ==
The trackbed is visible in places however nothing remains of the halt. The Fraserburgh golf clubhouse is still present.

Former Services

Preceding station	Historical railways	Following station
Fraserburgh; Line and Station closed	Great North of Scotland Railway Fraserburgh and St Combs Light Railway	Philorth Bridge Halt; Line and Station closed

== Sources ==
- Butt, R. V. J. (October 1995). The Directory of Railway Stations: details every public and private passenger station, halt, platform and stopping place, past and present (1st ed.). Sparkford: Patrick Stephens Ltd. ISBN 978-1-85260-508-7. OCLC 60251199. OL 11956311M.
- Maxtone, Graham and Cooper, Mike (2018). Then and Now on the Great North. V.1. GNoSR Association. ISBN 978-0902343-30-6.
