= St Combs =

Village in Aberdeenshire, Scotland

Coordinates: 57.6571°N 1.9107°W

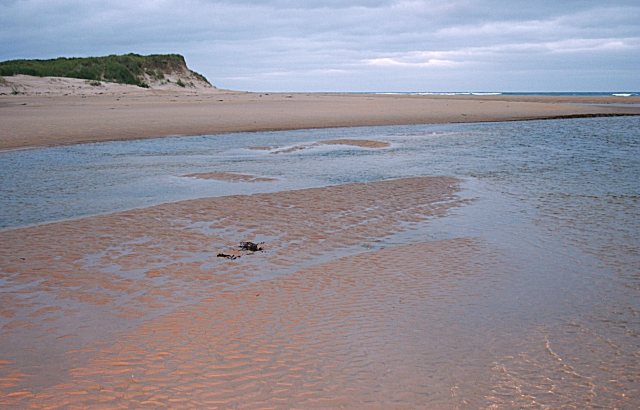
- Beach south of St Combs

- Location within Aberdeenshire
- Population: 620 (2020)
- Council area: Aberdeenshire
- Country: Scotland
- Sovereign state: United Kingdom
- Police: Scotland
- Fire: Scottish
- Ambulance: Scottish

St Combs is a small fishing village in Aberdeenshire, Scotland, immediately southeast of Inverallochy. It has existed since at least the 17th century, and takes its name from a church to St Colm (or Columba) that used to exist in the area and was abandoned in 1607. Only a fragment of it remains. The remains of Lonmay Castle are also in the area. The village sits across Loch Strathbeg from Rattray.

== History ==
There is considerable evidence of local habitation by early man in and around St Combs. Somewhat to the southwest lies the Catto Long Barrow and a number of tumuli.

The "new toon" of St Combs was laid out in 1784 by Charles Gordon of Cairness. Houses were laid out in large garden plots, gable to the street, running downhill to the shore. Lonmay Parish Church was established in 1787, and Cairness House (the work of James Playfair) followed in the 1790s.

Charlestown, just across the Mill Water and closer to the shore, was founded by the Inverallochy Estate in 1800. This was much to the chagrin of the St Combs inhabitants, who named it Sodom.

The Annual Reports of the Fishery Board for Scotland provide an insight into fishing in St Combs and Charlestown in the years before the First World War. For example, in the Report for 1910, also referring to Inverallochy and Cairnbulg we learn that "The fishermen in the southern sections of the district continue to draw good earnings from the various herring fishings, and are in a prosperous condition".

Fishery Statistics

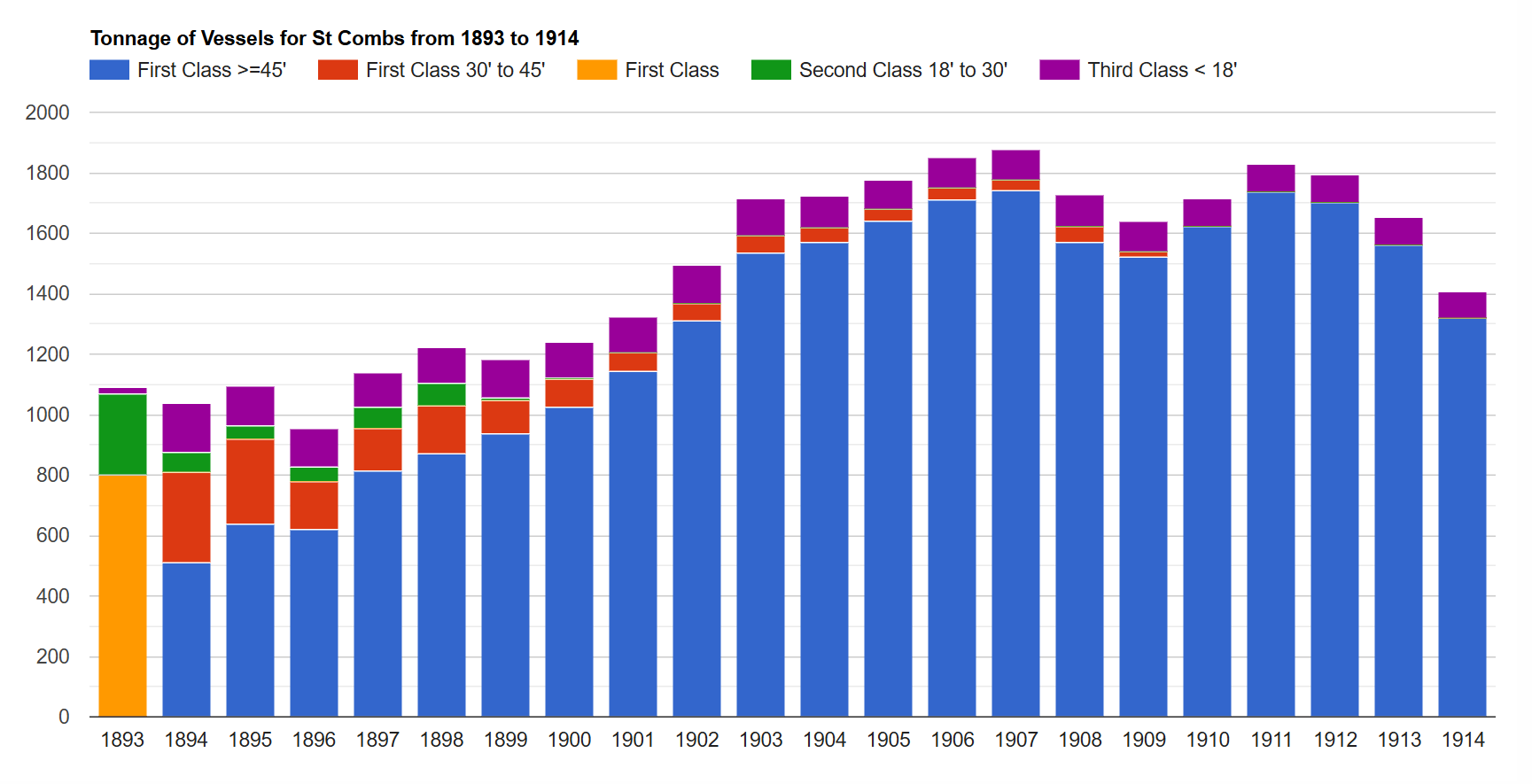
St Combs tonnage of vessels

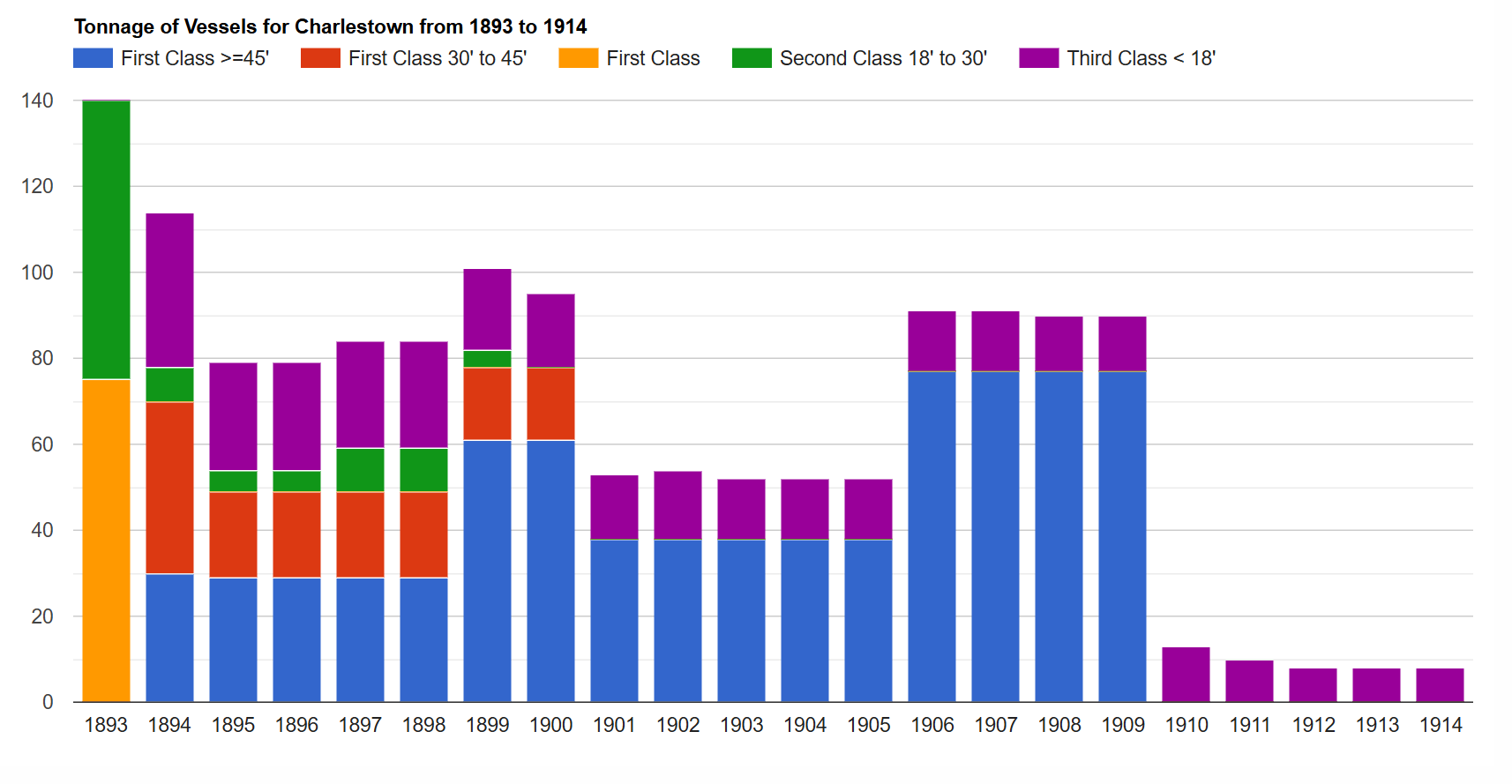
Charlestown tonnage of vessels

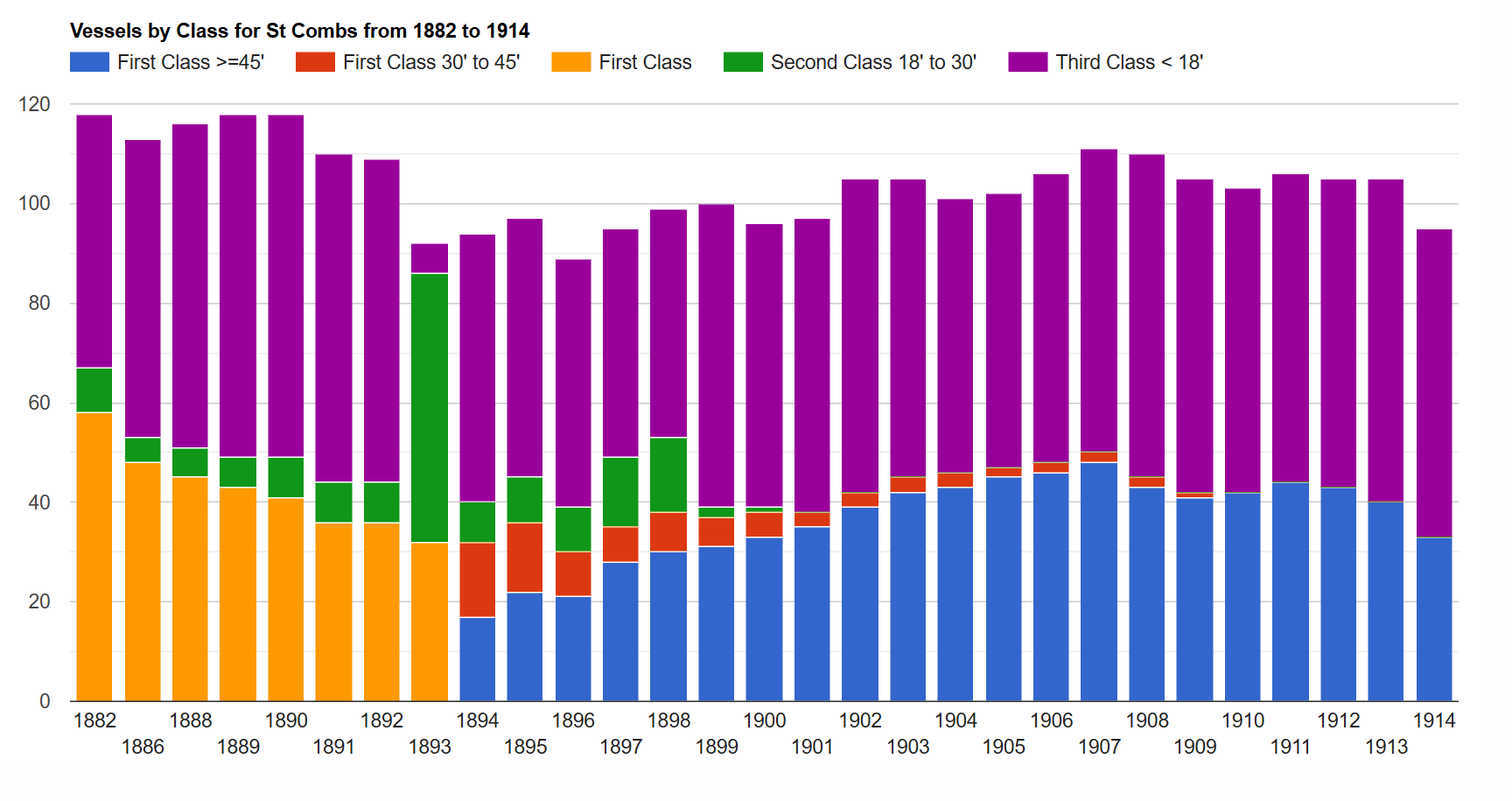
St Combs vessels by class

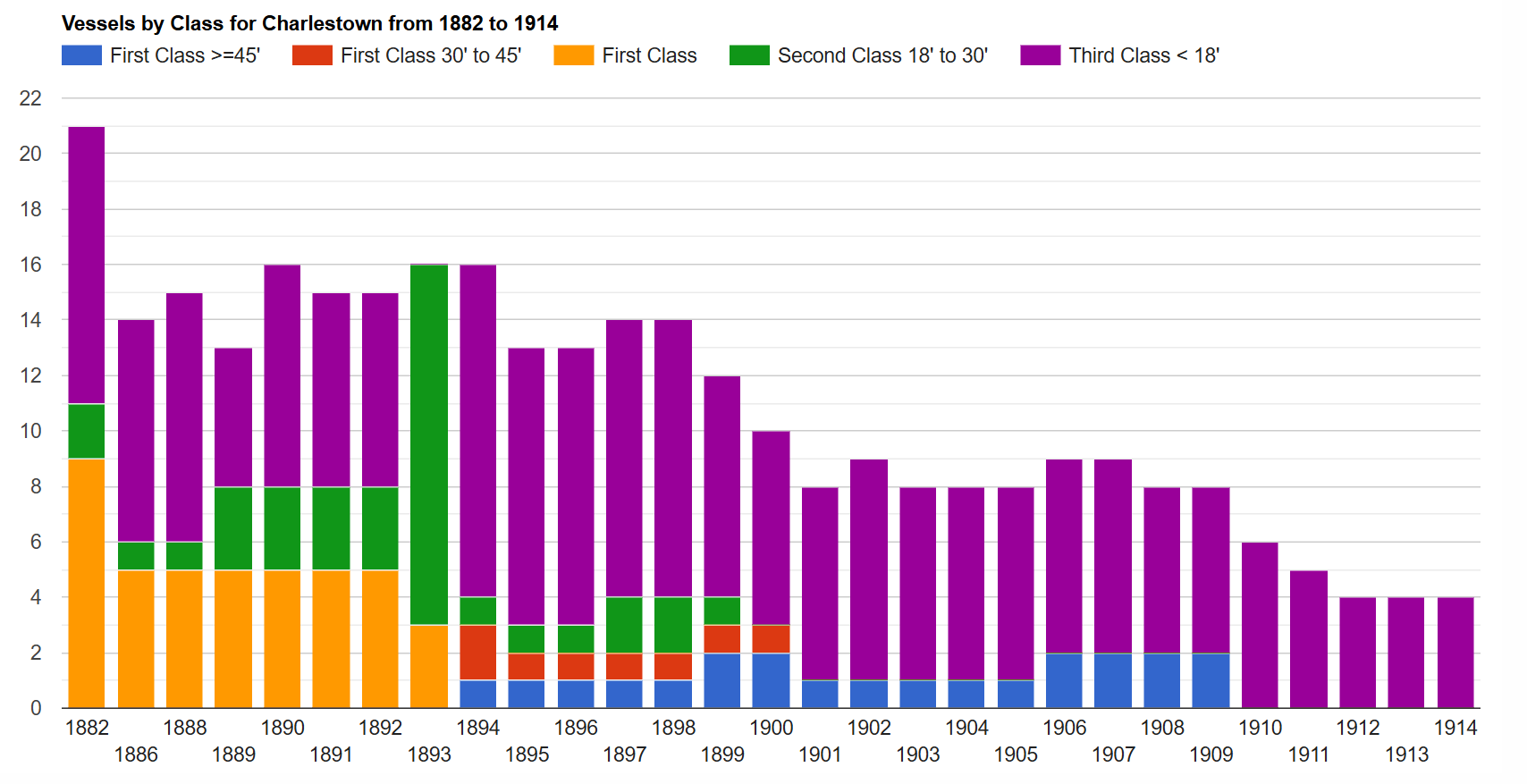
Charlestown vessels by class

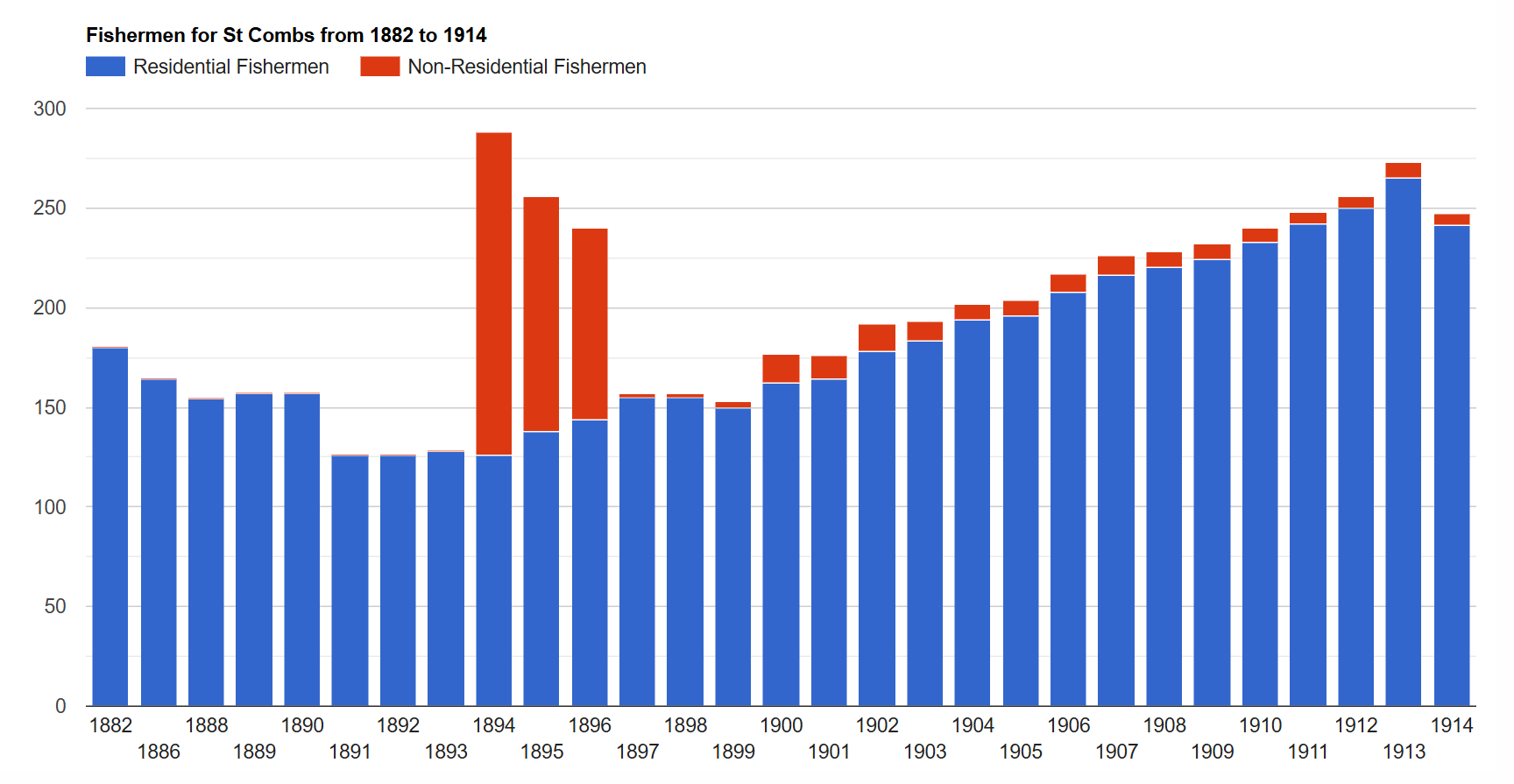
St Combs fishermen

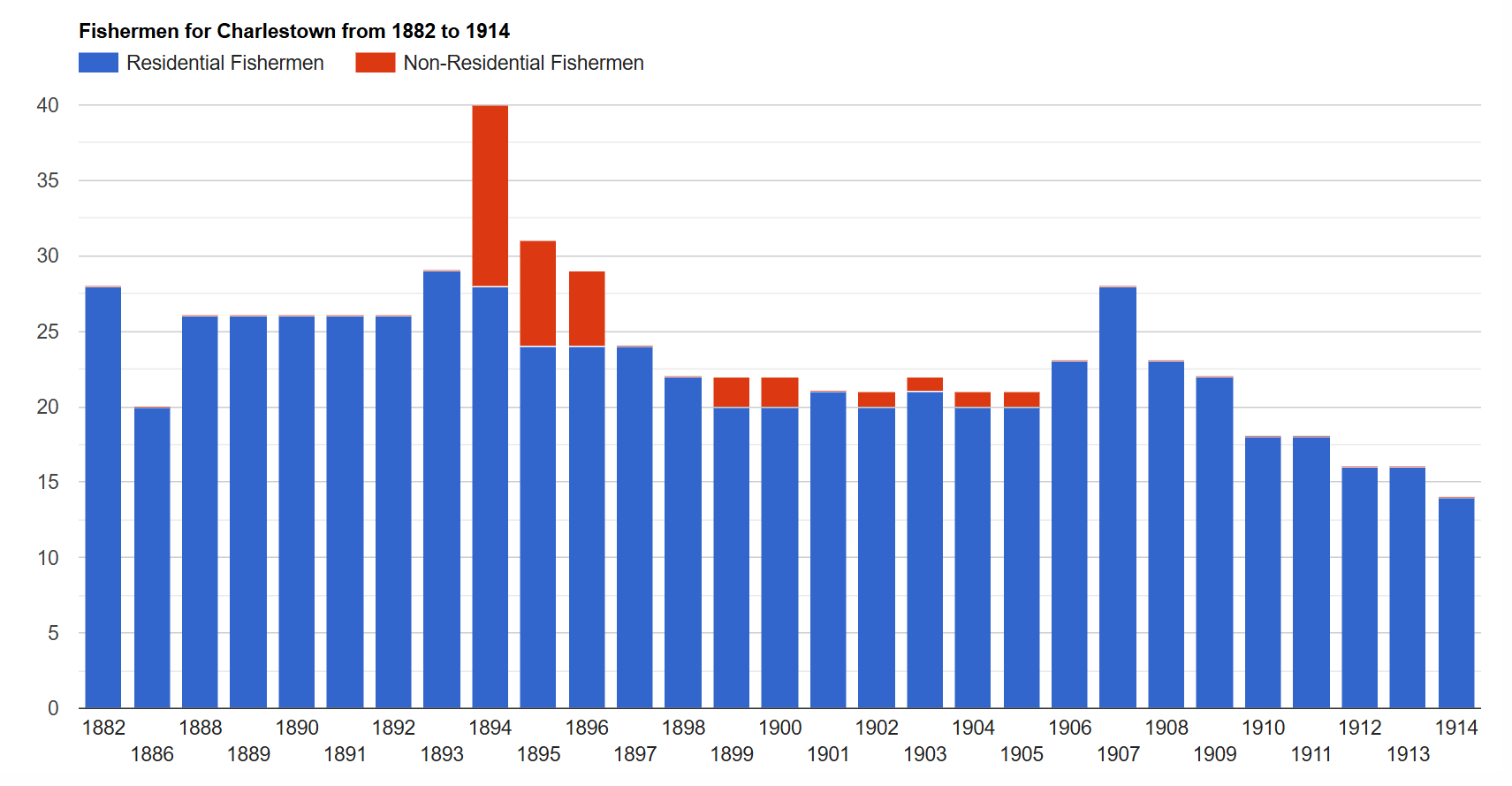
Charlestown fishermen

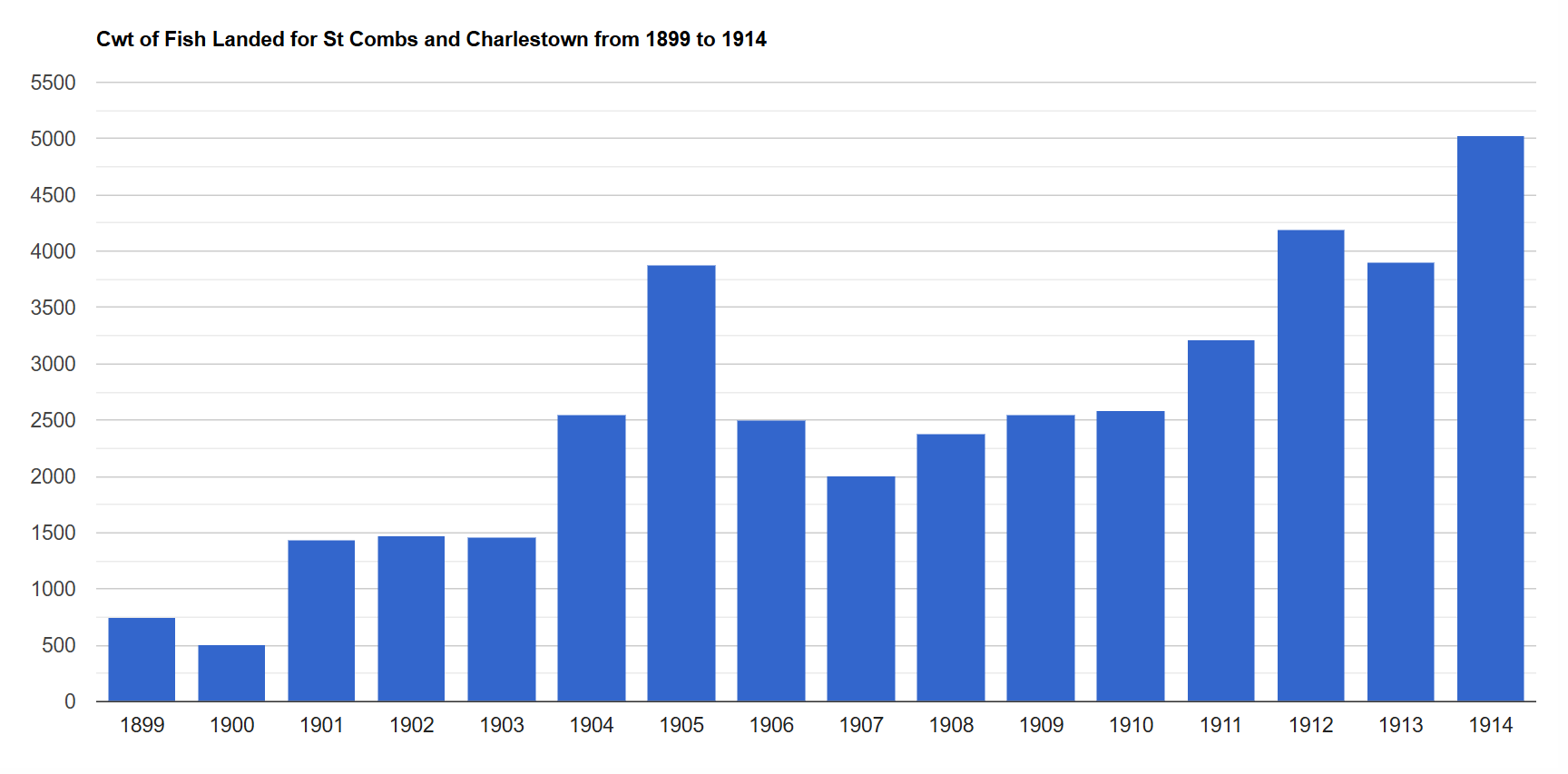
Cwt of fish landed

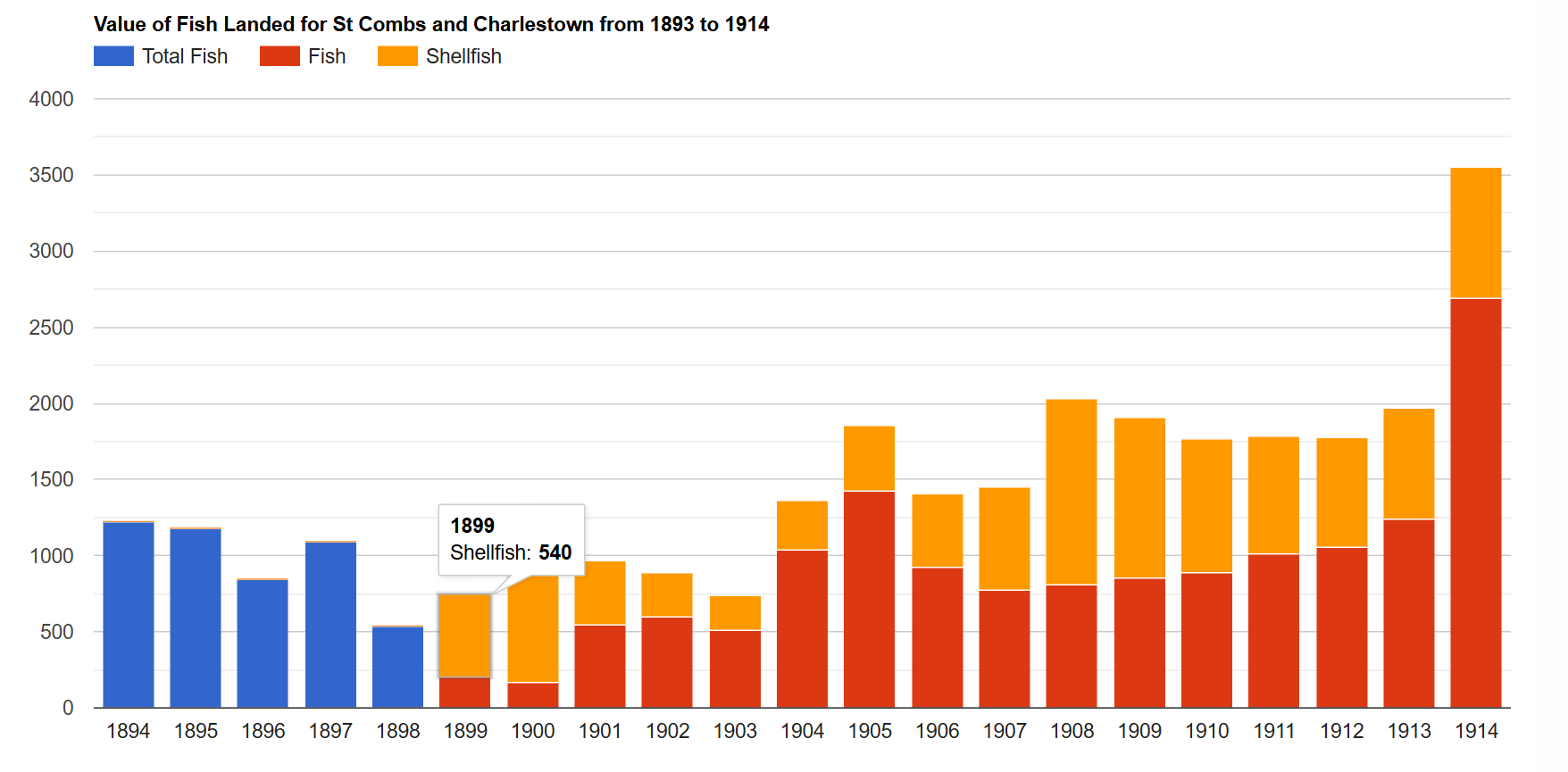
Value (£) of fish landed

St Combs railway station opened in 1903 and closed in 1965. It was the terminus of a short branch line from Fraserburgh. In 1904 Kirkton Bridge Halt railway station was opened on the line.

== Notable people ==
James Duthie 1942-2009. James Duthie was a fisherman who began to write plays at the age of 40. His plays were received with great acclaim, notably two of his plays were shown on BBC TV, namely Donal and Sally, and The Drystane Dyker. Donal and Sally starring famous Scottish actor Gerard Kelly can now be watched on youtube.

== Sources ==
- Gazetteer for Scotland: St Combs (2008)
- Historical overview of St Combs in the Gazetteer for Scotland.
- C. Michael Hogan (2008) Catto Long Barrow fieldnotes, The Modern Antiquarian
