= Philorth Halt railway station =

Disused railway station in Fraserburgh, Aberdeenshire

Coordinates: 57.6715°N 1.9901°W

Philorth Halt
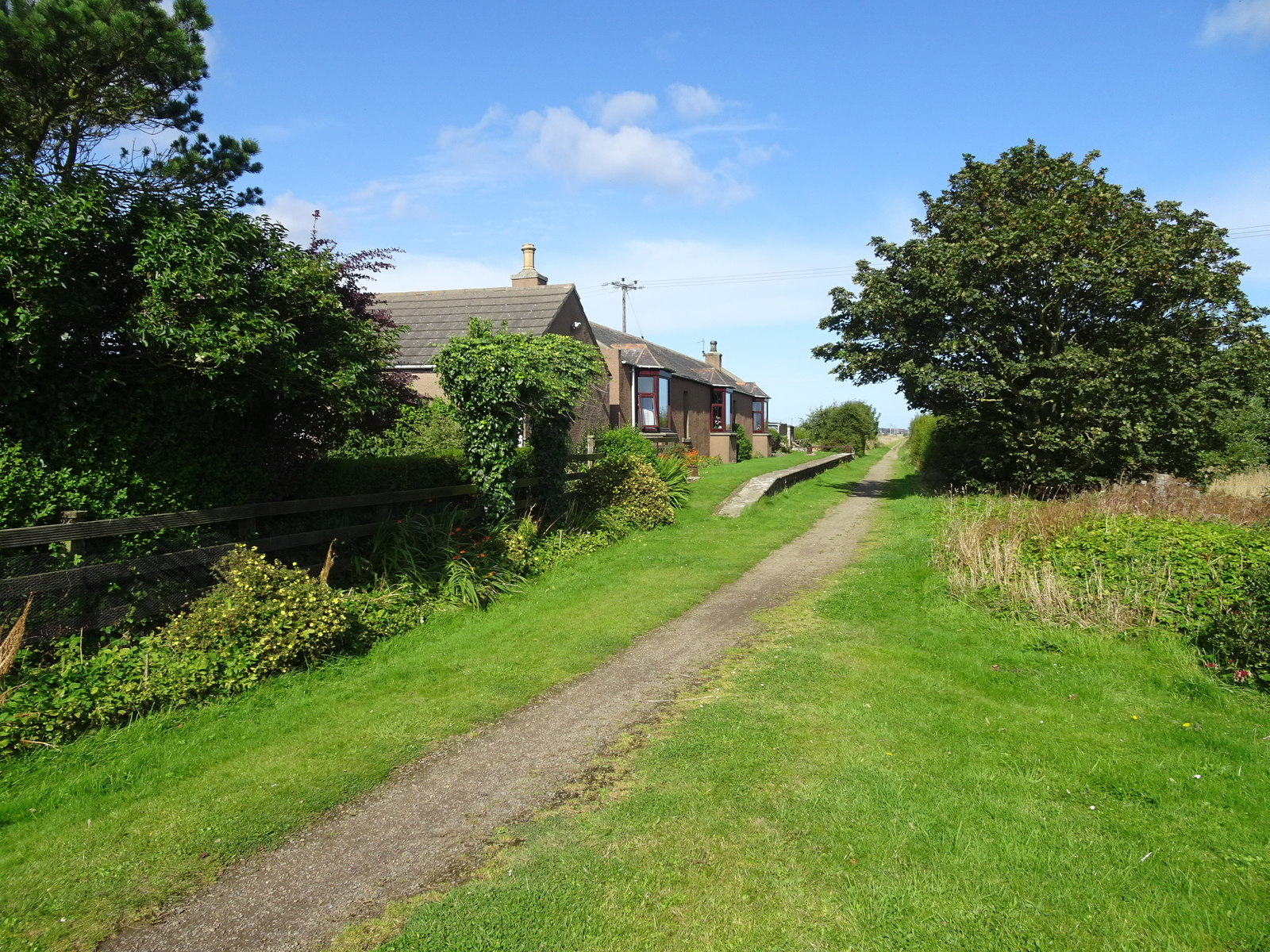
- The site of the station in 2019

General information
- Location: Fraserburgh, Aberdeenshire; Scotland
- Platforms: 1

Other information
- Status: Disused

History
- Original company: Formartine and Buchan Railway
- Pre-grouping: Great North of Scotland Railway
- Post-grouping: London and North Eastern Railway

Key dates
- 24 April 1865: Opened privately as Philorth
- 26 July 1926: Opened to the public and name changed to Philorth Halt
- 4 October 1965: Closed
Location

Philorth Halt railway station was a railway station near Philorth House, south of Fraserburgh in Aberdeenshire.

== History ==
The station was opened on 24 April 1865 by the Formartine and Buchan Railway. It was originally private and built for the residents of Philorth House. This house burned down in 1915. The station opened to the public on 26 July 1926. To the north was a siding. Passenger trains through Philorth were withdrawn on 4 October 1965 and the track lifted following the withdrawal of freight trains in 1979.

Preceding station	Disused railways	Following station
Fraserburgh; Line and station closed	Great North of Scotland Railway; Formartine and Buchan Railway	Rathen; Line and station closed
