= Fraserburgh railway station =

Disused railway station in Fraserburgh, Aberdeenshire

Coordinates: 57.6903°N 2.0038°W

Fraserburgh
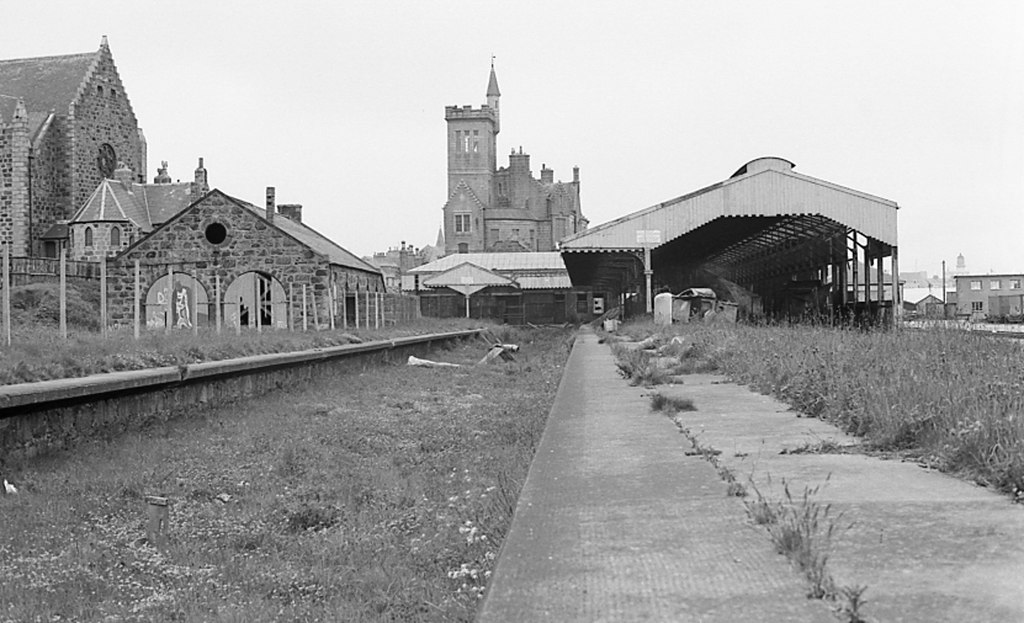
- The station in 1978

General information
- Location: Fraserburgh, Aberdeenshire; Scotland

Other information
- Status: Disused

History
- Original company: Formartine and Buchan Railway
- Pre-grouping: Great North of Scotland Railway
- Post-grouping: London and North Eastern Railway

Key dates
- 24 April 1865: Opened
- 4 October 1965: Closed to passengers
- 1979: closed completely
Location

Fraserburgh railway station is a former railway station that once served the town of Fraserburgh, Aberdeenshire.

== History ==
The station was the terminus of the Formartine and Buchan Railway from Aberdeen. The principal traffic was fish, as Fraserburgh was an important herring harbour, as well as dealing in whale products, especially whale oil.

The Fraserburgh and St Combs Light Railway opened in 1903, connecting small harbours on the coast from St Combs. These lines, and the station, are now closed, and the site has been redeveloped.

Fraserburgh railway station opened on 24 April 1865 and closed to passengers on 4 October 1965. It was known as Fraserburgh for Rosehearty and New Aberdour in Bradshaw until 1938. The railway line was built by the Formartine and Buchan Railway Company, which became part of the Great North of Scotland Railway. In 1923 the GNSR was incorporated into the London and North Eastern Railway, which was in turn nationalised on 1 January 1948. Passenger services on the Buchan lines were withdrawn in 1965 as part of the Beeching cuts. Freight trains continued to operate Fraserburgh until 1979. The track was subsequently lifted. The closest operating station is currently Inverurie.

There currently are proposals to reopen the former Formartine and Buchan railway with a proposed station at Fraserburgh.

Preceding station	Disused railways	Following station
Terminus	Great North of Scotland Railway; Formartine and Buchan Railway	Philorth; Line and station closed
Terminus	Great North of Scotland Railway; Formartine and Buchan Railway; Fraserburgh and St Combs Light Railway	Kirkton Bridge Halt; Line and station closed
