= Fraserburgh and St Combs Light Railway =

Former railway line in Scotland

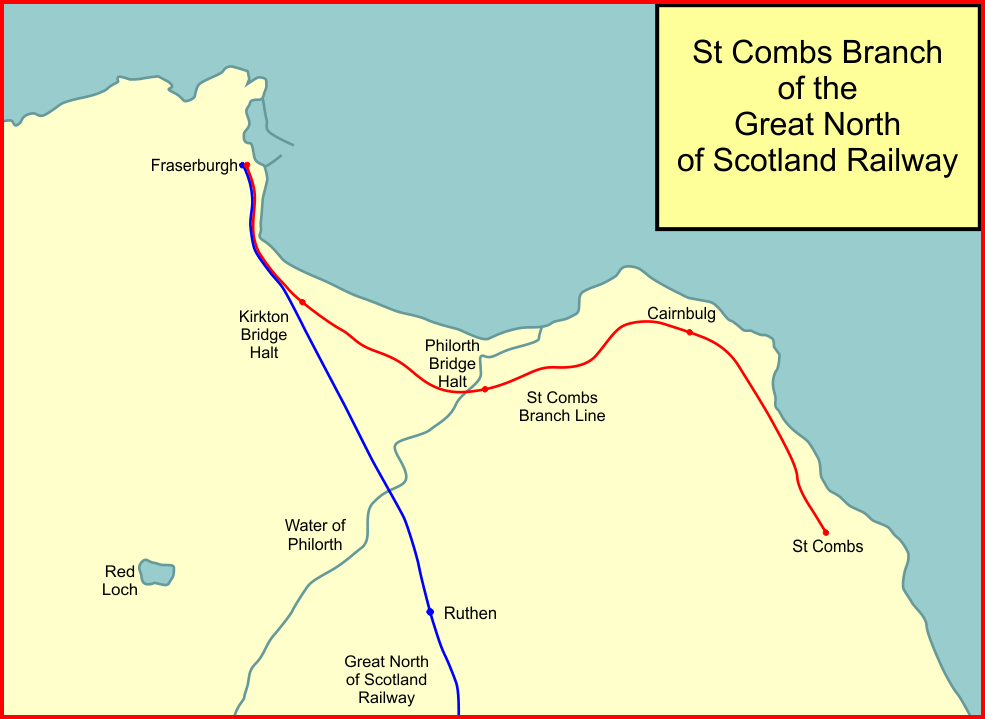

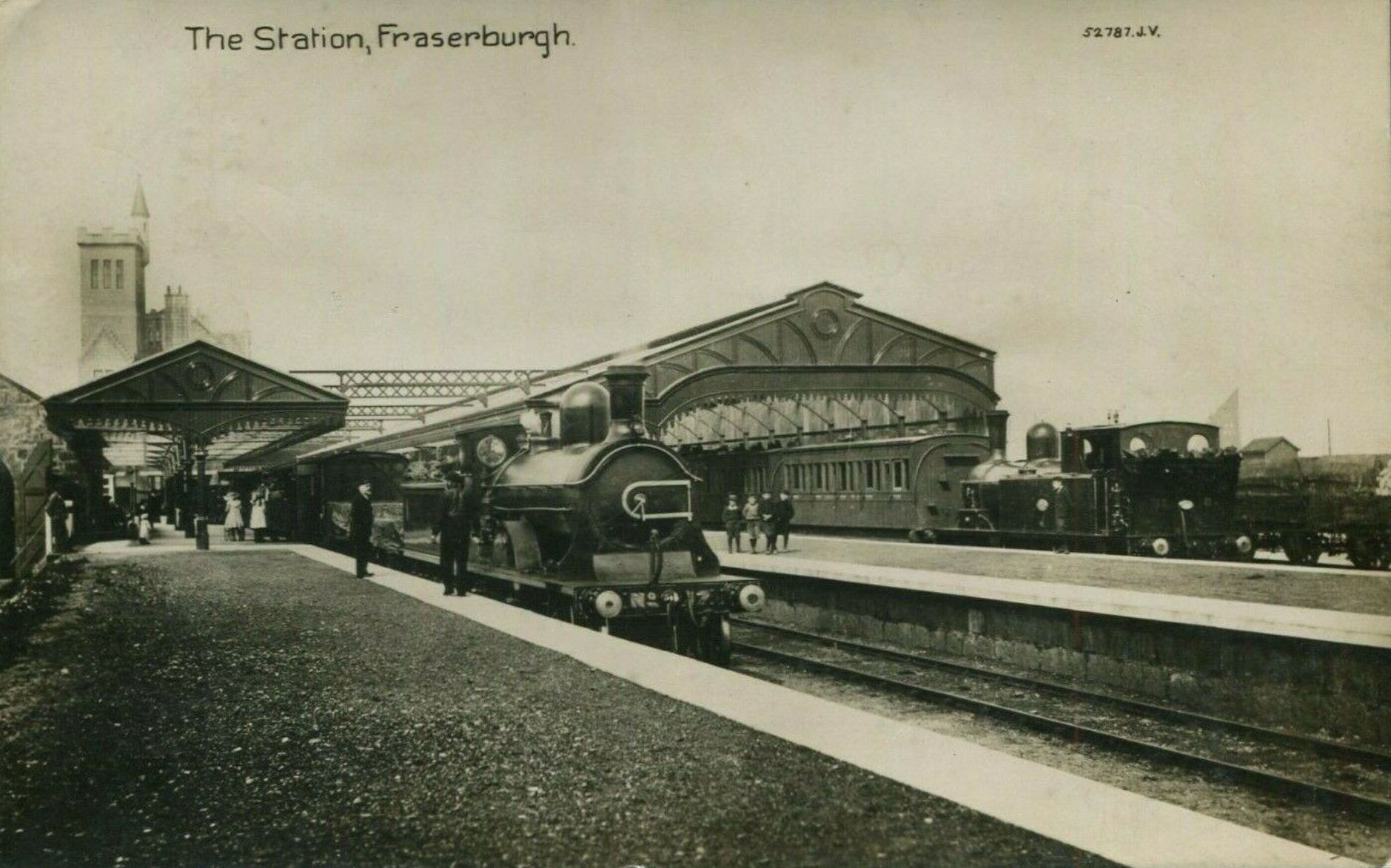
- Fraserburgh station; the St Combs train is on the right

Overview
- Parent company: Great North of Scotland Railway
- Locale: Scotland
- Dates of operation: 1903–1965

The Fraserburgh and St Combs Light Railway was a short railway branch line built in Aberdeenshire, Scotland, to serve fishing harbours. It was built by the Great North of Scotland Railway (GNoSR), and it connected with the GNoSR at Fraserburgh.

It opened in 1903. An unusual feature was that, as the line was partly unfenced, the locomotives were required to be fitted with cowcatchers, an arrangement rarely found in United Kingdom practice. The cowcatchers were provided to protect the train in the event of collision with large animals.

Improved roads and the rise of efficient road transport led to steeply declining use of the line, and it closed completely in 1965.

== The Buchan lines ==
In 1865 the Formartine and Buchan Railway was completed, connecting Fraserburgh and Peterhead to Aberdeen. Although the Formartine company was nominally independent, it was heavily supported by the Great North of Scotland Railway, which was based in Aberdeen. The Formartine and Buchan Railway was absorbed by the GNoSR in 1865, and the network of the company became known as "the Buchan lines".

The major industries in Fraserburgh were fishing, and whaling, and the Buchan Lines railway was deeply engaged in the transport of the fish catch to London markets. Whale oil and seal oil went to Dundee, where it was heavily used in jute processing. There were other fishing harbours along the coast near Fraserburgh, but the catches brought ashore there were small, and the poor roads made it difficult for the catch to be taken to market.

Towards the end of the nineteenth century, steam drifters were increasingly used in fishing, and compared with the former sailing vessels, they increased their catch considerably. This benefitted masters working out of smaller ports like Inverallochy and St Combs, that had previously landed insignificant volumes, but they now required improved transport to get to market.

== A light railway ==
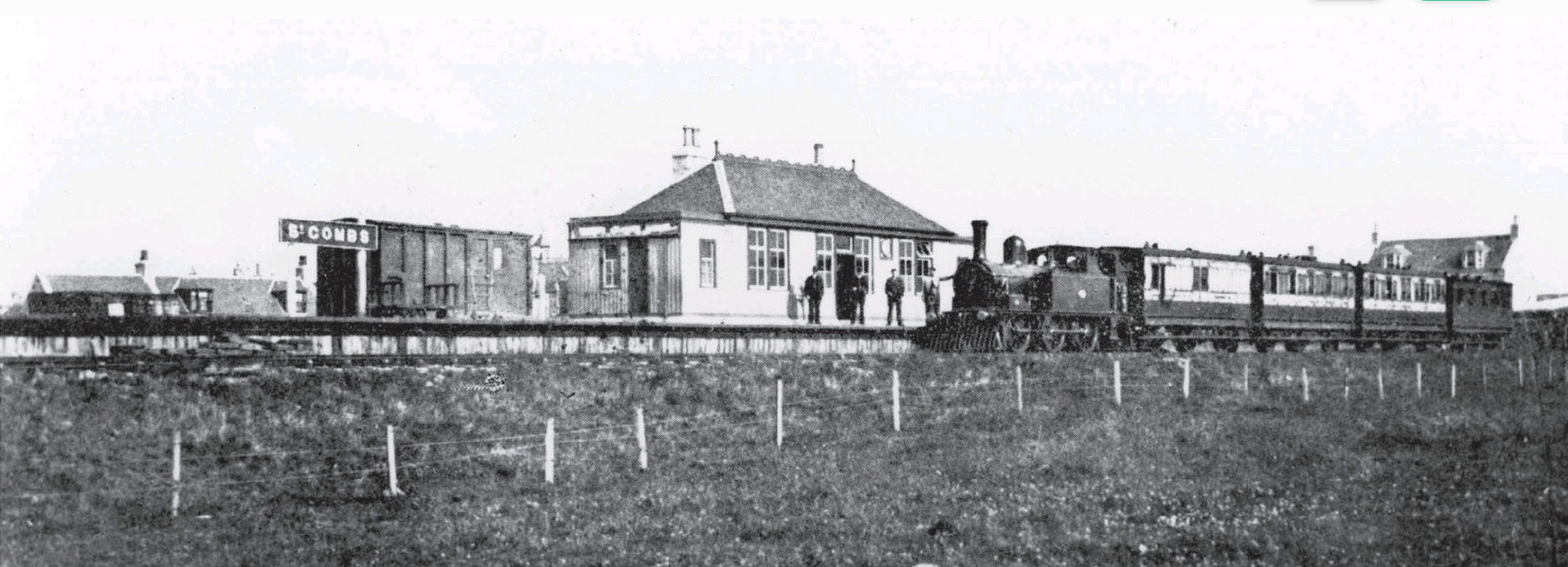
St Combs station in 1905

In 1896 the Light Railways Act was passed, enabling local railways to be constructed and operated more cheaply than traditional railways. Lonmay District Council was quick to urge the construction of a light railway, discussing the potential benefits with other adjacent councils in December 1896.

Items at the finance committee meeting of the GNoSR in August 1897 included light railways, and such a line from Fraserburgh to St Combs seemed to be viable; the line was the principal item discussed, having secured a special advance of £5,000 from the Treasury. Its promoters were offering free land but no cash, and they asked the GNoSR to provide £9,000 and to construct and work the line. The company agreed, providing that the terms of the required light railway order were acceptable.

At a shareholders' general meeting early in 1898 Lord Saltoun argued against the St. Combs railway, believing that the fisherfolk should gravitate from their villages to the towns, and saying the line was "virtually doing mischief", but the meeting gave the plan its approval. The Fraserburgh and St. Combs Light Railway Order 1899 was confirmed on 8 September 1899, authorising construction of the line. Five years were given for completion of the 4 miles 514 yards.

== Opening and operation ==
Although no major engineering features were required, the five mile line was not opened until 1 July 1903.

The Peterhead Sentinel newspaper announcing the opening of the line said that the line skirted the road all the way from where it left the main line near Fraserburgh to Philorth Water, and passengers could board at any point.

The estimated cost of the works was £16,444, towards which the Treasury contributed £5,000. The order did not require the railway to be fenced. Instead, it was stipulated that engines in regular use on the line were to be fitted with cowcatchers in front, and at both ends if no turntables were provided, which was the case. An unusual feature was a clause authorising the use of electric traction. Had advantage been taken of these powers, the line would have been an example, unique in Great Britain, of a type of rural electric railway that became common on the Continent of Europe. However, steam traction was chosen.

For the most part, the railway was laid on the surface of the ground, across sandy links of little value. The gradient undulates with frequent changes, some as steep as 1 in 50 and 1 in 60. For about half a mile from Fraserburgh, it ran parallel to the existing main line. As the branch was to be worked by one engine in steam, no signals or crossing loops were provided, apart from a run round for engines at St Combs.

Fraserburgh station was rebuilt for the opening of the St Combs line in 1903. The unstaffed halts at Kirkton Bridge and Philorth Bridge had short timber platforms without any buildings or even nameboards, but single platforms with sidings for goods traffic were provided at Cairnbulg and St Combs. The line was worked by one engine in steam, and there were no signals.

The first timetable showed six trains in each direction, of which several were mixed (conveying goods wagons as well as passenger vehicles). The train service was soon enhanced with an additional late train on Saturday evenings and a Wednesday working. At first, 17 minutes were allowed for the five-mile journey, but this schedule was increased to 20 minutes, to allow time for ticket collection.

== Railcars ==
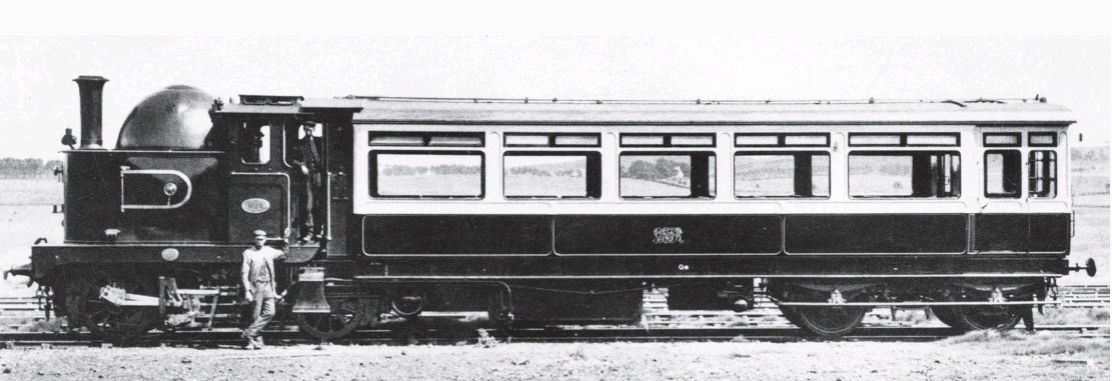
Gnosr railmotor (or railcar) no 29 in 1905

In 1905, the GNoSR introduced two experimental steam railcars in service. Each consisted of an adapted passenger coach that was supported at one end on a miniature four-wheel steam engine. Because of the limited space available, the engines had vertical dome-topped boilers, supplied by Cochran & Co., of Annan –the first of their kind to be used for railway work. The carriage part had saloon-type bodies, with seats for 45 passengers. There was a small guard’s compartment, which was fitted with duplicate engine and brake controls, used by the driver when the car was travelling with the engine in the rear. The overall length of the vehicle was 50 ft and the weight in working order 47 tons. The cars were given locomotive numbers 29 and 31.

They had been tried first of all on the Aberdeen suburban services; they were unsuccessful there, and it was thought that the shorter runs and less intensive working was mor suitable for them. One was used on the St Combs branch line and the other went to Lossiemouth.

They failed completely to justify claims made for them; the small boilers were incapable of maintaining adequate steam pressure, and they were noisy and uncomfortable in motion. Within two years, both had been withdrawn from service. The coaches were converted into third class saloons, and the engines adapted for shunting duties at Inverurie works. The latter did not long survive in this form, although the boilers were used for stationary work for several years.

== Letter boxes ==
From 18 May 1910 buses on four routes were fitted with postal letter-boxes, a feature unique at that time. The success of this arrangement led to the placing of a letter box on the brake van of the 5.40 pm St. Combs-Fraserburgh train from October 1910. The initiative came from the Post Office, which proposed a charge of £1 per box per annum; the GNS settled for £2.

== Funeral trains ==
For some years the LNER ran funeral trains from Philorth Bridge Halt, where there was a cemetery used by local people. The train used was the 1:40 pm ordinary train from St Combs to Fraserburgh; After arrival it returned to the halt to convey the mourners back to Cairnbulg; there was a loop there where the engine could run round.

== Diesel traction ==
In June 1959, multiple-unit diesel trains took over all the passenger services on the Buchan lines, including the St Combs branch.

== Paytrains ==
From 7 November 1960 tickets were issued on the train, and the staff at the stations were withdrawn.

== Closure ==
The general improvement in the road network and the availability of more convenient and flexible road transport led to an inevitable decline in the use made of the St Combs branch. It closed to all traffic on 3 May 1965.

== Locations ==
- Fraserburgh; main line terminus; opened 24 April 1865; closed 4 October 1965;
- Kirkton Bridge; opened June 1904, mainly for golfers; closed 3 May 1965;
- Philorth Bridge; opened 1 July 1903; closed 3 May 1965;
- Inverallochy; opened 1 July 1903; renamed Cairnbulg 1 August 1903; closed 3 May 1965;
- St Combs; opened 1 July 1903; closed 3 May 1965.
