= Fife Council =

Scottish unitary authority council in Fife, Scotland

- Full council election every 5 years.
- Coat of arms

- Council logo

Type
- Type: Unitary authority

Leadership
- Provost: Jim Leishman, Labour since 17 May 2012
- Leader: David Ross, Labour since 20 February 2014 (Note: Joint leader with David Alexander of SNP between 2017 and 2022)
- Chief Executive: Ken Gourlay since July 2023

Structure
- Seats: 75
- Graph of the party split among 75 seats.
- Political groups: Administration (19) Labour (19) Support (16) Liberal Democrats (13) Conservative (3) Other parties (40) SNP (34) Reform (2) Independent (4)

Elections
- Voting system: Single transferable vote
- Last election: 5 May 2022
- Next election: 6 May 2027

Meeting place
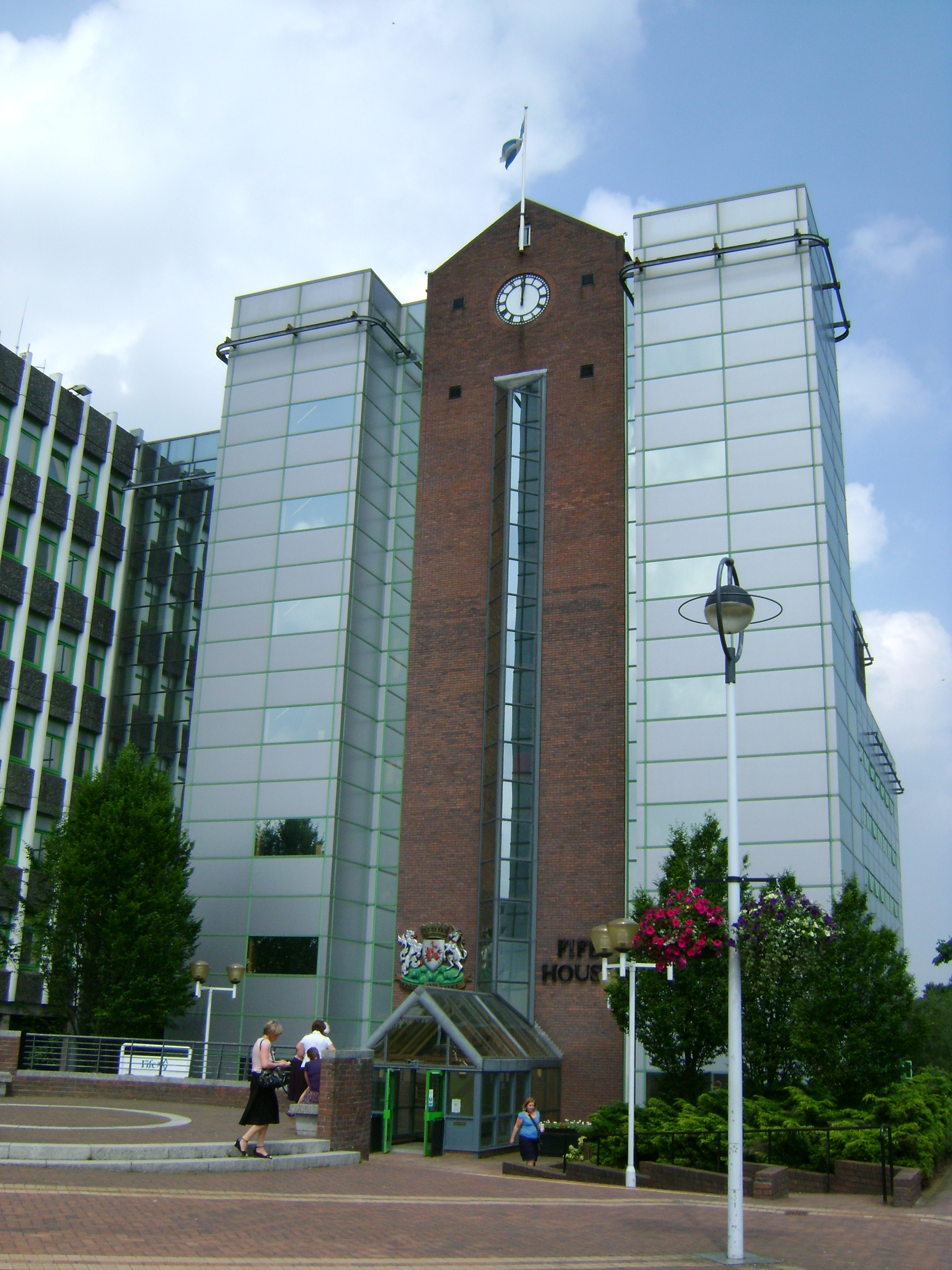
- Fife House, North Street, Glenrothes, KY7 5LT

Website
- www.fife.gov.uk

Fife Council is the local authority for Fife, one of the 32 council areas of Scotland. The council is based at Fife House in Glenrothes. It has been under no overall control since 2003, and has been led by a Labour minority administration since the last election in 2022.

== History ==
Fife was one of Scotland's historic counties, with a Fife County Council existing from 1890 to 1975. In 1975, Fife became a region with three lower-tier district councils: Dunfermline, Kirkcaldy, and North-East Fife. The regions and districts were abolished in 1996, when Fife became a council area, governed by Fife Council.

== Political control ==
The council has been under no overall control since 2003. Following the 2022 election, the Scottish National Party were the largest group on the council, but a Labour minority administration was formed with informal support from the Liberal Democrats and Conservatives.

The first election to Fife Regional Council was held in 1974, initially operating as a shadow authority alongside the outgoing authorities until the new system came into force on 16 May 1975. A shadow authority was again elected in 1995 ahead of the change to council areas which came into force on 1 April 1996. Political control since 1975 has been as follows:

Fife Regional Council

Party in control	Years
Labour	1975–1996

Fife Council

Party in control	Years
Labour	1996–2003
No overall control	2003–present

=== Leadership ===
A Provost of Fife is elected from among the councillors. The provost chairs full council meetings and acts as ceremonial head of the council. The current provost is former football manager Jim Leishman, who was first elected to the post in May 2012 and subsequently re-elected in 2017 and 2022.

Political leadership is provided by the leader of the council. The leaders since 1996 have been:

Councillor	Party	From	To	Notes
Alex Rowley	Labour	1 April 1996	1998	
Christine May	Labour	1998	2003	
Anne McGovern	Labour	2003	2007	
Peter Grant	SNP	2007	2012	
Alex Rowley	Labour	2012	20 Feb 2014	
David Ross	Labour	20 Feb 2014	May 2017	
David Alexander	SNP	May 2017	May 2022	Co-leaders
David Ross	Labour	May 2017	May 2022	Co-leaders
David Ross	Labour	19 May 2022		

=== Composition ===
Following the 2022 election and subsequent by-elections and changes of allegiance up to August 2026, the composition of the council was:

Party	Seats
SNP	34
Labour	19
Liberal Democrats	13
Conservative	3
Reform	2
Independent	4
Total	75

Two of the independent councillors sit together as the "Fife Independent Group". The next full council election is due in 2027.

== Premises ==
Fife Council is based at Fife House on North Street, Glenrothes. The building was built in 1969 for the Glenrothes Development Corporation, and became headquarters of Fife Regional Council on its creation in 1975. Prior to 1975 the old Fife County Council had been based at County Buildings, Cupar. Fife House passed to the new Fife Council on local government reorganisation in 1996.

== Elections ==
Since 2007 elections have been held every five years under the single transferable vote system, introduced by the Local Governance (Scotland) Act 2004. Election results since 1995 have been as follows:

Year	Seats	SNP	Labour	Liberal Democrats	Conservative	Independent / Other	Notes
1995	92	9	54	25	0	4	
1999	78	9	43	21	1	4	New ward boundaries.
2003	78	11	36	23	2	6	
2007	78	23	24	21	5	5	New ward boundaries.
2012	78	26	35	10	3	4	
2017	75	29	24	7	15	0	New ward boundaries.
2022	75	34	20	13	8	0	

=== Wards ===
Map of Fife's wards, using 2017 boundaries

Ward number	Ward	Location in Fife	Seats	Largest settlement	Other settlements
1	West Fife and Coastal Villages		3	Kincardine	Blairhall, Bowershall, Cairneyhill, Carnock, Comrie, Culross, Gowkhall, Oakley, Saline, Steelend, Torryburn, Valleyfield
2	Dunfermline North		3	Dunfermline	Kingseat, Townhill, Wellwood
3	Dunfermline Central		4	Dunfermline	Crossford, Halbeath
4	Dunfermline South		4	Dunfermline	
5	Rosyth		3	Rosyth	Charlestown, Comrie, Limekilns
6	Inverkeithing and Dalgety Bay		4	Dalgety Bay	Aberdour, Hillend, Jamestown, Inverkeithing, North Queensferry
7	Cowdenbeath		4	Cowdenbeath	Crossgates, Hill of Beath, Kelty
8	Lochgelly, Cardenden and Benarty		4	Lochgelly	Ballingry, Cardenden, Crosshill Glencraig, Lochore, Lumphinnans
9	Burntisland, Kinghorn and Western Kirkcaldy		3	Burntisland	Auchtertool, Kinghorn, Western Kirkcaldy
10	Kirkcaldy North		3	Kirkcaldy	
11	Kirkcaldy Central		3	Kirkcaldy	
12	Kirkcaldy East		3	Kirkcaldy	
13	Glenrothes West and Kinglassie		3	Glenrothes	Kinglassie
14	Glenrothes North, Leslie and Markinch		4	Glenrothes	Cadham, Leslie, Markinch, Milton of Balgonie, Star
15	Glenrothes Central and Thornton		3	Glenrothes	Coaltown of Balgonie, Thornton
16	Howe of Fife and Tay Coast		3	Newburgh	Auchtermuchty, Balmalcolm, Collessie, Creich, Falkland, Freuchie, Gateside, Kilmany, Kingskettle, Ladybank, Letham, Lindores, Logie, Luthrie, Strathmiglo
17	Tay Bridgehead		3	Newport-on-Tay	Balmerino, Balmullo, Bottomcraig, Gauldry, Guardbridge, Leuchars, Pickletillum, Tayport, Woodhaven, Wormit
18	St Andrews		4	St Andrews	Strathkinness
19	East Neuk and Landward		3	Anstruther	Abercrombie, Arncroach, Boarhills, Carnbee, Cellardyke, Colinsburgh, Crail, Dunino, Elie and Earlsferry, Kilconquhar, Kilrenny, Kingsbarns, Largoward, Lathones, Pittenweem, St Monans
20	Cupar		3	Cupar	Blebo Craigs, Ceres, Cults, Cupar Muir, Dairsie, Kemback, Pitlessie, Pitscottie, Springfield, Stratheden
21	Leven, Kennoway and Largo		4	Leven	Baintown, Balcurvie, Bonnybank, Cameron Bridge, Drumeldrie, Kennoway, Lower Largo, Lundin Links, Upper Largo, Windygates
22	Buckhaven, Methil and Wemyss Villages		4	Methil	Buckhaven, Coaltown of Wemyss, East Wemyss, West Wemyss
