= List of places in Fife =

Map of places in Fife compiled from this list

This list of places in Fife is a list of links for any town, village, hamlet, castle, golf course, mansion, hillfort, lighthouse, nature reserve, reservoir, river, and other places of interest in the Fife council area of Scotland.

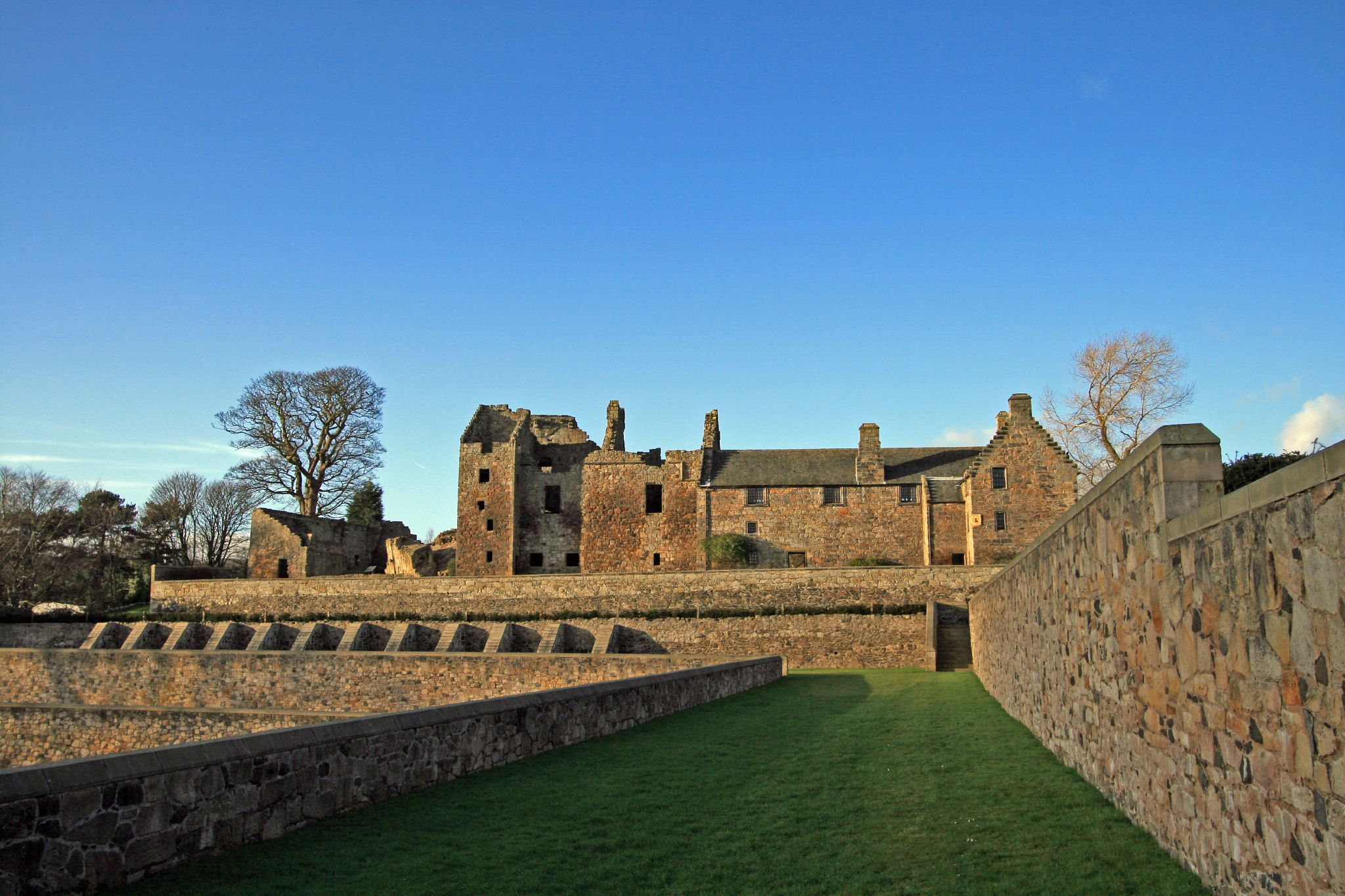
Aberdour Castle

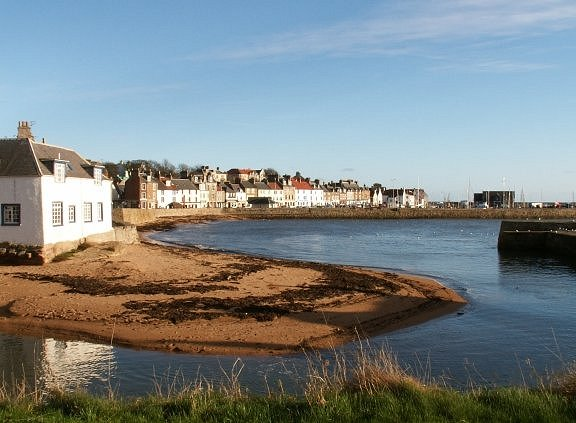
Anstruther

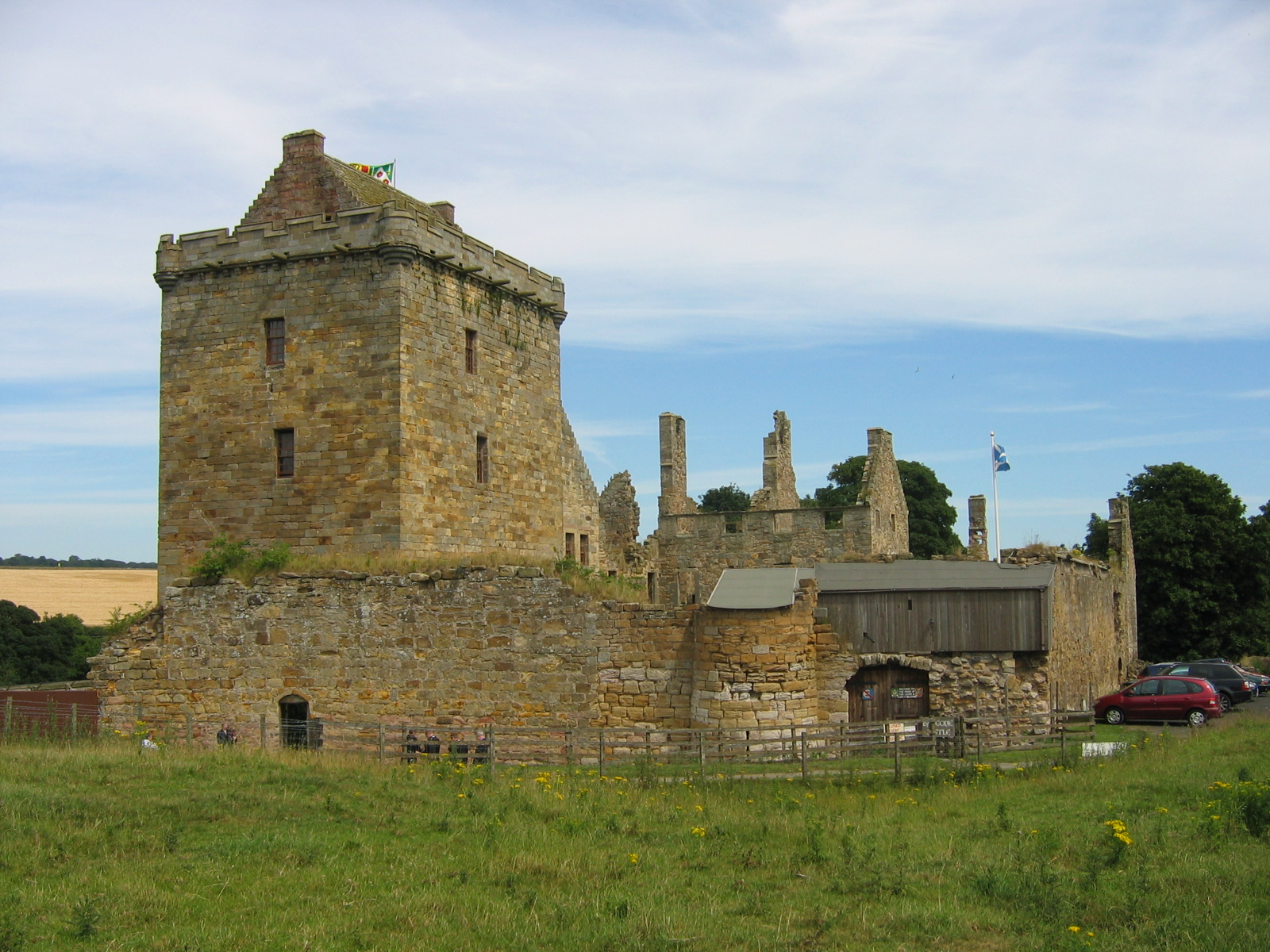
Balgonie Castle

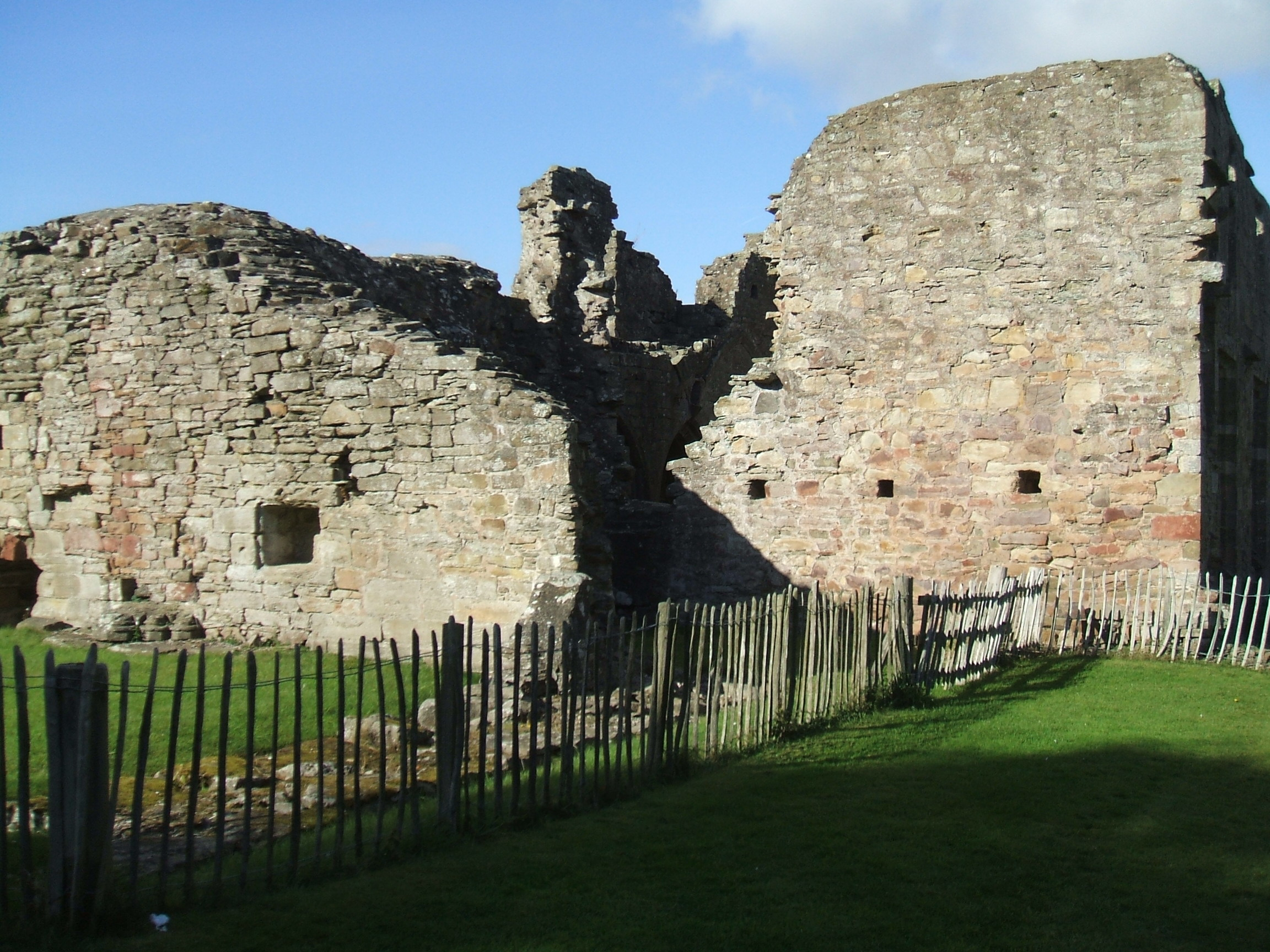
Balmerino Abbey

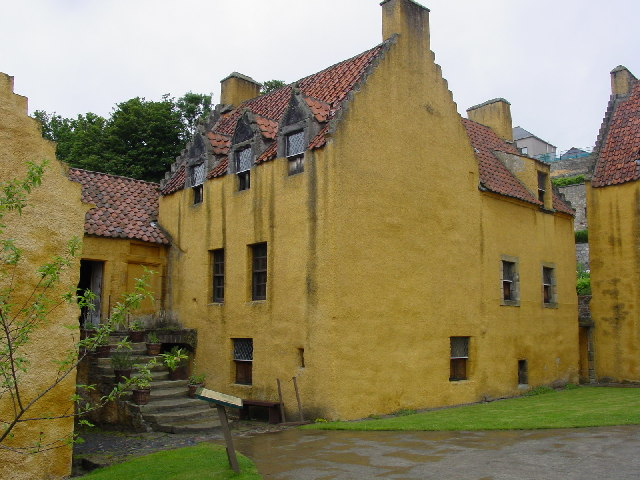
Culross Palace

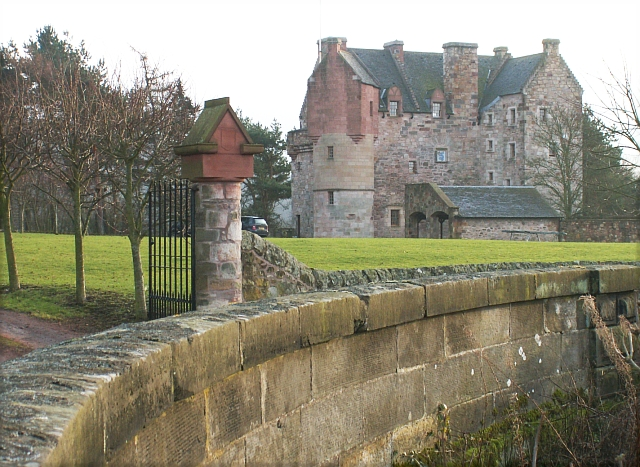
Dairsie Castle

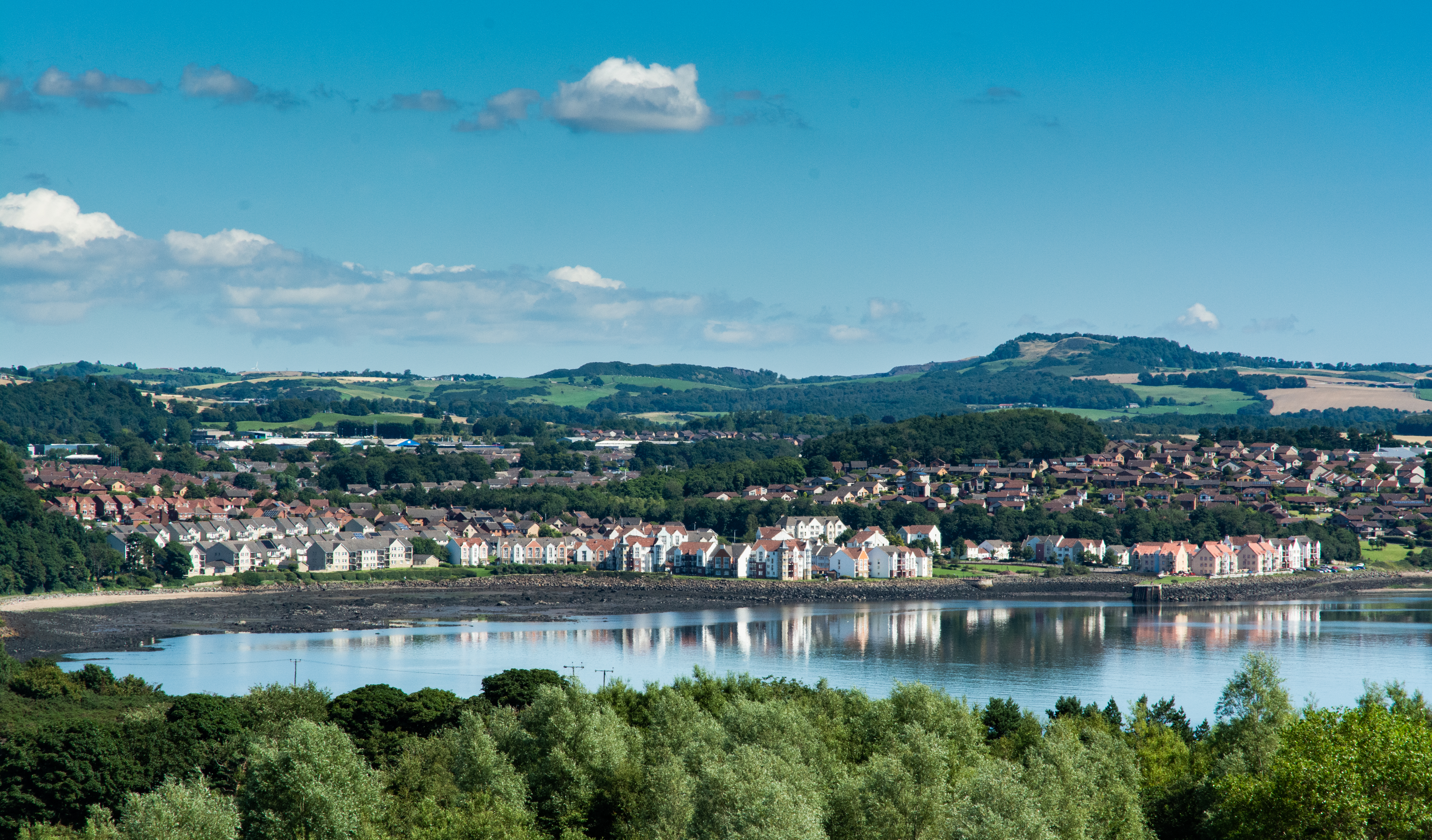
Dalgety Bay

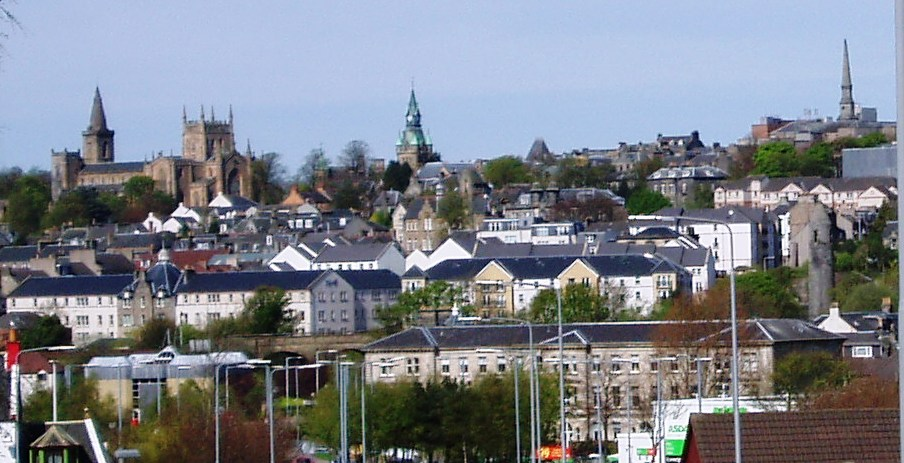
Dunfermline

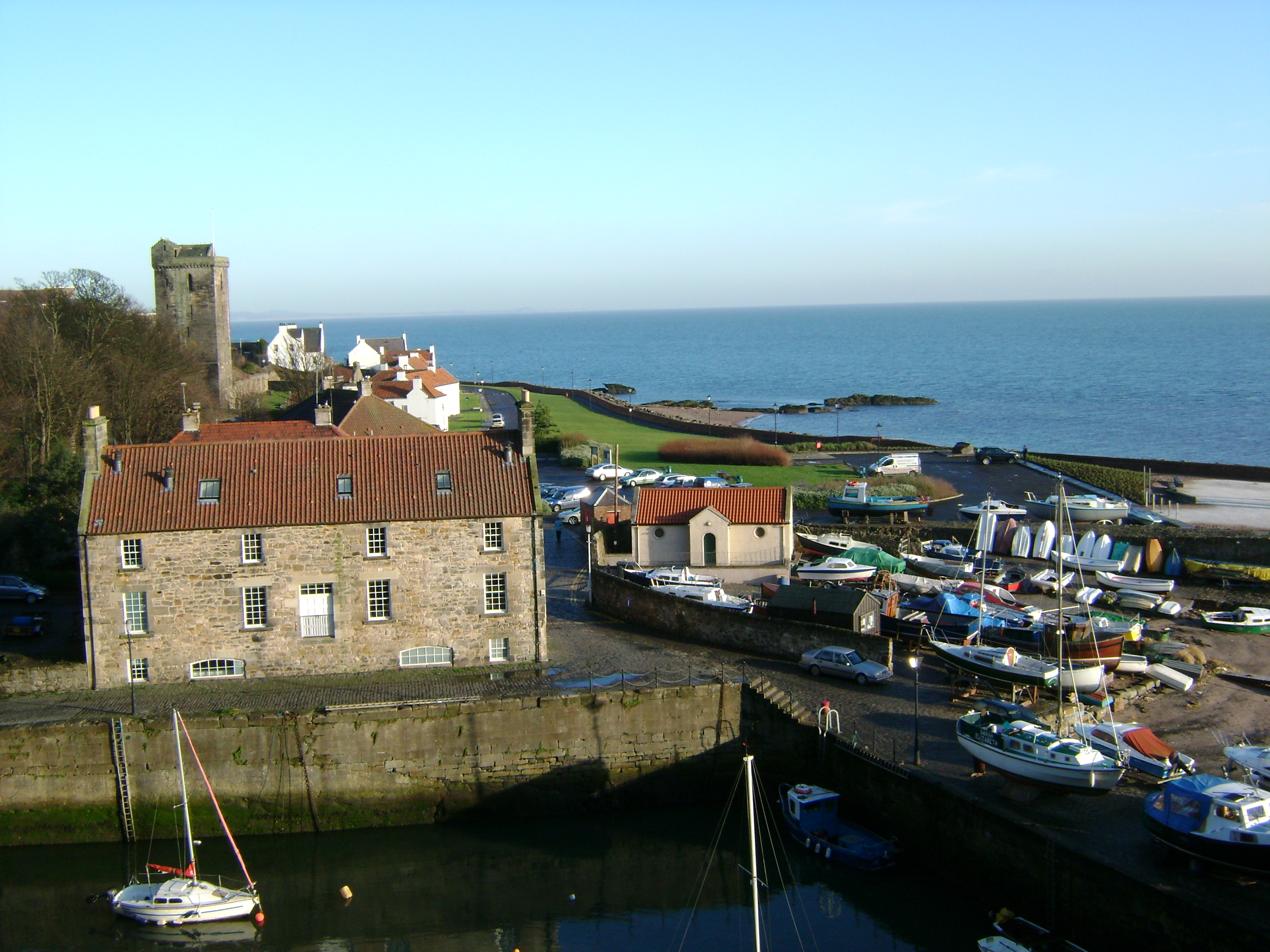
Dysart

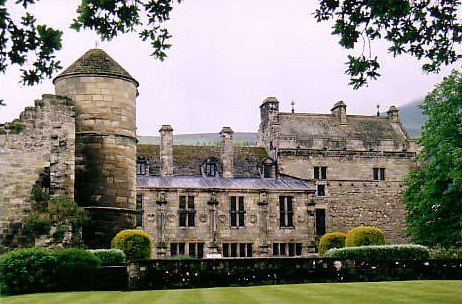
Falkland Palace

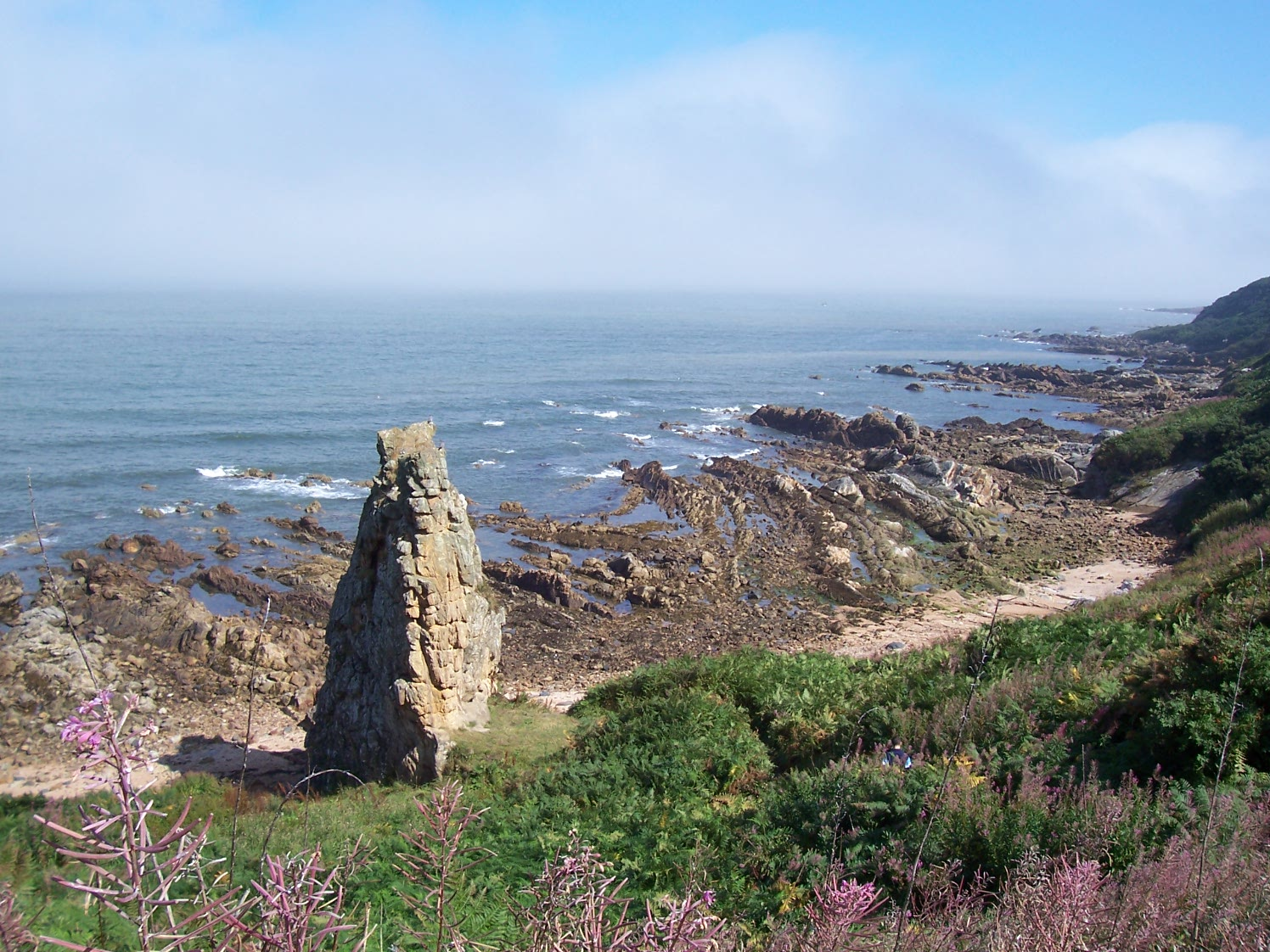
Fife Coastal path

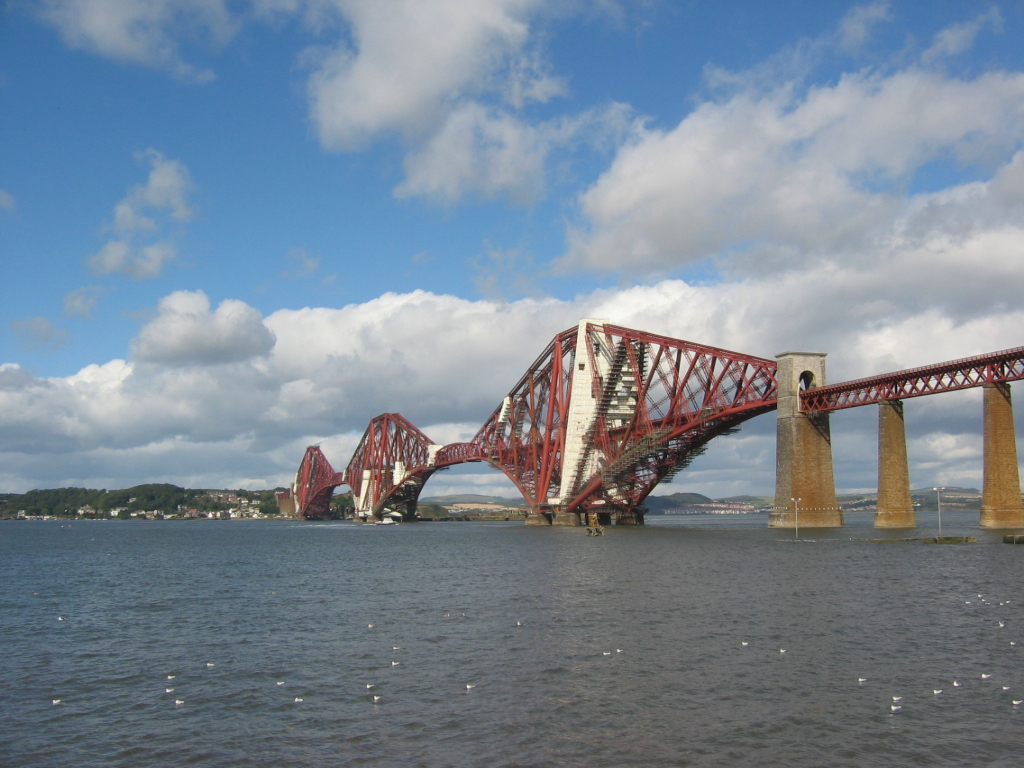
Forth Bridge

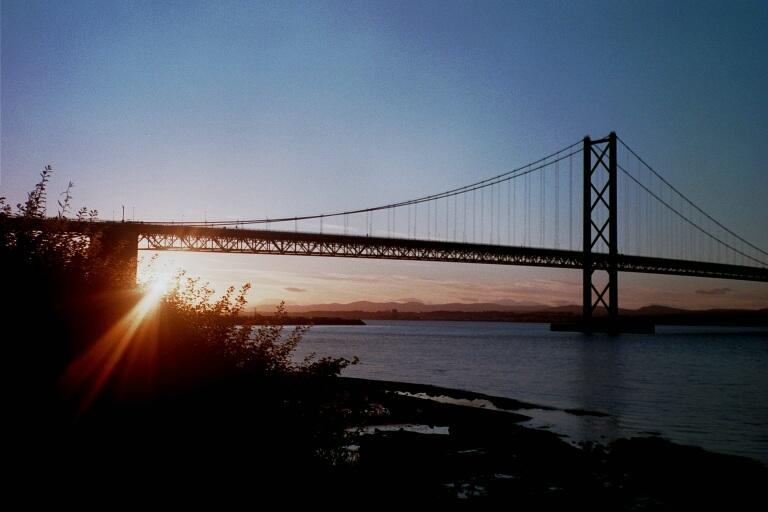
Forth Road Bridge

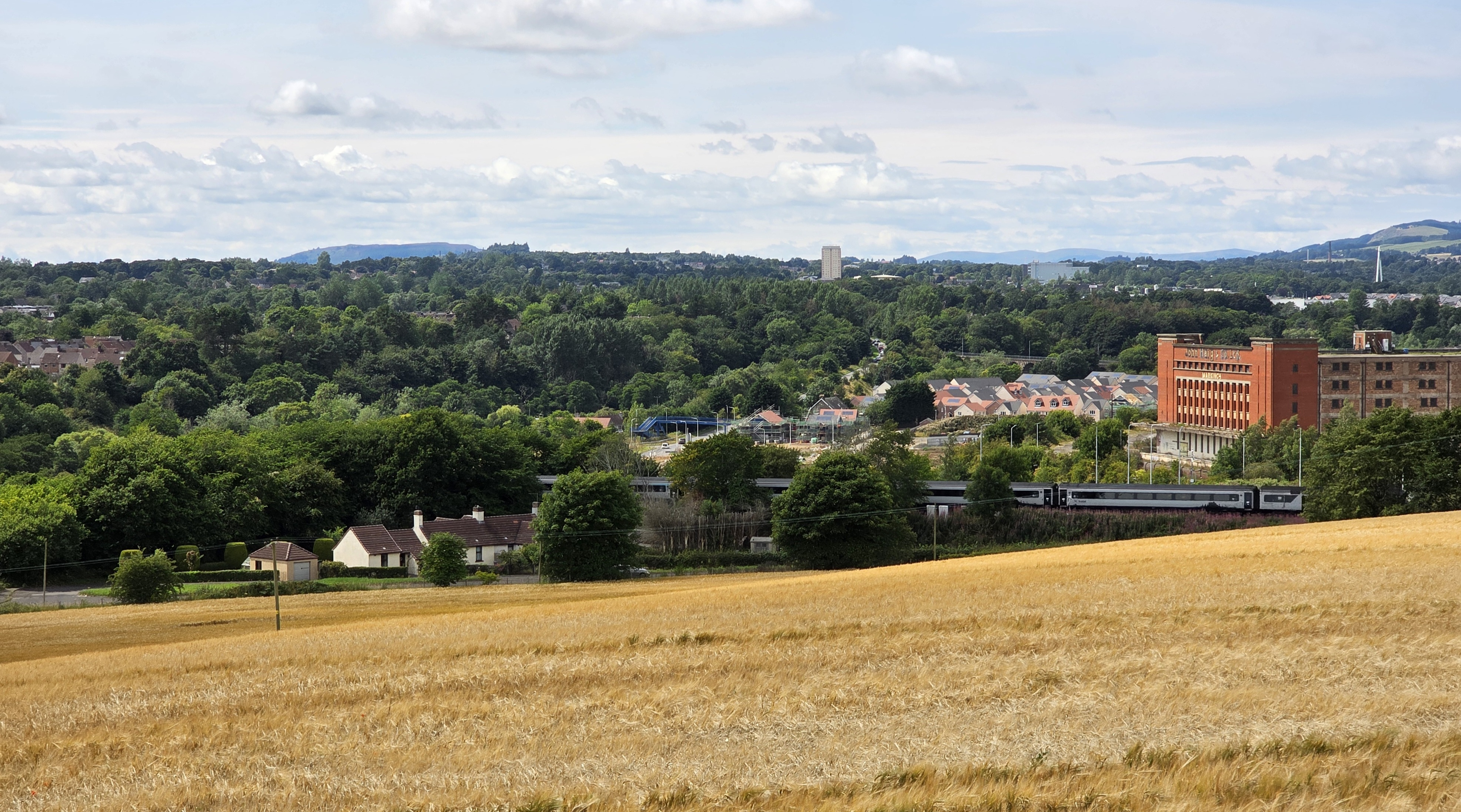
Glenrothes

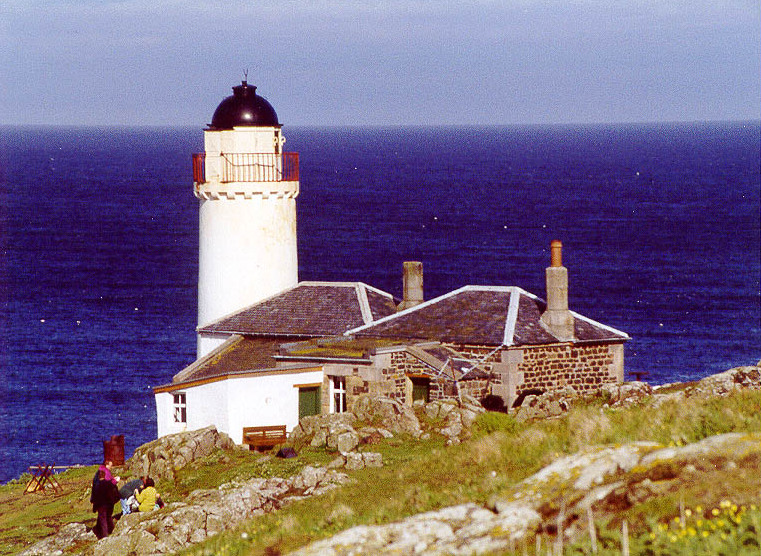
Isle of May

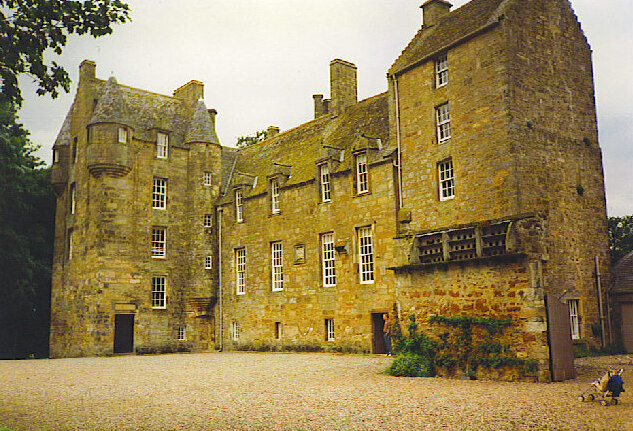
Kellie Castle

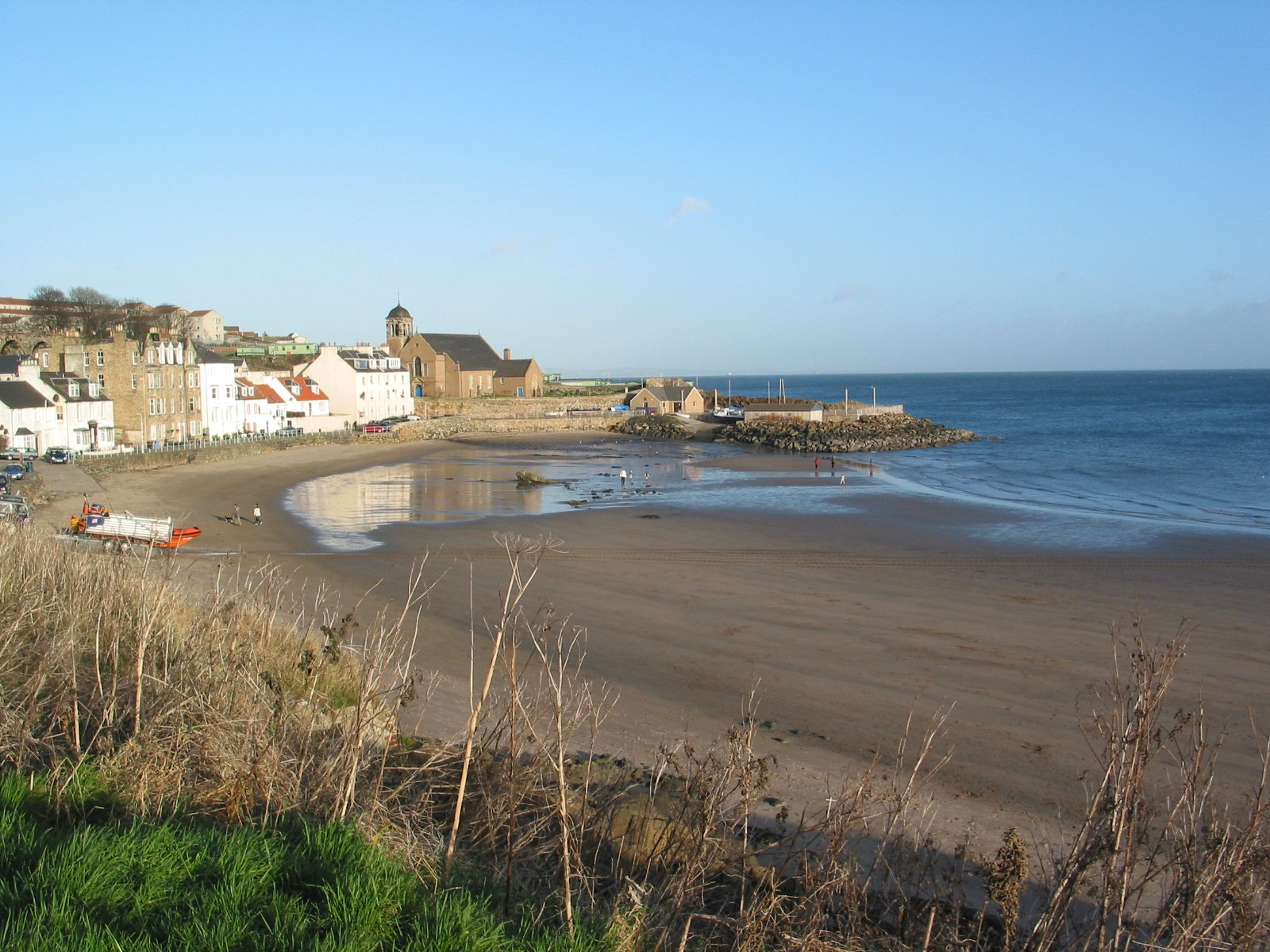
Kinghorn

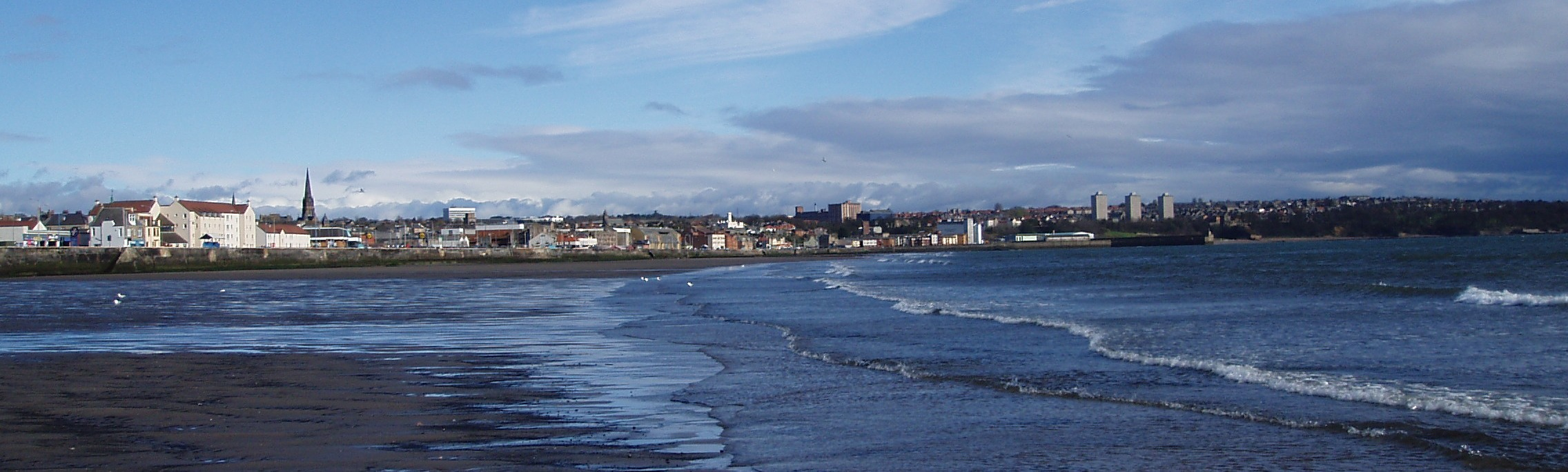
Kirkcaldy

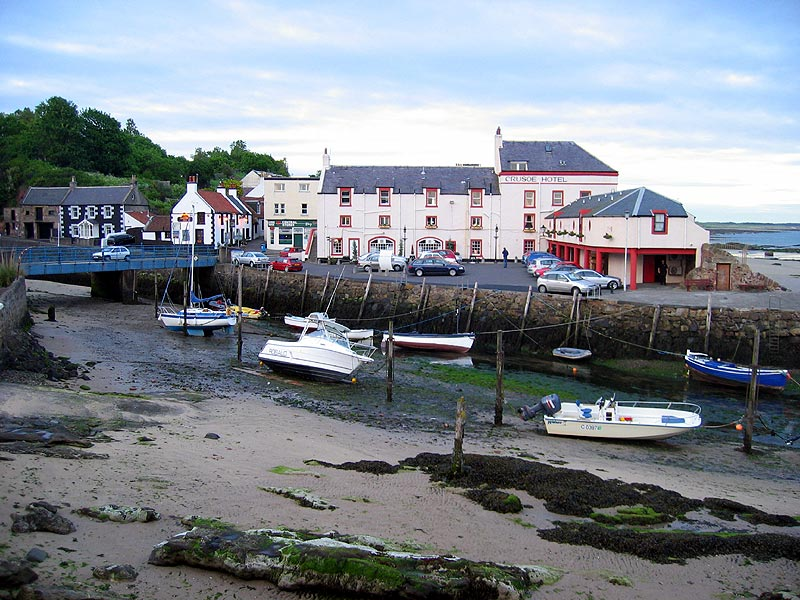
Lower Largo

Newark Castle

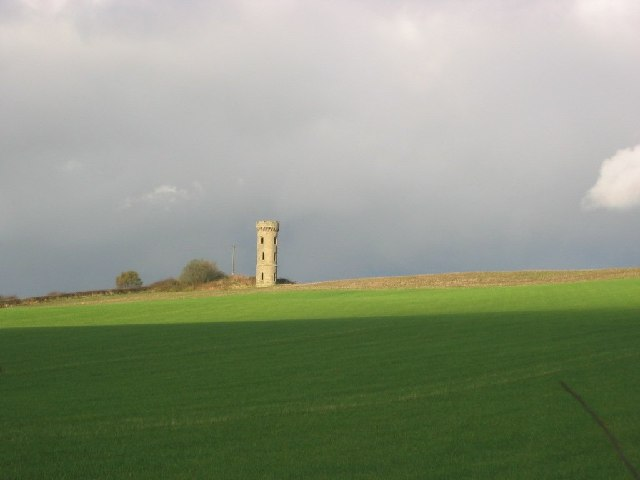
Oakley, Blair tower

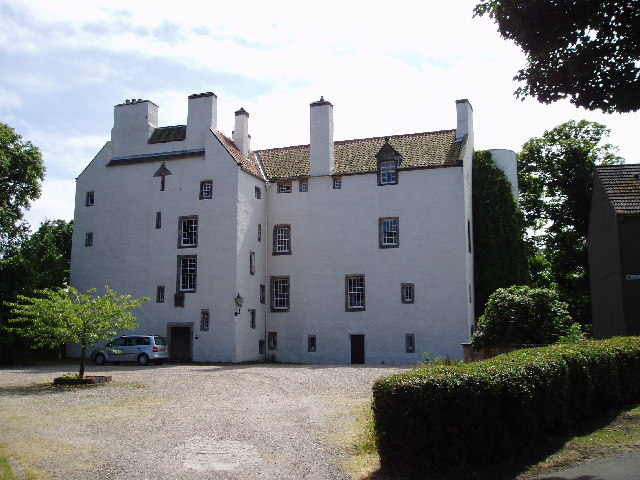
Rossend Castle

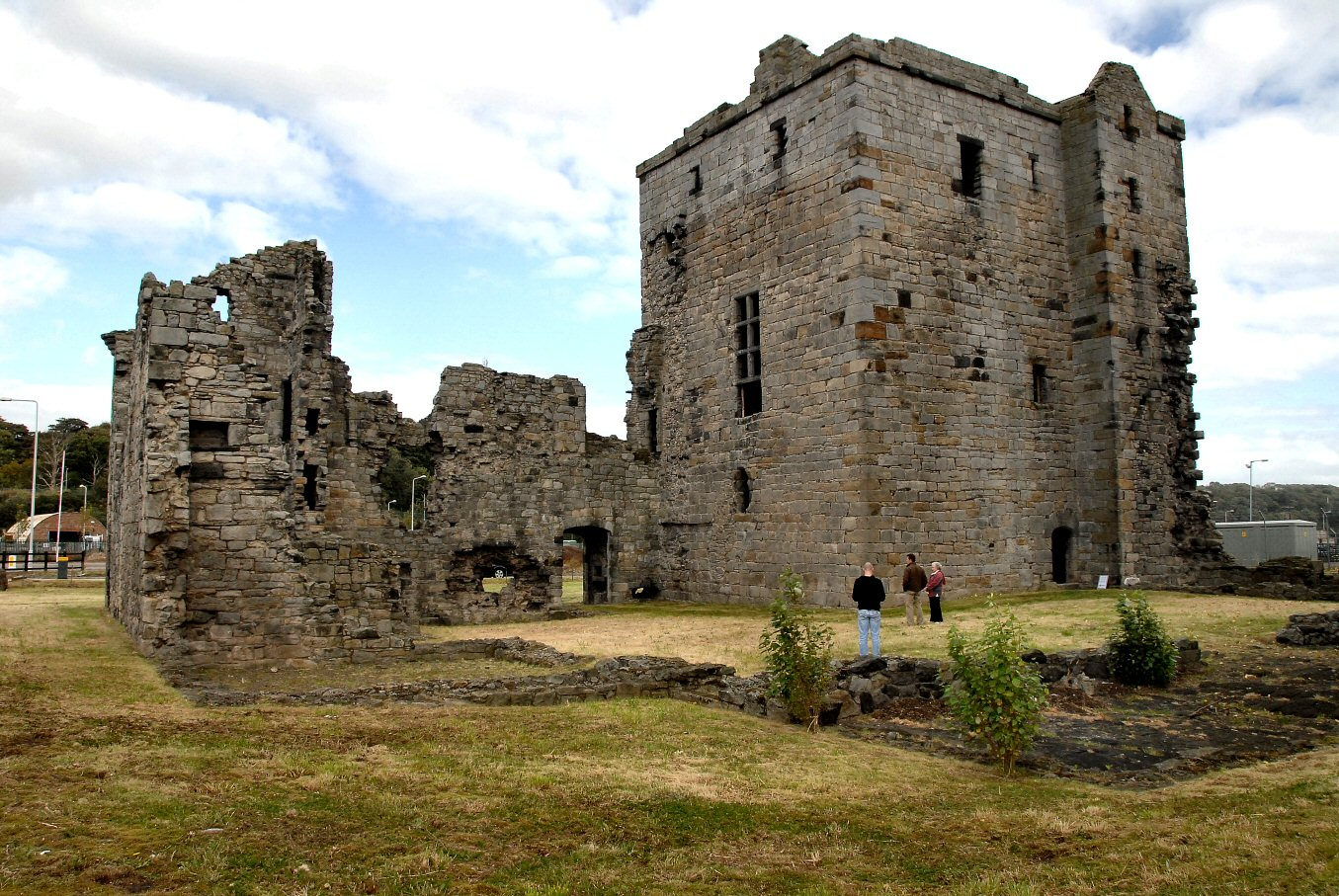
Rosyth Castle

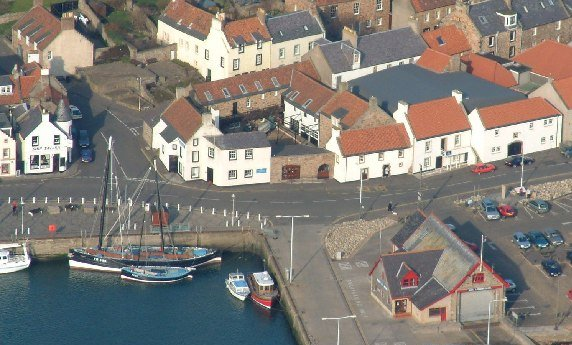
Scottish Fisheries Museum

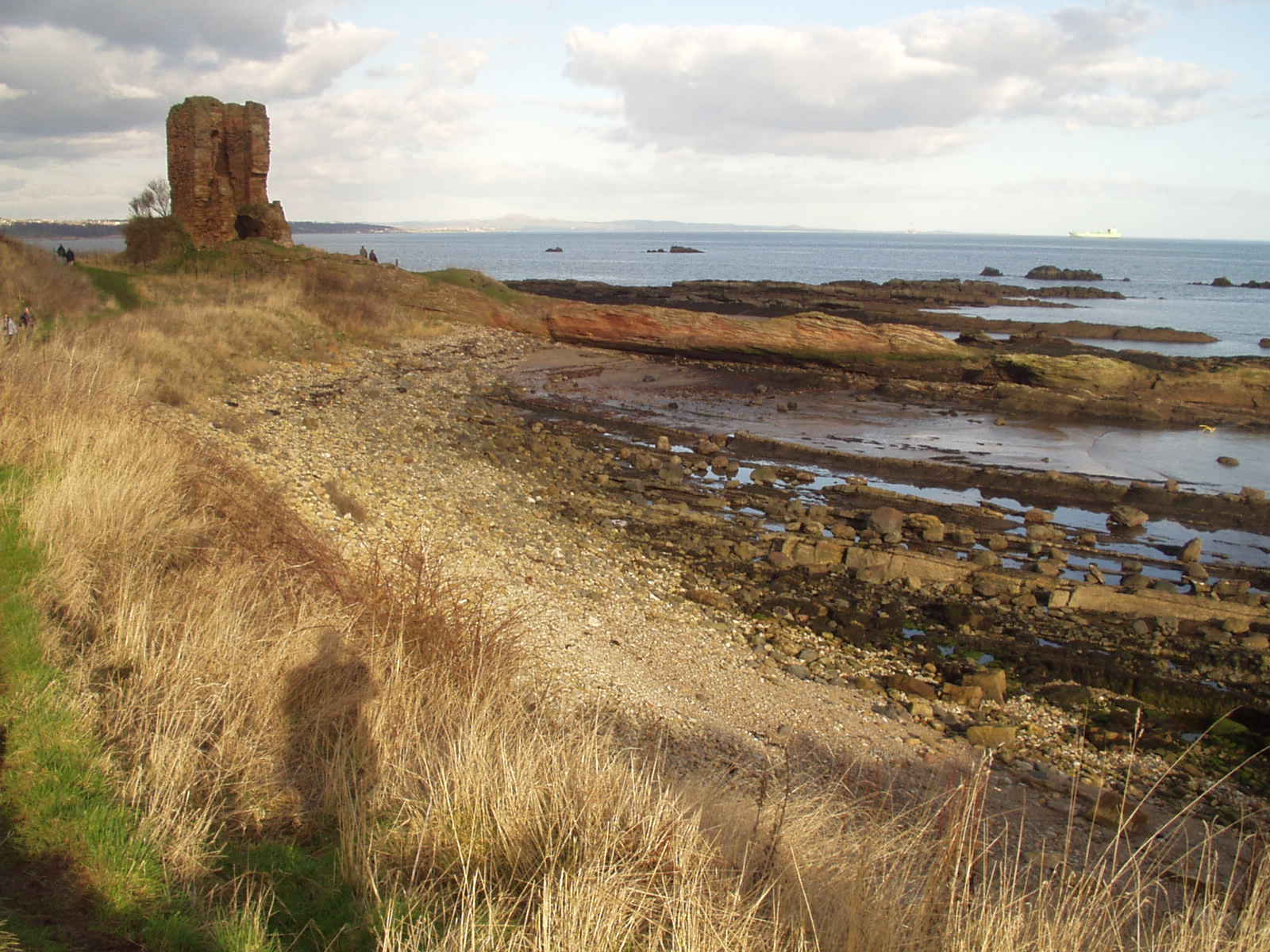
Seafield Tower

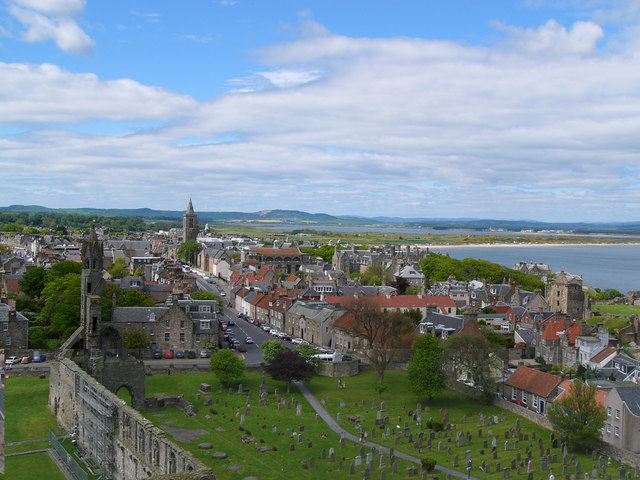
St Andrews

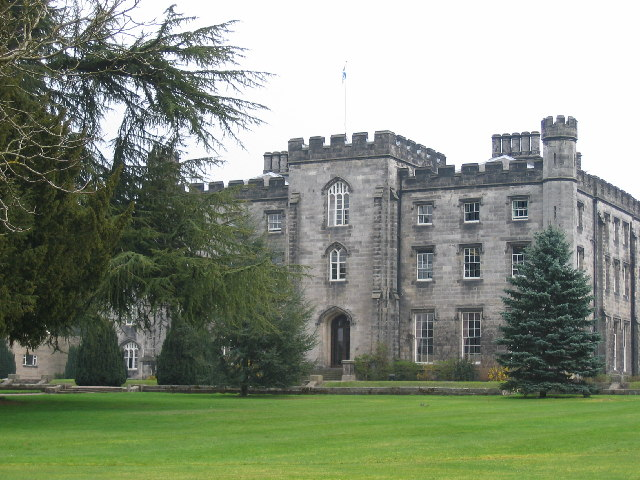
Tulliallan Castle

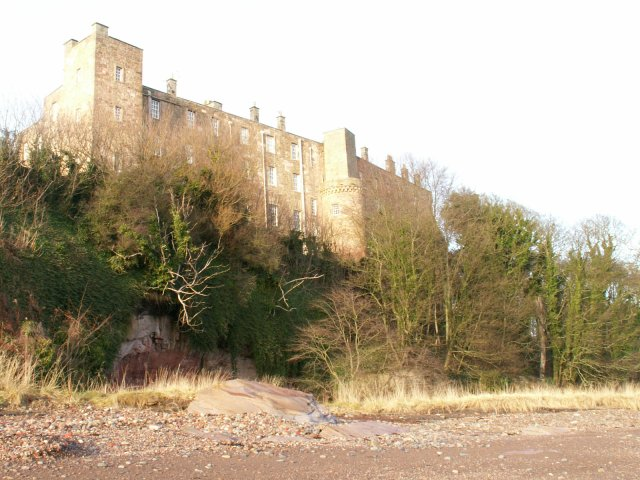
Wemyss Castle

== A ==
- Abercrombie
- Aberdour, Aberdour Castle, Aberdour railway station
- Anstruther, Anstruther Fish Bar
- Arncroach
- Auchmuirbridge
- Auchterderran
- Auchtermuchty
- Auchtertool

== B ==
- Balbirnie House, Balbirnie Park, Balbirnie Stone Circle
- Balcomie Castle
- Baldinnie
- Balfarg, Balfarg Henge
- Balgeddie House
- Balgonie Castle
- Ballingry
- Balmacolm
- Balmerino, Balmerino Abbey
- Balmullo
- Bayview Stadium
- Benarty
- Blairhall
- Blebo Craigs
- Bow of Fife
- Bowershall
- Brownhills
- Buckhaven
- Burntisland, Burntisland railway station

== C ==
- Cairneyhill
- Caves of Caiplie
- Camdean
- Cameron Reservoir
- Carden Tower
- Cardenden, Cardenden railway station
- Carnbee
- Carnock
- Cellardyke
- Central Park
- Ceres
- Charlestown
- Clackmannanshire Bridge
- Coaltown of Wemyss
- Collessie
- Comrie
- Cowdenbeath
- Craigkelly transmitting station
- Craigluscar Hill
- Craigrothie
- Craigtoun Country Park
- Crail, Crail Golfing Society
- Crombie
- Crossford
- Crossgates
- Crosshill
- Culross, Culross Palace
- Cult Hill
- Cupar, Cupar railway station
- Cupar Muir

== D ==
- Dairsie
- Dalgety Bay
- Dogton Stone
- Dollytown
- Donibristle
- Dunearn Hill
- Dunfermline, Dunfermline Abbey, Dunfermline Palace, Dunfermline Queen Margaret railway station, Dunfermline City railway station
- Dunshalt
- Dysart

== E ==
- Earlsferry
- East End Park
- East Neuk
- East Wemyss
- Eden Estuary
- Elie

== F ==
- Falkland, Falkland Palace, Falkland Palace Royal Tennis Club
- Fife Airport, Fife Circle Line, Fife Coastal Path, Fife Folk Museum Fife Ness
- Firth of Forth
- Fordell
- Forgan
- Forth Bridge, Forth Road Bridge
- Freuchie

== G ==
- Gateside
- Gauldry
- Glenrothes, Glenrothes with Thornton railway station
- Gowkhall
- Grange of Lindores
- Guardbridge

== H ==
- Halbeath
- High Valleyfield
- Hillend
- Hill of Beath
- Howe of Fife

== I ==
- Innerleven
- Inverkeithing, Battle of Inverkeithing, Inverkeithing railway station
- Isle of May

== J ==
- Jamestown

== K ==
- Kellie Castle
- Kelty
- Kemback
- Kennoway
- Kettlebridge
- Kilconquhar, Kilconquhar Loch
- Kilmany
- Kilrenny
- Kincaple
- Kincardine/Kincardine-on-Forth, Kincardine Bridge, Kincardine power station
- Kinghorn, Kinghorn railway station
- Kinglassie
- Kingsbarns
- Kingseat
- Kingskettle
- Kirkcaldy, Kirkcaldy Museum and Art Gallery, Kirkcaldy railway station
- Knockdavie Castle
- Knockhill

== L ==
- Ladybank
- Largo Bay, Largoward
- Leslie, Leslie House
- Letham
- Leuchars, Leuchars railway station, RAF Leuchars
- Leven
- Levenmouth
- Limekilns
- Lindores, Lindores Abbey
- Lochgelly
- Lochore, Lochore Meadows Country Park
- Lomond Hills, Lomond Hills Regional Park
- Longannet coal mine, Longannet Power Station
- Losody
- Low Valleyfield
- Lower Largo
- Lower Methil
- Lumphinnans
- Lundin Links
- Luthrie

== M ==
- Macduff's Castle
- Markinch, Markinch railway station
- Methil, Methilhill
- Milton of Balgonie
- Morton Lochs
- Mountfleurie
- Mugdrum Island
- Muirhead
- Myres Castle

== N ==
- Newark Castle
- Newburgh, Newburgh railway station
- Newburn
- Newmills
- Newport-on-Tay
- Newton of Falkland
- Norman's Law
- North Queensferry, North Queensferry railway station

== O ==
- Oakley
- Ochil Hills

== P ==
- Pathhead
- Pitcairn House
- Pitlessie
- Pitlour Hill
- Pitmilly
- Pitreavie Castle, Battle of Pitreavie
- Pitscottie
- Pittencrieff
- Pittenweem, Pittenweem Priory

== R ==
- Ravenscraig Castle
- River Eden
- Rockwood
- Rossend Castle
- Rosyth, Rosyth Castle, Rosyth Dockyard

== S ==
- Saline
- Scotstarvit Tower
- Scottish Fisheries Museum
- Seafield Tower
- Silversands Bay
- Springfield, Springfield railway station
- St Andrews, Old Course at St Andrews, St Andrews Botanic Garden, University of St Andrews
- St David's
- St Monans
- Star
- Stark's Park
- Steelend
- Stratheden
- Strathkinness
- Strathmiglo
- Strathtyrum

== T ==
- Tay Rail Bridge, Tay Road Bridge
- Tayport
- Tentsmuir Forest and Tentsmuir National Nature Reserve
- Thornton
- Torry Bay
- Torryburn
- Townhill Country Park
- Tulliallan, Tulliallan Castle

== U ==
- Upper Largo

== W ==
- Wellwood
- Wemyss Castle
- West Wemyss
- Windygates
- Woodhaven
- Wormit

== See also ==
- List of places in Scotland
