= List of listed buildings in Leuchars, Fife =

This is a list of listed buildings in the parish of Leuchars in Fife, Scotland.

== List ==
Name	Location	Date listed	Grid ref. (Note: Sometimes known as OSGB36, the grid reference (where provided) is based on the British national grid reference system used by the Ordnance Survey. • "Guide to National Grid". Ordnance Survey. • "Get-a-map". Ordnance Survey.)	Geo-coordinates	Notes	LB number (Note: Historic Environment Scotland assign a unique alphanumeric identifier to each designated site in Scotland, for listed buildings this always begins with "LB", for example "LB12345".)	Image
Parish Kirkyard				56°22′53″N 2°53′00″W	Category B	8843	Upload Photo
2 Main Street 'Rachel's Inn'				56°22′53″N 2°52′56″W	Category C(S)	8847	Upload Photo
Schoolbrae				56°22′54″N 2°53′08″W	Category C(S)	8849	Upload Photo
Mileplate At Balmullo Farm				56°22′30″N 2°55′41″W	Category B	8855	Upload Photo
Clayton House (Now Flatted)				56°21′14″N 2°55′23″W	Category C(S)	8859	Upload Photo
Kinshaldy House, Farmsteading And Walled Garden				56°24′06″N 2°49′52″W	Category B	8865	Upload Photo
Strathburn Farmhouse				56°24′00″N 2°55′31″W	Category B	8896	Upload Photo
Mileplate At Pickletillem				56°24′38″N 2°54′52″W	Category B	8897	Upload Photo
Guardbridge, Seggie House Including Gate Lodge And Walled Garden				56°21′36″N 2°54′02″W	Category C(S)	50494	Upload Photo
Guardbridge, Paper Mill (Former), Boiler House (Mill Building 49) And Stalk				56°21′56″N 2°53′24″W	Category B	51397	Upload Photo
Raf Leuchars, Domestic Side, Officers' Mess, Building Nos 10, 11, 65 And 175				56°22′38″N 2°53′08″W	Category C(S)	51420	Upload Photo
Raf Leuchars, Domestic Side, Former Barracks Blocks, Buildings 25, 26 And 27				56°22′42″N 2°53′01″W	Category B	51418	Upload Photo
Mileplate 300 Yards North Of Muirhead				56°21′44″N 2°56′22″W	Category B	13699	Upload Photo
Earlshall Walled Garden				56°22′44″N 2°52′04″W	Category B	8805	Upload another image
Parish Kirk Manse				56°22′55″N 2°52′55″W	Category B	8844	Upload Photo
3, 5, 7 Pitlethie Road ('Briar Cottage', 'The Anchorage' And 'Rose Cottage')				56°22′59″N 2°53′00″W	Category C(S)	8845	Upload Photo
7 Main Street 'Wayside'				56°22′53″N 2°52′58″W	Category C(S)	8848	Upload Photo
Doocot, Leuchars Castle				56°23′11″N 2°53′20″W	Category A	8851	Upload another image See more images
Earlshall				56°22′44″N 2°52′06″W	Category A	8852	Upload another image
Guardbridge (Old) Over River Eden				56°21′33″N 2°53′19″W	Category A	8861	Upload another image
Raf Leuchars, Domestic Side, Barracks Blocks, Buildings 1, 2, 3 And 5				56°22′42″N 2°52′57″W	Category C(S)	51417	Upload Photo
Vicarsford Cemetery, Lodge, Boundary Walls, Gates, Gatepiers And Railings				56°25′16″N 2°54′47″W	Category B	13476	Upload Photo
Balmullo Farmhouse And Gatepiers				56°22′29″N 2°55′45″W	Category B	8893	Upload Photo
Earlshall, Sundial To West Of House				56°22′44″N 2°52′07″W	Category C(S)	13014	Upload Photo
The Cottage (Now Willowbank) Guardbridge				56°21′35″N 2°53′31″W	Category B	8860	Upload Photo
Vicarsford Cemetery Chapel				56°25′13″N 2°54′41″W	Category A	8863	Upload another image
Guideplates At Junction Of A92 And Wormit Road 700 Yards North Of St Michael's				56°23′56″N 2°54′40″W	Category B	8898	Upload Photo
Guardbridge, Paper Mill (Former), Main Street Buildings Numbers 1, 2, 3, 3A, 4, 6, 7, 8, 17 And 26				56°21′54″N 2°53′32″W	Category B	51396	Upload Photo
Raf Leuchars, Domestic Side, Former Squash Court, Building No 70				56°22′41″N 2°53′03″W	Category C(S)	51419	Upload Photo
Raf Leuchars, Technical Side, Former Operations Block, Building 181				56°22′43″N 2°52′48″W	Category C(S)	51422	Upload Photo
Craigie House				56°24′25″N 2°53′13″W	Category B	8808	Upload Photo
Parish Kirk Of St Athernase				56°22′54″N 2°53′00″W	Category A	8842	Upload another image
Mileplates At Junction Of A91 And A92 North-East Of Dairsie Village				56°20′53″N 2°56′33″W	Category B	8856	Upload Photo
Raf Leuchars, Domestic Side, Old Sergeants' Mess, Building 8				56°22′45″N 2°52′55″W	Category C(S)	51421	Upload Photo
Leuchars War Memorial				56°23′05″N 2°53′56″W	Category C(S)	10798	Upload another image
86 Main Street, 'st Annes'				56°23′02″N 2°53′21″W	Category B	8850	Upload Photo
Pitcullo Castle				56°21′44″N 2°57′03″W	Category A	8857	Upload another image
Raf Leuchars, Technical Side, General Service Aircraft Sheds, Buildings 55 And 57				56°22′35″N 2°52′33″W	Category A	51423	Upload Photo
Craigsanquhar House				56°21′40″N 2°58′50″W	Category B	43925	Upload Photo
Craigsanquhar House, Steading				56°21′41″N 2°58′53″W	Category C(S)	43926	Upload Photo
Leuchars Lodge, Hermitage Lodge				56°23′43″N 2°54′18″W	Category C(S)	13723	Upload Photo
Earlshall, Sundial On East Side Of Terraced Garden				56°22′44″N 2°52′02″W	Category B	13015	Upload Photo
Pitlethie House				56°23′11″N 2°52′42″W	Category B	8807	Upload Photo
Mileplate Near Southfield				56°23′11″N 2°54′57″W	Category B	8854	Upload Photo
Clayton Den Ice House Above Moonzie Burn				56°21′28″N 2°55′51″W	Category C(S)	8864	Upload Photo
59 And 61 Main Street, Ye Olde Hotel Including Gig House With Hayloft And Boundary Wall				56°22′57″N 2°53′15″W	Category B	49915	Upload Photo
Craigsanquhar House, Walled Garden				56°21′43″N 2°58′47″W	Category B	43927	Upload Photo
Earlshall Lodge				56°22′46″N 2°52′08″W	Category B	8806	Upload Photo
9 Pitlethie Road 'seaview'				56°22′56″N 2°52′59″W	Category C(S)	8846	Upload Photo
Earlshall Doocot				56°22′42″N 2°52′07″W	Category A	8853	Upload another image
Pitcullo Doocot				56°21′39″N 2°57′00″W	Category B	8858	Upload another image
Inner Bridge (Old) Over Motray Water, Guardbridge				56°22′01″N 2°53′31″W	Category B	8862	Upload another image
Hayston Farmhouse				56°22′08″N 2°56′26″W	Category B	8895	Upload Photo
Mileplate Approx 500 Yards North Of St Michael's				56°23′51″N 2°54′34″W	Category B	8899	Upload Photo
Raf Leuchars, Technical Side, Watch Office, Building 213				56°22′31″N 2°52′49″W	Category C(S)	51424	Upload Photo

== Key ==
The scheme for classifying buildings in Scotland is:

- Category A: "buildings of national or international importance, either architectural or historic; or fine, little-altered examples of some particular period, style or building type."
- Category B: "buildings of regional or more than local importance; or major examples of some particular period, style or building type, which may have been altered."
- Category C: "buildings of local importance; lesser examples of any period, style, or building type, as originally constructed or moderately altered; and simple traditional buildings which group well with other listed buildings."

In March 2016 there were 47,288 listed buildings in Scotland. Of these, 8% were Category A, and 50% were Category B, with the remaining 42% being Category C.

== See also ==
- List of listed buildings in Fife
