= George Gilroy =

George Gilroy may refer to:

- George Gilroy (cricketer) (1889–1916), Scottish cricketer and British Army officer
- George Gilroy (RAF officer) (1914–1995), British flying ace
