= Blebo Craigs =

Coordinates: 56.3259°N 2.9237°W

- Location within Fife
- Population: 50
- OS grid reference: NO430152
- Council area: Fife
- Lieutenancy area: Fife
- Country: Scotland
- Sovereign state: United Kingdom
- Post town: CUPAR
- Postcode district: KY15
- Dialling code: 01334
- Police: Scotland
- Fire: Scottish
- Ambulance: Scottish
- UK Parliament: North East Fife
- Scottish Parliament: North East Fife

Blebo Craigs, or Blebocraigs is a village in rural Fife, Scotland. The village contains around one hundred houses on the south-facing slope of the hill. Blebo Craigs is 5 miles from St Andrews.

== Geography ==
Most of the village lies on a sunny south facing slope. It borders a wood which is open to the public for walking and other leisure activities. The area of forest is the site of old quarries. The forest covers a steep slope that falls away to the cliffs of Dura Den. The village hall lies at the heart of village social life. At the door of the village hall one can find a map showing the layout of the settlement. A book describing life in the village over the last hundred years is available via the village hall secretary.

== History ==
"Craig" is a Scots word meaning rocky promontory. Two large quarries (one for sandstone - still visible, one for roof slate can be found in the woods. Its sandstone was used to build many of the area's buildings. The quarry's galleries slowly shrank under the weight of 8 metres of overhanging rock.

Most of the village plan is based on two industrial developments. The straight road east of the postbox was built along the north border of Blebo House estate lands, over Clatto Hill, then (almost) straight to Strathkinness to take the products of the Blebo Mills to Guardbridge, Dundee and St Andrews, bypassing the toll fees at Dairsie, and on the main Cupar to St Andrews roads. As the sandstone and slate quarry operations expanded into a year-round activity, (rather than transient and seasonal as they had been since Medieval times) houses and schools were built along the road after the 1830s.

The architectural, and other land use history, of the village is dominated by the houses of the estates of Clatto, Blebo and Kemback, each with their own histories going back hundreds of years. All three have fine buildings. Three notable owners were the Lairds of Kemback;- an important Roman Catholic family after the Reformation, D.C Thompson of D. C. Thomson & Co. Ltd publishers of newspapers, and children's weekly comics such as The Beano, and William Low, owner of the food retailer of the same name.

== Connections with Dundee ==
Flax mill workers in Dura Den and Kemback originally from Dundee forged connections with families still in the Angus town. The Boys' Brigade, 17th Company (1919 onward), then 5th Company (from the mid-1930s onward) held camps in the small wood and fields at the east end of the village until the mid-1980s. It was felt that the country air was a break from the polluted coal-dust atmosphere in the streets and congested air inside the jute mills in Dundee at the time. Weekend and summer camps were offered, with the support of the village and local farmers. A large collection of camping photographs are held by 5th Company, Dundee, and a film from 1953 is held in the Scottish National Film Archive. The village telephone box was used by the boys to earn their merit badges, making their first personal call to an officer, or officer's wife in Dundee, then answering a call correctly.

== Economy ==
Blebo Craigs has little economic activity. A locally run post office was located in the village hall until January 2026. Historically the village had a public house, but this was converted into a house.
