= Fife House, Glenrothes =

Council Offices in Glenrothes, Scotland

Fife House
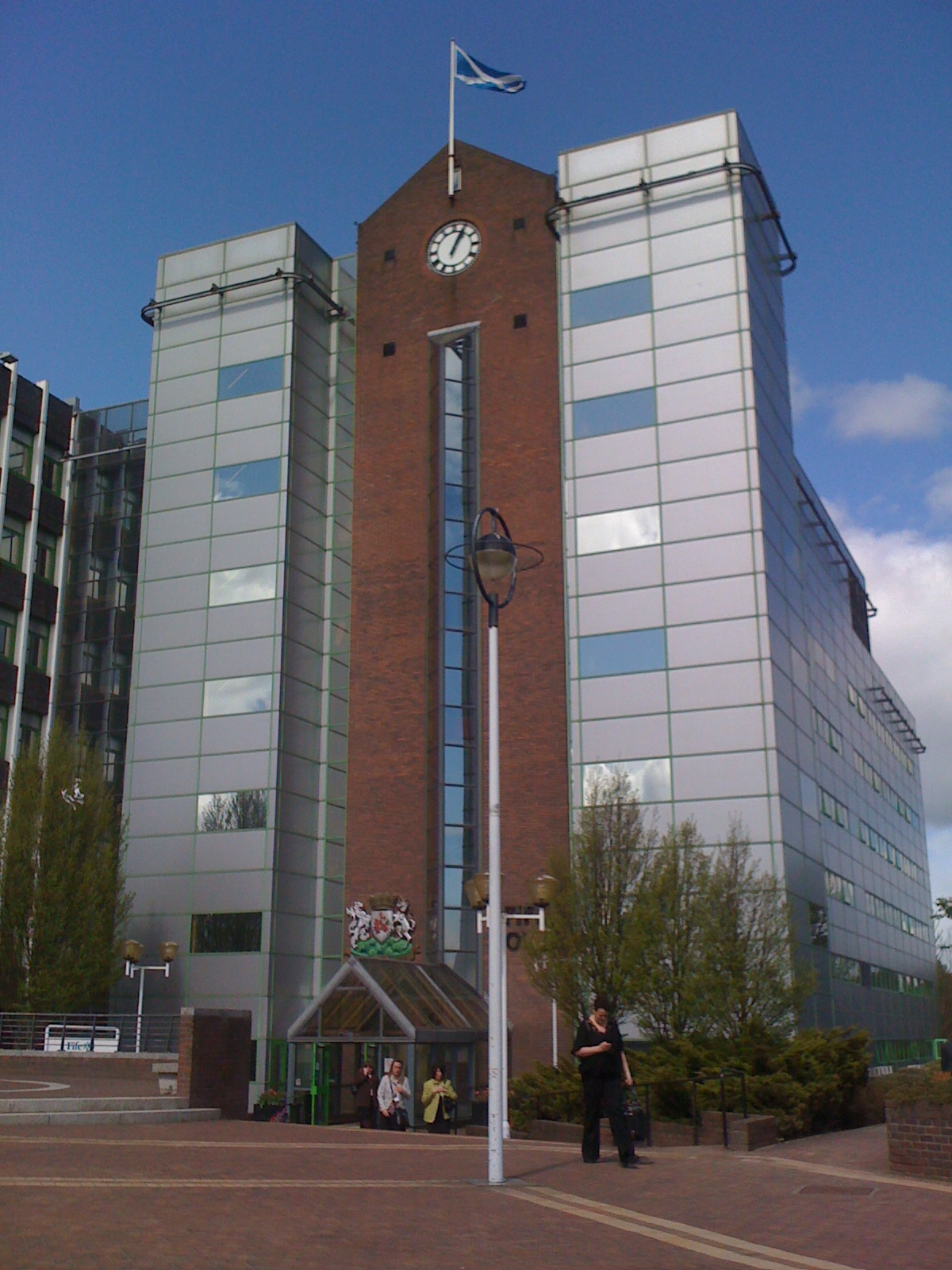
- The entrance to Fife House

- Location within Fife

General information
- Architectural style: Modern style
- Location: North Street, Glenrothes, Scotland
- Coordinates: 56.1976°N 3.1758°W
- Completed: 1969

Design and construction
- Architect: Merlyn Christopher Williams

Fife House, formerly Glenrothes House, is a large office development on North Street in Glenrothes, Fife, Scotland. It was built for Glenrothes Development Corporation in 1969, then became the headquarters of Fife Regional Council from shortly after its formation in 1975 and then became the offices and meeting place of Fife Council in 1996.

== History ==
The site was previously farmland, with a large paper mill, known as Auchmuty Paper Mill, which had been developed by Tullis Russell and Company in the 19th century located to the northwest. Glenrothes Development Corporation, which was designated in 1948 under the New Towns Act 1946, acquired the farmlands around the paper mill from Tullis Russell and Company in 1951. The west wing of the building was commissioned by the corporation, in the mid-1960s, to be its main offices and to be known as "Glenrothes House".

The building was designed by the chief architect of Glenrothes Development Corporation, Merlyn Christopher Williams, in the Modern style, built in concrete and glass and was completed in 1969. It involved a main frontage of 22 bays facing onto North Street: the seven-storey building was faced with alternating bands of concrete and windows. The design employed pre-cast concrete units for use as load-bearing walls.

In 1975, Glenrothes Development Corporation relocated to new offices in Glenrothes. Local government reorganisation that year saw the old Fife County Council abolished and a new Fife Regional Council created. The regional council was briefly based at the county council's old headquarters at County Buildings in Cupar, but moved to Glenrothes House later in 1975, and renamed it "Fife House". A major extension, also designed by the corporation architectural staff, was erected to the east of the existing structure, to provide extra accommodation for the staff of the regional council, in 1980. The new block featured a tall pedimented clock tower clad in red brick flanked by towers clad by panels. A gabled glass portico projected forward from the structure.

Following the implementation of the Local Government etc. (Scotland) Act 1994, Fife Regional Council was abolished in 1996 and ownership of the building was transferred to the new unitary authority, Fife Council, which designated the building its main office.

Works of art in the building included an in situ concrete wall designed and sculpted by George Garson.
