= Gowkhall =

Coordinates: 56.084°N 3.522°W

Gowkhall: Scots: Gowkhauch
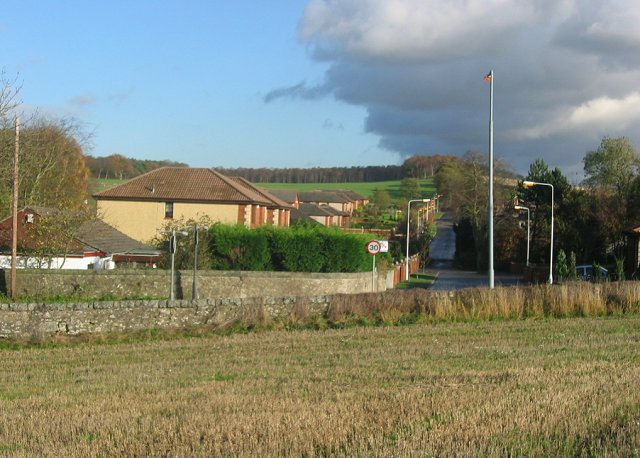

- Location within Fife
- Population: 220
- OS grid reference: NT053890
- Council area: Fife
- Country: Scotland
- Sovereign state: United Kingdom
- Police: Scotland
- Fire: Scottish
- Ambulance: Scottish
- UK Parliament: Dunfermline and West Fife
- Scottish Parliament: Dunfermline

Gowkhall (for a period known as Balclune) is a hamlet in Fife Scotland, 3.6 miles (5.794 km) west of Dunfermline. The nearest village of size is Carnock 0.8 miles (1.287 km) to the west, which has a church and primary school. To the south there is the Dean Woods past which is the village of Crossford, which has two hotels and businesses.

== Alternative names ==
Gowkhall seems to have had at least two names in the past. In the William Roy Military Survey maps of Scotland 1747-55 the village does not appear to be marked. However, in John Ainslie' mapping of Fife in 1775 it is, showing the large Clunie estate to immediate East of the village. In the later John Thomson's Atlas of Scotland 1832 it is clearly marked as Gowkhall, with the centre of the village being where the modern day junction between Clune Road and Dean Ridge occurs. However, by the Ordnance Survey map of 1898 the village is known as Balclune with no mention of Gowkhall, the name Gowkhall returns in the next (3rd) edition of the Ordnance Survey Maps 1903.

== Modern day ==
The hamlet of Gowkhall comes under the authority of the Carnock and Gowkhall Community Council making use of the primary school in Carnock. No public amenities exist in Gowkhall itself.

== History ==
Gowkhall historically is considered to have resided in the Lands of Clune, which in modern terms refers to the Wester Clune Farm. The Clune lands were originally in the barony of Pittencrieff and the parish of Dunfermline. The lands were latterly transferred into the parish of Carnock. References have been found back to 14 February 1441:

"Instrument of Sasine in favour of David Hakat of lands of Clwno, lying in the barony of Pettyncref and sheriffdom of Fife, conform to his charter."
('Pitfirrane Writs', 30)

The name Clune is repeatedly associated, through various tales, with a Clunic Monk, or Knight Templar who used to reside in the area. One reference refers to unspecified sources telling that the Knight was known to wear "black frock, a pelisse, a hood of lamb's wool, red hose, a white woollen tunic, and black scapular - the latter sometimes white, and at other times red.". The fables tell of this clunic being "hospitable to strangers, fed the hungry, clothed the naked, and gave drink to those who were athirst, and performed his duty.". Certainly the name Clunie has persisted with the area and continues to this day, the lands now consider to be Wester Clune Farm used to reside in the Clunie Estate, shown in maps of 1776.

Gowkhall officially broke with the Clune Estate on 22 October 1747 when Professor Erskine of Carnock acquired from James Henderson of Clune "the Room of land of the lands of Clune called Gowkhall" (G.R.S. 69)

Gowkhall is reputed to have been a very attractive village in the early days and a one time native of the village is known to have been John Millar who is known to have spent the majority of his life teaching in London at a "Ragged School". Some lines of poetry are associated with him.

Oh worthy folk o' auld Gowkha'
Though neither great, nor grand, nor braw
Yet kindly folk were ye
And mony a face, I mind it still
While fancy sits upon your hill
And looks wi' mem'ry's e'e.

John Millar (date unknown)

Gowkhall did at one time boast its own pub, called the Bamboo Inn currently known as Bamboo Cottage. This was closed down due to a "fatal incident" in the late 19th century resulting the licensee losing his license. The name Bamboo Inn is of unknown origin and a local bridge is also referred to as Bamboo Bridge. One source refers to the name "Bambow" in place of Bamboo, but no reference is provided to indicate if this was the original form. Gowkhall used to be famed for the number of wells that had been sunk in the village and in the early 19th century consisted mainly of hand weaving cottages. These cottages were demolished in the late 19th century and the stones used to build the impressive wall surrounding Luscar House, the Luskar Dyke.

A curling pond was also located in Gowkhall, on the western edge. Reports suggest the access steps up to the road through the dyke still exist.

The grounds of Luscar House built in 1838 by two of Scotland leading architects (David Bryce) of the time border the village. This house was in later years a residential care home. This category B listed building was largely destroyed by fire in 2001, following planning refusal to allow conversion into a hotel. In 2003 the house succumbed to demolition without planning consent. The stables being converted into modern living accommodation, legal proceedings followed resulting a controversially small fine (£300) being levied on the persons responsible.

== Transport ==
The village has two bus stops.

- Eastbound Traveline code : 34325427
- Westbound Traveline Code : 34325432

Services run from Dunfermline bus station serving Carnock, Oakley, Fife and Saline, Fife.
