= George Gilroy (cricketer) =

Scottish cricketer and British Army officer (1889–1916)

Personal information
- Full name: George Bruce Gilroy
- Born: 16 September 1889; Blebocraigs, Fife, Scotland
- Died: 15 July 1916 (aged 26); Longueval, Somme, France
- Batting: Right-handed
- Role: Wicket-keeper

Domestic team information
- Years: Team
- 1909: Oxford University

Career statistics
Competition	First-class
Matches	1
Runs scored	2
Batting average	–
100s/50s	–/–
Top score	2*
Catches/stumpings	–/–
- Source: Cricinfo, 15 January 2020

George Bruce Gilroy MC (16 September 1889 – 15 July 1916) was a Scottish first-class cricketer and British Army officer.

The son of George and Annie Gilroy, he was born at Clatto House in Blebocraigs, Fife. He was educated at Winchester College, before going up to Magdalen College, Oxford. While studying at Oxford, Gilroy made a single appearance in first-class cricket for Oxford University against the Marylebone Cricket Club at Lord's in 1909. After graduating from Oxford, he joined his father in his jute spinning and manufacturing business.

Gilroy served in the British Army during the First World War with the Black Watch, being commissioned as a temporary second lieutenant in August 1914, with promotion to temporary lieutenant in February 1915. He was made a temporary captain in October 1915, while commanding a company. He was awarded the Military Cross for actions at the Battle of Loos in September–October 1915. Gilroy was wounded in action at Longueval during the Battle of the Somme on 14 July 1916, dying from his wounds the following day.
