= Stratheden, Fife =

Coordinates: 56.30485°N 3.0548°W

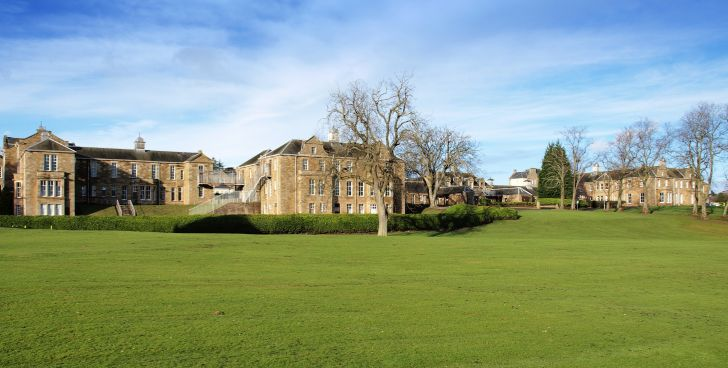
South side of Stratheden showing wards already closed

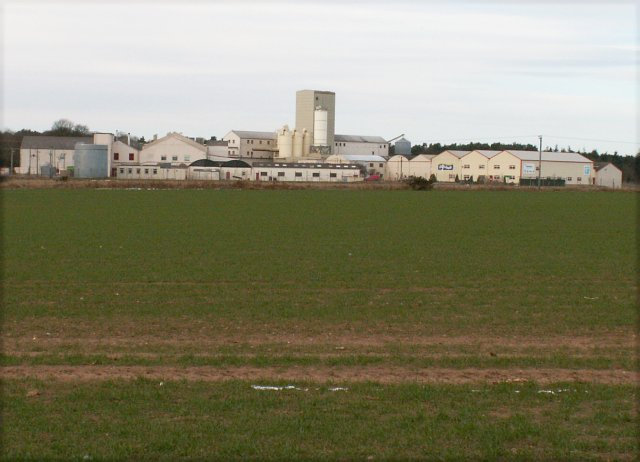
Porridge oats factory

Stratheden (Gaelic: Srath Aodainn) is a hamlet 2 miles west of Cupar, and just north of Springfield, in Fife, Scotland.

Stratheden Hospital was built as the Fife and Kinross District Lunatic Asylum in July 1866. It has also been known as Cupar Asylum and Springfield Asylum; it has been called Stratheden Hospital since January 1949, after the creation of the National Health Service. Stratheden Cottages were originally built as housing for the hospital staff.

The Scott's Porage Oats factory is located nearby, as is Elmwood Farm, the first fully organic farm in Scotland. The Scottish Deer Centre is located just to the west.

Stratheden is located within the Church of Scotland parish of Ceres, Kemback and Springfield.
