= Pickletillum =

Coordinates: 56.4109°N 2.9148°W

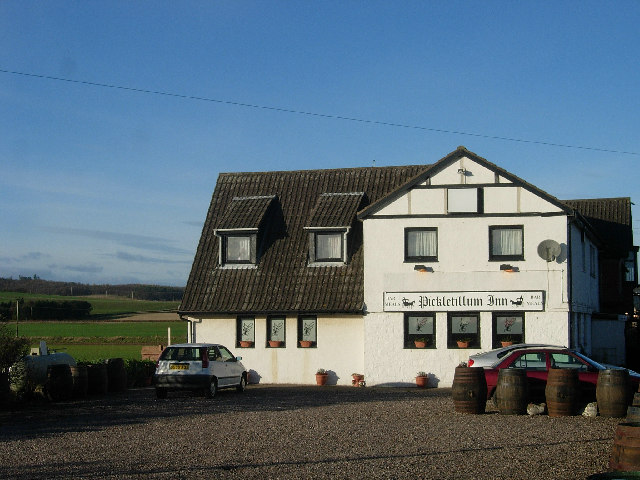
- Pickletillum Inn

- Location within Fife
- OS grid reference: NO436246
- Council area: Fife
- Lieutenancy area: Fife
- Country: Scotland
- Sovereign state: United Kingdom
- Post town: ST ANDREWS
- Postcode district: KY16
- Dialling code: 01334
- Police: Scotland
- Fire: Scottish
- Ambulance: Scottish
- UK Parliament: North East Fife
- Scottish Parliament: North East Fife

Pickletillem or Pickletillum is a hamlet situated in Fife, Scotland. It is 9 miles (14 km) from the town of St. Andrews and 5.9 miles (9.5 km) from the city of Dundee. The hamlet is a collection of only 12 households and is located on the west side of the A914, south of the junction with the A92.

== Overview and history ==
Pickletillum is a small hamlet which had an inn and has a few houses.

The Pickletillum Inn, a coaching inn dating from 1732, was demolished in 2018 after standing unoccupied and dilapidated for years. Planning permission was granted by Fife Council in 2015 for 8 2-bedroom flats to be built on the site by Kingdom Housing Association and these are due for occupation in January 2021.

== Governance ==
Fife Council is the unitary local authority for Pickletillum.

The village is in the North East Fife constituency of the Parliament of the United Kingdom.

For the purposes of the Scottish Parliament, Pickletillum forms part of the North East Fife constituency.
