= Springfield, Fife =

Town in Fife, Scotland

Coordinates: 56.2947°N 3.0617°W

Springfield
- Town
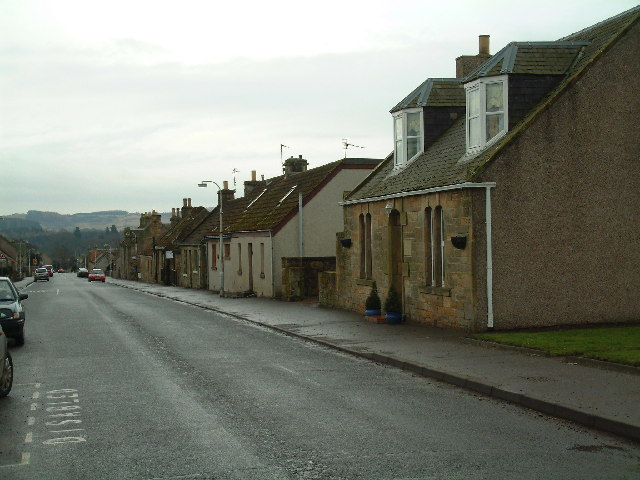

- Location within Fife
- Population: 1,100 (2020)
- OS grid reference: NO34151189
- Council area: Fife
- Lieutenancy area: Fife
- Country: Scotland
- Sovereign state: United Kingdom
- Post town: CUPAR
- Postcode district: KY15
- Police: Scotland
- Fire: Scottish
- Ambulance: Scottish
- UK Parliament: North East Fife
- Scottish Parliament: North East Fife

Springfield is a town on the edge of the Howe of Fife, 3 miles (4.8 km) to the south-west of the town of Cupar, Fife, Scotland.

The origin of the community is thought to be from the linen industry in the 19th century. The Church of Scotland parish church was built in 1861, and now shares a minister with nearby Ceres and Kemback. The church garden was originally intended to be a cemetery, but the high water table prevented this. The community is surrounded by fields; agriculture is still an important part of the economy of north east Fife (although few Springfield residents work in agriculture).

After World War II, a considerable number of council houses were built in the village, creating new communities in Crawley Crescent, Tarvit Terrace and several other streets. Many of these local authority-owned houses have since been bought by their former tenants. One of the largest local employers is Stratheden Hospital, a psychiatric hospital located between Springfield and Cupar. Springfield has a pub, shop, parish church, village hall, primary school and a railway station on the Edinburgh to Aberdeen Line.

== Notable people ==
Agnes Fraser (1876–1968) actress and soprano
