= Baintown =

Coordinates: 56.21°N 03.04°W

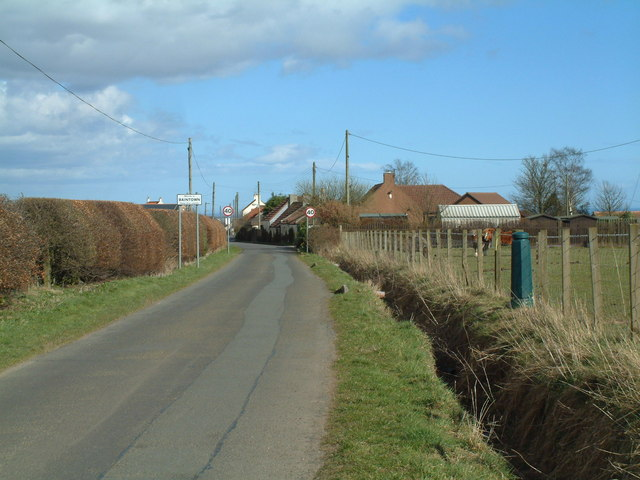
- Entering Baintown from the north-west

- Location within Fife
- OS grid reference: NO3503
- Council area: Fife
- Country: Scotland
- Sovereign state: United Kingdom
- Police: Scotland
- Fire: Scottish
- Ambulance: Scottish

Baintown is a hamlet located in Fife, a council area of Scotland, UK.
