= River Eden, Fife =

Scottish river flowing into North Sea

Coordinates: 56.36506°N 2.84821°W

Designations

Ramsar Wetland
- Official name: Firth of Tay and Eden Estuary
- Designated: 28 July 2000
- Reference no.: 1034

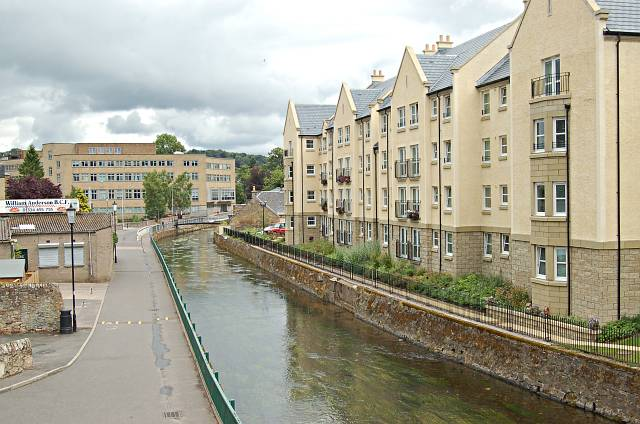
River Eden in Cupar

The River Eden is a river in Fife in Scotland, and is one of Fife's two principal rivers, along with the Leven. It is nearly 30 miles (48 km) long and has a fall of around 300 feet (91 m).

== Course ==
The source of the Eden is either at the confluence of the two burns (streams), named the Carmore and the Beatie, across the A91 road from the hamlet of Burnside, near the border with Perth & Kinross, or further upstream the Carmore near the M90 motorway. In the latter case, this first two-mile stretch of the Eden (before Burnside) forms part of the border between Fife and Perth & Kinross.

From Burnside, the Eden slowly flows across the Howe of Fife (a flat and waterlogged basin drained in the 18th and 19th centuries) through the village of Strathmiglo, then south of the town of Auchtermuchty, and through the market town of Cupar to Guardbridge, where it enters the North Sea via the Eden Estuary, a nature reserve and an important conservation area for wading birds. The river holds a good stock of wild brown trout and hosts a fair run of sea trout and Atlantic salmon.

In previous centuries, its water was used to power mills on its banks, and there was a paper mill at Guardbridge until July 2008.

The Eden Estuary is a Local Nature Reserve (LNR) and, along with the Firth of Tay, was designated a Ramsar site on 28 July 2000.

Both estuaries host a variety of recreational activities. The Eden estuary, being significantly smaller than the Tay, has few boating opportunities, but is an important recreation site for birdwatchers and naturalists, foreshore shellfish collectors, fishing enthusiasts and wildfowlers.

== Name ==
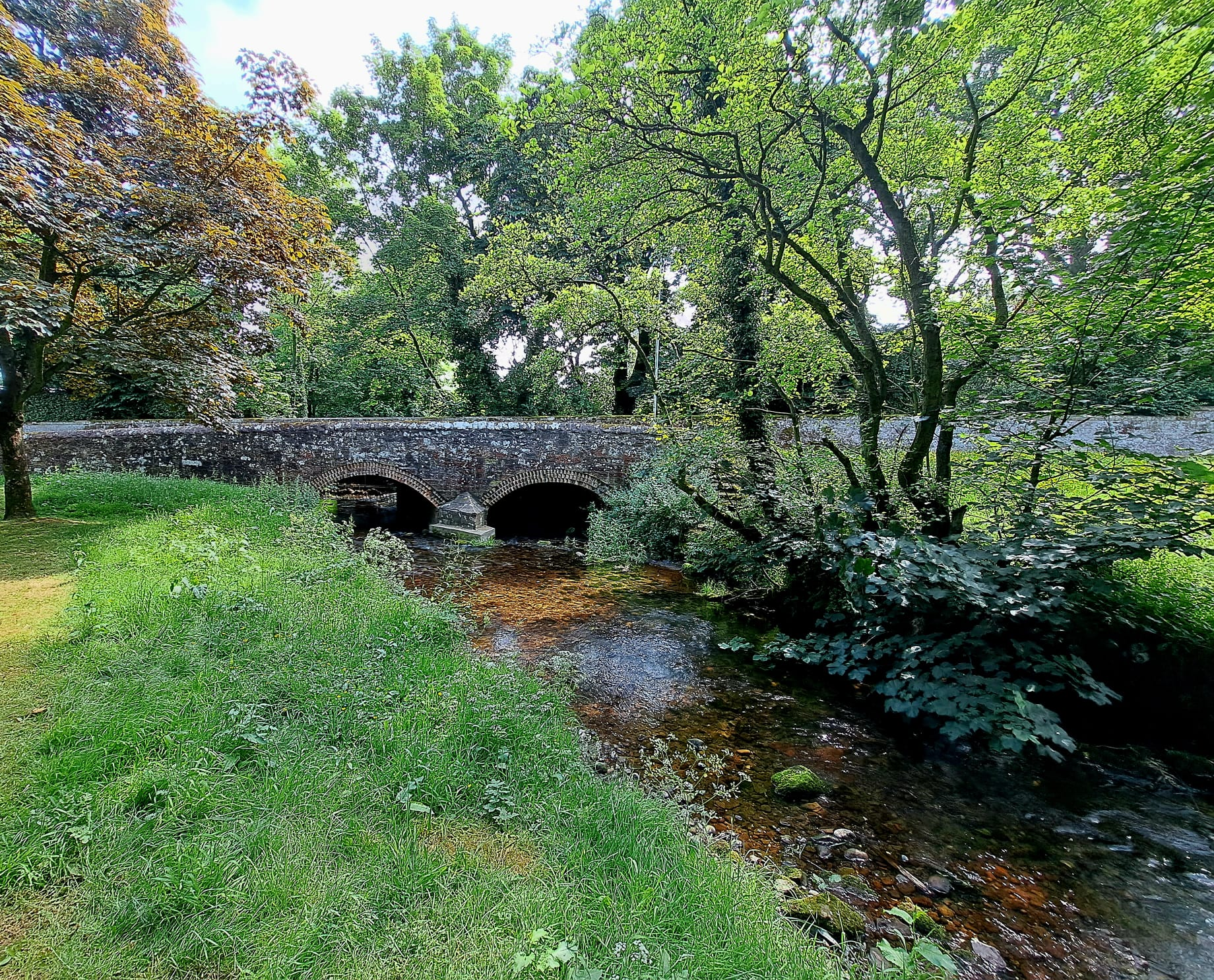
River Eden in Strathmiglo

There are several rivers in the UK named Eden. This name derives from the Celtic word ituna, meaning water, or rushing. The name is not related to the Garden of Eden. The upper stretch of the river was, before the early 19th century, called Miglo, which is a Pictish name with the similar meaning to the Celtic ituna. From this comes the name of Strathmiglo village, where strath means a wide valley.

In 1829-1926, there was a whisky distillery named Stratheden in the town of Auchtermuchty. Eden Mill is a currently operating distillery in Guardbridge.

The village of Gateside on the north bank of the upper Eden includes the former settlements of Edensbank and Edentown.
