= KY postcode area =

Postcode area within the United Kingdom

Kirkcaldy
- Postcode area
- Coordinates: 56.165°N 3.200°W
- Country: United Kingdom
- Postcode area: KY
- Postcode area name: Kirkcaldy
- Post towns: 13
- Postcode districts: 17
- Postcode sectors: 75
- Postcodes (live): 9,938
- Postcodes (total): 13.127
- Statistics as at May 2020

The KY postcode area, also known as the Kirkcaldy postcode area, is a group of sixteen postcode districts in eastern Scotland, within thirteen post towns. These cover most of Fife (including Kirkcaldy, Dunfermline, Glenrothes, St Andrews, Anstruther, Burntisland, Cowdenbeath, Cupar, Inverkeithing, Kelty, Leven and Lochgelly), plus the far south of Perth and Kinross (including Kinross itself).

Mail for the KY postcode area is processed at Edinburgh Mail Centre, along with mail for the EH, PH, DD, FK and TD postcode areas.

== Coverage ==
The approximate coverage of the postcode districts:

Postcode district	Post town	Coverage	Local authority area(s)
KY1	KIRKCALDY	Kirkcaldy (east), Dysart, Thornton, Wemyss	Fife
KY2	KIRKCALDY	Kirkcaldy (west), Auchtertool	Fife
KY3	BURNTISLAND	Burntisland, Kinghorn, Aberdour	Fife
KY4	COWDENBEATH	Cowdenbeath, Hill of Beath, Crossgates	Fife
KY4	KELTY	Kelty	Fife
KY5	LOCHGELLY	Lochgelly, Cardenden, Ballingry, Kinglassie	Fife
KY6	GLENROTHES	Glenrothes (west), Leslie, Kinnesswood	Fife, Perth and Kinross
KY7	GLENROTHES	Glenrothes (centre and east), Markinch, Star	Fife
KY8	LEVEN	Leven, Buckhaven, Methil, Methilhill, Largo, Windygates, Kennoway	Fife
KY9	LEVEN	Earlsferry, Elie, Kilconquhar, Largoward	Fife
KY10	ANSTRUTHER	Anstruther, Cellardyke, Kilrenny, Pittenweem, St Monans, Crail, Arncroach	Fife
KY11	DUNFERMLINE	Dunfermline (south and east), Rosyth, Dalgety Bay, Limekilns, Charlestown	Fife
KY11	INVERKEITHING	Inverkeithing, North Queensferry	Fife
KY12	DUNFERMLINE	Dunfermline (centre, north and west), Rumbling Bridge, Culross	Fife
KY13	KINROSS	Kinross, Milnathort, Balado, Scotlandwell	Perth and Kinross
KY14	CUPAR	Newburgh, Gateside	Fife, Perth and Kinross
KY15	CUPAR	Cupar, Ceres, Kilmany, Strathmiglo, Falkland, Ladybank, Freuchie, Kingskettle	Fife
KY16	ST. ANDREWS	St Andrews, Kingsbarns, Dunino, Guardbridge, Leuchars, St. Michaels, (Note: contains KY16 0DU) Balmullo	Fife
KY99	DUNFERMLINE	VISA Special Postcode	non-geographic

== Map ==
KY postcode area map, showing postcode districts in red and post towns in grey text, with links to nearby DD, EH, FK and PH postcode areas.

== See also ==
- Postcode Address File
- List of postcode areas in the United Kingdom
