= Drumeldrie =

Hamlet in Fife, Scotland

Coordinates: 56°13′06″N 2°54′05″W

Drumeldrie is a hamlet in the East Neuk area of Fife, Scotland. It is to the east of Upper Largo and is on the A917 road.

It is around a 15-minute walk from the main road down to Dumbarnie beach.
