= Knockdavie Castle =

Ruined 17th-century house in Fife, Scotland

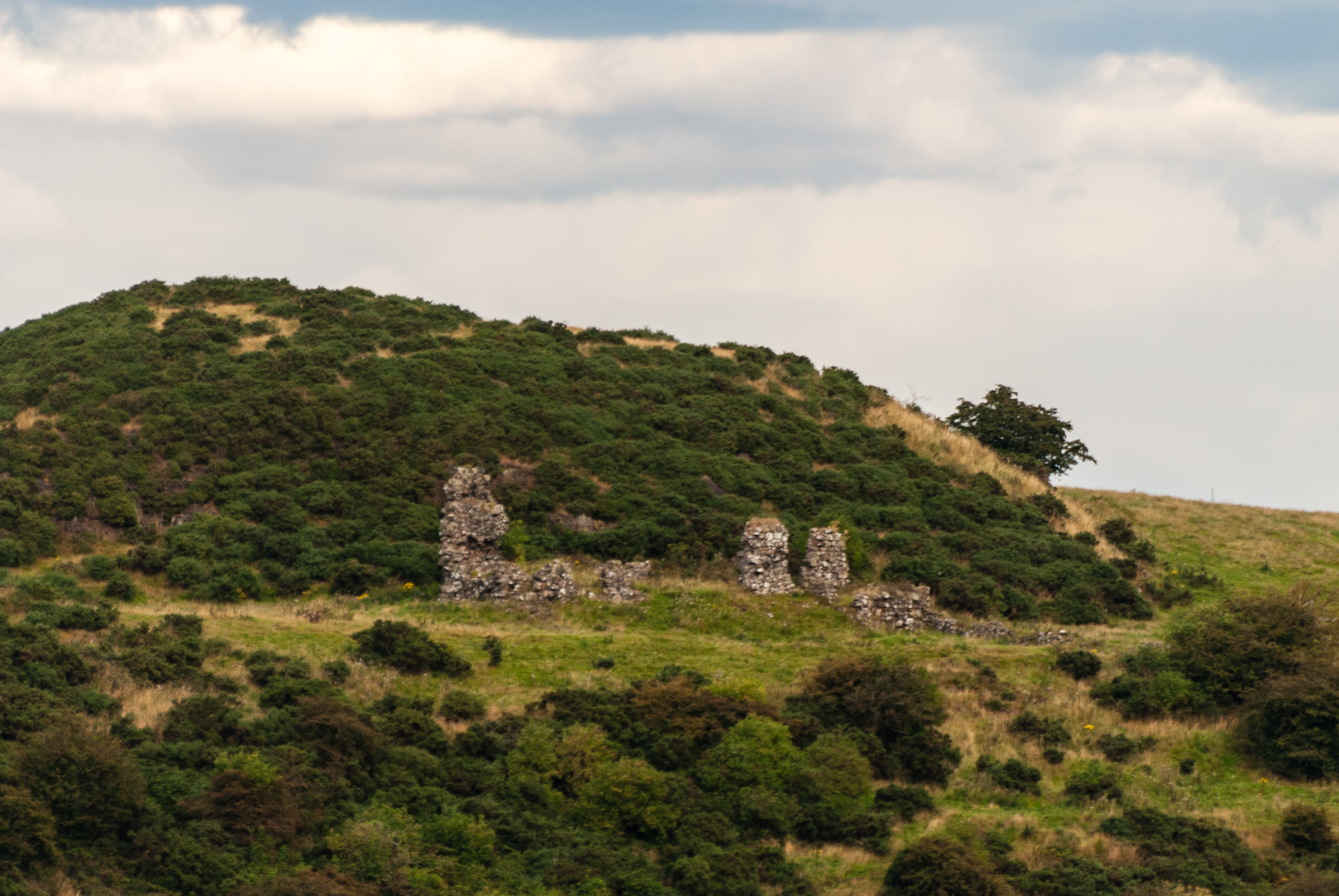
- Ruins of Knockdavie Castle
- Interactive map of Knockdavie Castle
- 56.08022°N 3.26797°W
- Location: Burntisland, Fife, Scotland

Site notes
- Governing body: Historic Environment Scotland

Scheduled monument
- Official name: Knockdavie Castle
- Designated: 20 January 1992
- Reference no.: SM5251

Knockdavie Castle is a now-ruined 17th-century house in Burntisland parish, Fife, Scotland. The name probably derives from the Gaelic cnoc dubh -in "(place of the) black hill(ock)", with cnoc dabhoch “the hill farm” another theory. It is recorded under the alternative name of Stenhouse (stone house) in 1561, which survives in the name of the modern day adjacent farmhouse. It is said to have belonged, in the seventeenth century, to a Douglas, recorded in an appendix to The Scots Worthies as an opponent of the Covenanters.

== See also ==
- Scheduled monuments in Fife
