= Comrie, Fife =

Coordinates: 56.08558°N 3.57751°W

Comrie: Scottish Gaelic: Comraidh
- Location within Fife
- Area: 0.199 km^{2} (0.077 sq mi)
- Population: 830 (2020)
  - Density: 4,171/km^{2} (10,800/sq mi)
- OS grid reference: NT0188
- Council area: Fife
- Shire county: Fife
- Country: Scotland
- Sovereign state: United Kingdom
- Police: Scotland
- Fire: Scottish
- Ambulance: Scottish
- UK Parliament: Dunfermline and West Fife
- Scottish Parliament: Dunfermline

Comrie (/ˈkʌmri/ locally or /ˈkɒmri/); is a village in Fife, Scotland, located immediately west of the neighbouring village of Oakley, 6.2 miles (9.98 km) west of Dunfermline on the A907. In 2019 it had an estimated population of 810.

== Description ==
The village primarily consists of modern housing schemes. There is also a community centre and one pub. Services including a health centre are located in Oakley. The Comrie Burn runs through the south of the village, and the Blair Burn to the east separates Comrie from Oakley.

=== Education ===
Children in Comrie are within the catchment area of Inzievar (non-denominational) and Holy Name (Catholic) primary schools, both located in one building in Oakley. High school pupils attend Queen Anne (non-denominational) or St Columba's, both located in Dunfermline.

=== Transport ===
The 4, 6 and 28 bus services run from Comrie through to Dunfermline.
