= Bowershall =

Coordinates: 56.10°N 03.46°W

Bowershall: Scots: Bouershauch
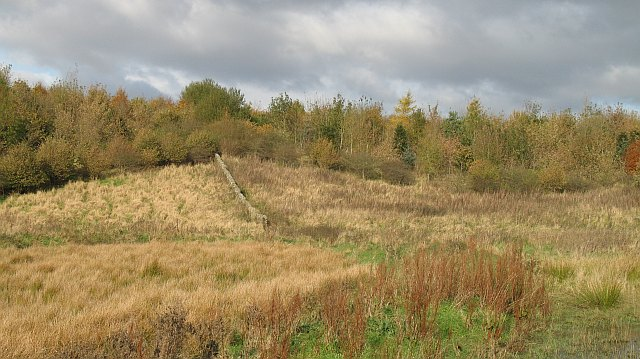
- Balmule Farm

- Location within Fife
- OS grid reference: NT0991
- Council area: Fife
- Country: Scotland
- Sovereign state: United Kingdom
- Police: Scotland
- Fire: Scottish
- Ambulance: Scottish
- UK Parliament: Dunfermline and West Fife
- Scottish Parliament: Dunfermline

Bowershall is a village in Fife, Scotland, UK, situated near Craigluscar Hill, two miles north of Dunfermline, one mile north of Townhill, and to the west of Loch Fitty, south of the B915.
