= Gateside, Fife =

Coordinates: 56.26911°N 3.32236°W

Gateside
- Location within Fife
- OS grid reference: NO182093
- Council area: Fife
- Lieutenancy area: Fife
- Country: Scotland
- Sovereign state: United Kingdom
- UK Parliament: North East Fife
- Scottish Parliament: North East Fife

Gateside is a small village in the north east of Fife, Scotland. It is inhabited by around 200 people. It also comprises a school (which is currently closed due to lack of primary aged pupils to attend), a park, seven-a-side football pitch, there used to be a village shop, and a pub (The Gateside Inn) which has now been converted into a private residence, the Gateside Memorial Hall and a garage (the Minimart). Gateside won a Tesco Magazine competition in 2012 and was named the "Friendliest Street in the UK."

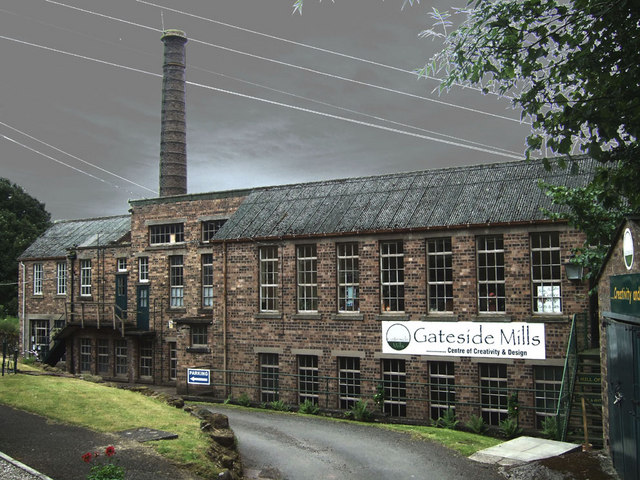
Former mill at Gateside

The River Eden runs through the village, which flows to Guardbridge and then into the North Sea. The nearest city is Perth.
