= Coaltown of Wemyss =

Village in Fife, Scotland

Coordinates: 56.151°N 3.089°W

Coaltown of Wemyss: Coaltoun o Weems
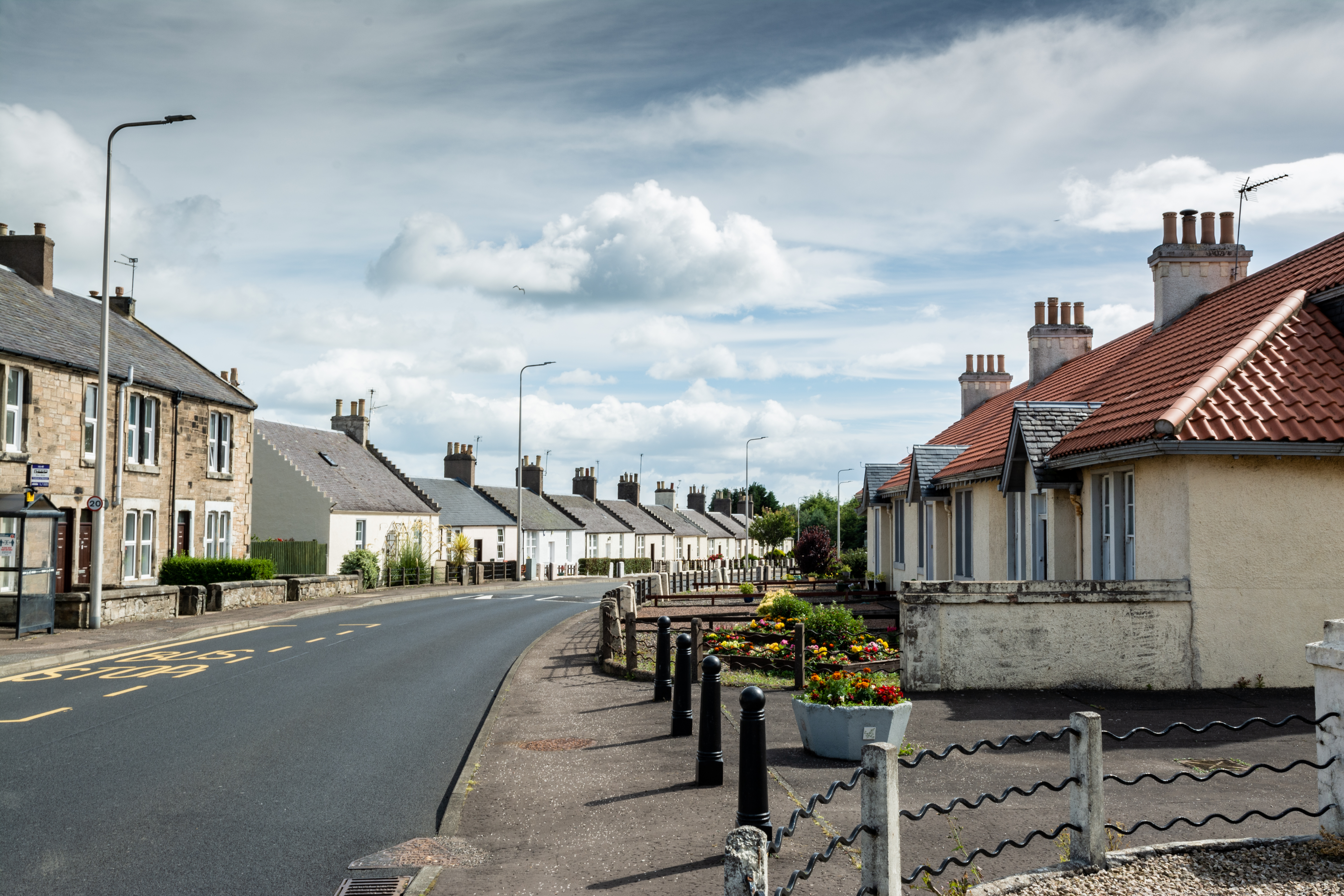
- Coaltown of Wemyss, main street

- Location within Fife
- Population: 710 (2020)
- Council area: Fife
- Country: Scotland
- Sovereign state: United Kingdom
- Police: Scotland
- Fire: Scottish
- Ambulance: Scottish

Coaltown of Wemyss is a village in south-east Fife, Scotland, around 5 km north of Kirkcaldy. The town was built in the 1890s as an estate village on the lands of nearby Wemyss Castle to house - as the name implies - mineworkers employed in several coal mines in the area. The miners' cottages were designated as a conservation area in 1980. Today the Coaltown has a primary school, some small shops, and the Earl David Hotel, named after David Wemyss, 2nd Earl of Wemyss. Wemyss Castle itself is not open to the public but its gardens can be visited during summer.
