= Saline, Fife =

Village and parish in Fife, Scotland

Coordinates: 56.115°N 3.574°W

Saline: Scottish Gaelic: Sabhlan
- Location within Fife
- Population: 1,370 (2020)
- OS grid reference: NT022924
- Council area: Fife
- Country: Scotland
- Sovereign state: United Kingdom
- Police: Scotland
- Fire: Scottish
- Ambulance: Scottish
- UK Parliament: Dunfermline and West Fife
- Scottish Parliament: Dunfermline

Saline (Scottish Gaelic: Sabhlan, earlier Sabhlaín, lit. 'little barn'; probably because tributes for the Crown were collected in a barn here in ancient times) is a village and parish in Fife, Scotland, situated 5 miles (8.0 km) to the north-west of Dunfermline. It lies in an elevated position on the western slopes of the Cleish Hills.

At the 2001 census the population was 1188, a decline from the 1235 recorded in the 1991 census. The village has a primary school, a parish church and a golf course. The glen runs from the bottom of the main street through to neighbouring Steelend.

The civil parish has a population of 1,762 (in 2011) and an area of 8,757 acres.

The village is dominated to the east-north-east by Saline Hill, 359 meters OD, with a hill fort on the eastern summit. The smaller hill to the south of east at Bandrum has a standing stone on the peak.

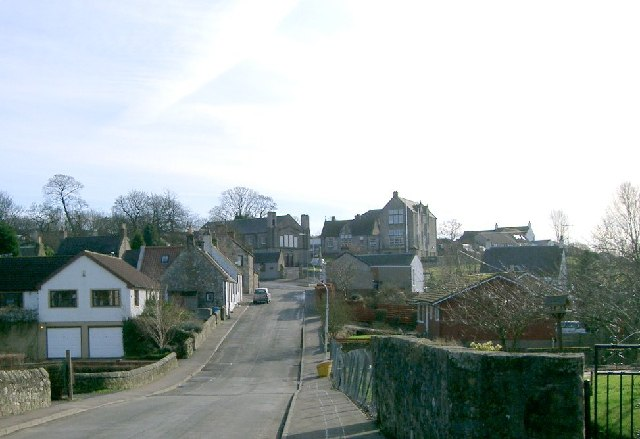

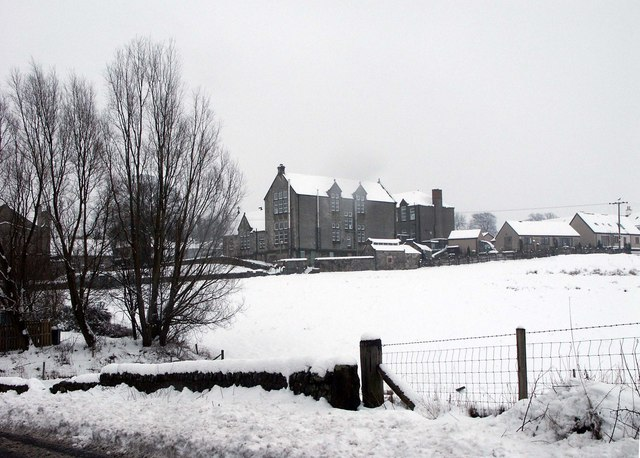
Saline Primary School and its "Sitooterie" in the snow

== History ==
A pre-Reformation church was under control of Dunkeld Cathedral.

Formerly a weaving centre, Saline was not much redeveloped during the 19th and 20th centuries as the expansion of industrial mining in west Fife largely passed it by. As a result, Saline contains a sizable number of listed buildings, mostly 18th century weavers' cottages.

The parish church was designed by William Stark in 1808 and remodelled in 1905 by Glasgow architect Peter MacGregor Chalmers. Following the Disruption of 1843 a Free Church was built on Bridge Street by Lewis Mercer.

== Famous residents ==
Thomas Bonnar (1821–1862), an architect, was born here.

John Barrowman (–1860), inventor of the Barrowman plough lived here.
