= Oakley, Fife =

Village in Fife, Scotland

Coordinates: 56.07°N 03.56°W

Oakley
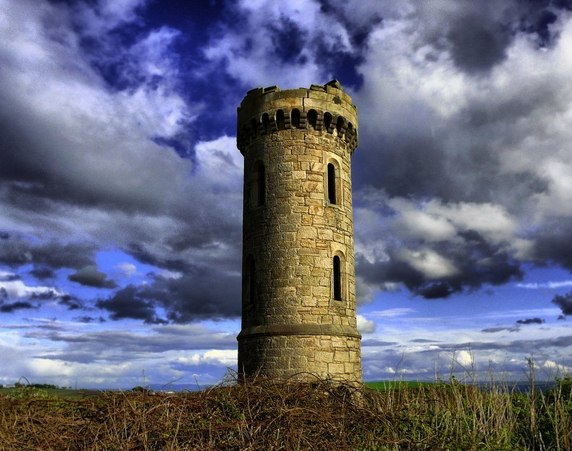
- Blair Tower, north-east of Oakley

- Location within Fife
- Population: 2,240 (2020)
- OS grid reference: NT0388
- Council area: Fife
- Shire county: Fife
- Country: Scotland
- Sovereign state: United Kingdom
- Police: Scotland
- Fire: Scottish
- Ambulance: Scottish
- UK Parliament: Dunfermline and West Fife
- Scottish Parliament: Dunfermline

Oakley is a village in Fife, Scotland located at the mutual border of Carnock and Culross parishes, Fife, 5 1/2 miles (9 kilometres) west of Dunfermline on the A907.

The village was built in connection with the Forth or Oakley Ironworks (1846), now all gone along with the colliery industry. The ironworks, which ceased production many years ago, had six furnaces, with stacks 180 feet (55 metres) high, and the engine-house was built with walls to comprise 60 cu ft (1.7 m^{3}) of stone below the surface of the ground. Subsequent to their use in the ironworks, the buildings were used as a sawmill producing rough timber for railway sleepers, fence posts and the like. Comrie Colliery closed in 1986, and the village took many years to recover from this major employer's demise.

== Description ==
Amenities include: three parks, one of which is attached to the local community centre in the north of the village and has astroturf sports pitches available to the surrounding areas; Blairwood Park, Oakley United's football ground; a cycle track which was formerly a railway line that ran from Dunfermline to Stirling and provides access to the local countryside; a Co-Operative which doubles as a Post Office; two hair salons; a bakers; a butchers; a pharmacy; three hot food takeaways; a café and a few other grocery stores.

Two burns merge in the south-west of the village, the Blair and Carnock Burns, providing another scenic walking area. The Blair Burn, which flows on the west side of the village, divides Oakley from the neighbouring village of Comrie, while the Carnock Burn divides the east part of the village in two north–south. There are religious establishments; the Holy Name Catholic Church was designed by the prolific church architect Charles W Gray and contains magnificent stained-glass windows by Gabriel Loire, a French stained glass artist of the 20th century, is well subscribed to. The church was built in 1956–58 for Roman Catholic miners who moved from Lanarkshire to work in the more prosperous coalfields of West Fife. The Oakley Parish church is a slightly smaller church for those of Protestant denomination and is also used for various activities aimed at all ages.

Most of the houses in Oakley were built in the 1950s for incoming mineworkers from the west coast; these have since been purchased by the occupants. There is a pub, The Greyhound Bar, in the centre of the village, and a Social Club on the main A907. There is a small industrial estate to the north of the village, providing some employment around the area.

To the south lies Inzievar House once visited by Jules Verne, now converted into flats. There is a thriving broad wood industry operated by Scottish Woods in the estate.

=== Education ===
There were two primary schools situated in Oakley, one Roman Catholic named Holy Name, the other Inzievar primary. However, in 2007 a new building, Oakley Campus, was built to house both schools along with the village library.

=== Public library ===
The library has limited opening hours and is situated within the Oakley Campus. Information resources including community information and reference materials are also available, as is access to the internet.

=== Health ===
Oakley Health Centre provides a wide and comprehensive programme of health care including a dental surgery, podiatry clinic, physiotherapy clinic, and cardiology unit.

=== Transport ===
Stagecoach run the services 4 and 4A which run frequently from the new Dunfermline Bus station from around 05:30 until 23:45.
