= Star, Fife =

Village in Fife, Scotland, UK

Coordinates: 56.2174°N 3.1096°W

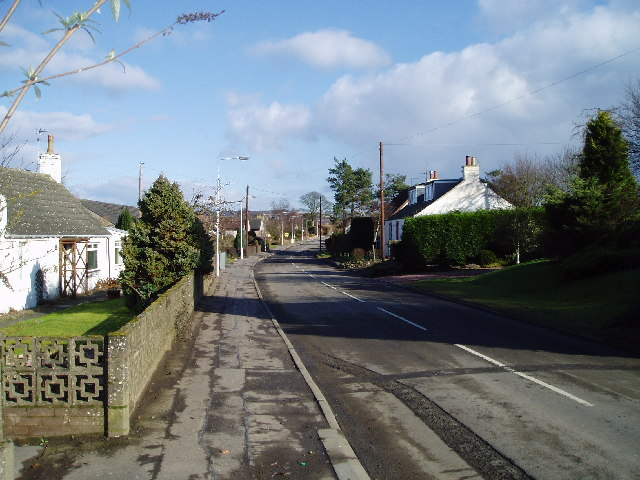

Star, also known as Star of Markinch (and historically as Star of Brunton or Star of Dalginch), is a small village in Fife, Scotland.

The name of Star derives from the causeway (stair) over the Star Moss, a raised bog to the northwest of the village which drains out to land to the north of the village. East of the village are two reservoirs, taking advantage of the already wet conditions. The boggy conditions attract thousands of overwintering greylag geese. Skeins of them can be seen flying over the village from October until early May.

Both the Star Moss and the nearby Carriston Reservoir are sites of special scientific interest.

== History ==
Originally the village consisted of linen weavers' cottages, to support the large flax growing and linen weaving industry of Fife in the 17-1800s. These original cottages were usually of two rooms, one for the family to live in and one for the loom. There are also some original farm workers' cottages. These older cottages have been developed and extended but remain interesting and attractive.

To the north of the village are the notable old farms of Carriston (originally Carrelstoun) and Pyeston which were originally ferm touns i.e. small clusters of habitation engaged in agriculture. Carriston Farm has a notable large house; originally built around 1700, it has a large Victorian extension and tower added on.

Pyeston farmhouse also dates to about 1700, although not as grand in design. An old "doocot" or dovecote (circa 1700) is located nearby. This would have supplied fresh meat in the winter for the inhabitants of Pyeston.

Star has continued expanding since the 1970s, with a current population of around 500. Most of the housing is strung out along the main road for over a mile with several newer cul-de-sacs on either side. Most homes are single-storey, or 1 1/2-storey houses. Recently the residents vigorously rejected a village expansion programme for affordable housing.

== Location ==
Star is regarded generally as a quiet and fairly affluent village. Most inhabitants work in neighbouring towns within Fife or further afield in cities like Edinburgh, Dundee or Perth.

Star is located between Markinch and Kennoway. It benefits from views of the Lomond Hills to the west. It is fairly close to the A92 trunk road, and Markinch railway station on the East Coast Main Line is about six minutes by car. Edinburgh is about an hour away by car and St Andrews approximately thirty minutes.

== Amenities ==
The village shop closed around 1985, and the post-office not long after. Star Primary School and a community hall remain.

Star Primary School has benefited from the recent housing boost, although it had been threatened with closure many times in the past. The primary school dates from 1816, with later additions to the building. There are around 25 children enrolled in the school, absence rates are slightly higher for a school of this size and has reasonable attainment level. There is currently one full time and two teachers who are both part time, whilst the remaining teaching is provided by assistants. School meals are transported daily from Markinch Primary due to staffing cuts several years ago. The school has no physical education facilities other than a local community hall which has been under the veil of closure for some time.

== Development ==
The draft Kirkcaldy and Mid Fife local plan, which is a regional plan to increase housing, proposed a number of sites around the village for substantial developments, although these have all been decided against.

== Recreation ==
The village was home to Star Hearts AFC, one of the most successful amateur football clubs to come out of Fife. The club was co-founded in 1962 by David Leitch who, at the time, worked on Carriston Farm. They were the first Fife amateur club to win the Scottish Amateur Cup in 1975 and are record 10-time winners of the Fife Amateur Cup.

After 50 years in the Fife amateurs they formed Kennoway Star Hearts along with officials from Kennoway AFC, and joined the SJFA East Region in 2013. Kennoway Star Hearts play their games at Treaton Park in Star and now compete in the East of Scotland League First Division.

The community hall is used by such groups as The Youth Club, WRI, Bowls, Toddlers' Group and Machine Knitting Club.

The local Community Council was re-established in May 2014.

Every year the village puts on a gala day which is well attended by residents. Gala Day is followed by a week of other community events usually culminating in a ceilidh in the village hall.
