= Guardbridge =

Coordinates: 56.36254°N 2.89175°W

Guardbridge: Scots: Gaire Brig
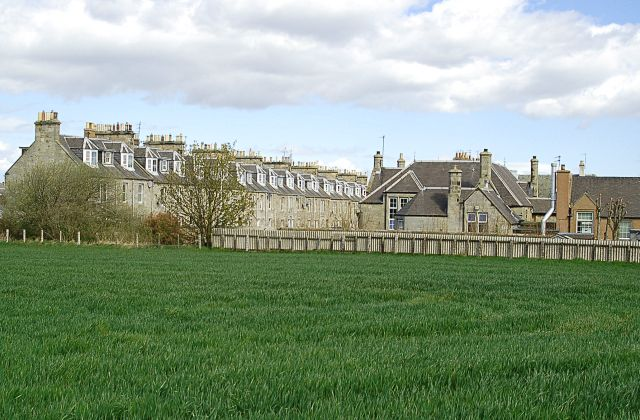

- Location within Fife
- Population: 840 (2020)
- OS grid reference: NO466189
- Council area: Fife
- Lieutenancy area: Fife
- Country: Scotland
- Sovereign state: United Kingdom
- Post town: ST ANDREWS
- Postcode district: KY16
- Dialling code: 01334
- Police: Scotland
- Fire: Scottish
- Ambulance: Scottish
- UK Parliament: North East Fife
- Scottish Parliament: North East Fife

Guardbridge (Scots: Gairbrig) is a town in the north-east of Fife, on the east coast of Scotland. It is approximately 3 miles (5 km) north-west of St Andrews, and is situated on the estuary of the River Eden, at the junction of the A91 road between St Andrews and Stirling and the A919/A914 road between Leuchars and the Tay Road Bridge.

Guardbridge has a number of local amenities including a school, general store, garages, hotel, takeaway food shop, hairdresser, furniture maker, and bowling and fishing clubs. The village has also become a very popular dormitory settlement due to its close proximity to St Andrews and Dundee.

== History ==
The village takes its name from the 15th-century six-arched bridge built by Bishop Henry Wardlaw, who founded the University of St Andrews. Some have said the bridge was built to assist pilgrims en route to St Andrews; however, its purpose was to provide safe access for students to ensure the success of Wardlaw's university.

Though the first element of the name is anglicized as 'Guard', the origin of the name has never been satisfactorily explained. As alternatives are less credible, the theory that this may come from "gare", the French term for statio, an assembly point for pilgrims, retains some credence in academic sources. Others cast doubt on such usage of "gare" before the 18th century. Alternative theories include the Scots words "gair", meaning muddy, or, though unlikely, "gerr", meaning clumsy or awkward. The bridge is a Category A listed building.

St Andrews was one of the most important pilgrimage centres in Europe. Hostels were available every 6 miles along the pilgrim trail, with the last one located at Guardbridge. There, up to 600 pilgrims were provided with dormitories, a refectory and a church. From that point, the Augustinians regulated the numbers travelling into the holy city of St Andrews. The average stay in the town was three months.

In 1852, the north-east Fife railway line was extended to St Andrews and a viaduct was built over the Eden. This St Andrews Railway was closed in 1969, not as part of the Beeching cuts, as is commonly supposed, but by British Rail. The viaduct was demolished, but its supporting piers are still visible in the river.

In 1873 William Haig and two of his sons formed the Guardbridge Paper Company. This was to find a more profitable use for their Seggie whisky distillery, which had been established there since 1810. The mill went into production in 1874. As the mill developed, the village grew around it, with new housing and roads to attract and accommodate workers. Before the First World War the labour force was over 400 and reached a peak of 620 in the late 1950s.

Between 1896 and 1914 fishermen dredged for mussels in the River Eden. The Annual Report of the Fishery Board for 1914 shows that eight fishermen were involved, but as no vessels are mentioned, presumably none was used. The value landed was £977. The report states that: "The demand for mussels was good, and the output shows an increase."

The paper mill was previously the main local industry and was operated by Curtis Fine Papers. The paper made in Guardbridge was used in making high quality books such as the 1977 Folio edition of the Lord of the Rings. On 24 July 2008 the mill went into receivership and 180 workers were made redundant. Many locals were employed elsewhere in Fife, Dundee, Edinburgh or even further afield. The University of St Andrews bought the 36 acres of the papermill in 2010 and the site is now call the Eden Campus.

== Notable residents ==
- David Finlay, recipient of the Victoria Cross
