= Kemback =

Village in Fife, Scotland

Coordinates: 56.3264°N 2.946°W

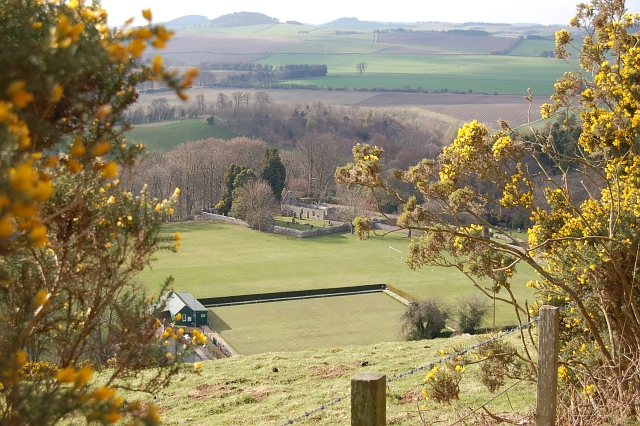

Kemback (Scottish Gaelic: Ceann Bac) is a village and parish in Fife, Scotland, located 2.5 miles (4.0 km) east of Cupar. The present village was developed in the 19th century to house those working the flax mills on the nearby Ceres Burn. From 1681 the minister for the parish was Alexander Edward, until 1689 when he was deprived as a non-juror. He went on to become an architect and landscape architect, working on schemes for Brechin Castle and Hamilton Palace.

The civil parish has a population of 558 (in 2011).

== History ==
The name of the village is from the Scottish Gaelic Ceann Bac meaning 'End of the Corner', from ceann meaning 'head' or 'end' and bac meaning 'hindrance', 'bend' or 'corner', particularly in a field used as a shelter for livestock.

== Parish Church ==
The church is dated 1582, making it one of the first Post-Reformation churches in Scotland. The windows were enlarged around 1760. The linked manse dates from around 1610 and was thatched until 1758.

== Transatlantic Radiophone Station ==
Kemback G.P.O. Transatlantic Radiophone Station (1927–1950s)

In 1927 the General Post Office opened a commercial radiophone service between Kemback and an AT&T site in New Jersey, USA. All that remains (2010) is a metal gate into an open field opposite the Kemback graveyard. The field was originally full of wooden huts, and the hill, and surrounding areas in the parish, were covered in aerials. The civilian GPO services were moved when line of sight was needed for television transmissions during the 1950s.

=== WWII Secret ===
Access to most of North Fife was restricted. The Kemback Radio Station was a critical link between Britain and the US, Iceland, Sweden, Norway, and Russia. Classed ULTRA secret, the Kemback station was also needed in the event of a retreat from England, and the loss of the transatlantic cables by the British forces and an equivalent Transatlantic RadioPhone site at Rugby, England. Obviously this eventuality was never needed.

Wartime records of the Station's use for radio interception as part of the network of Y-stations for German Enigma machine transmissions are still restricted, and have not been released into the public domain. It is unclear if the records survive in the National Archives or Bletchley Park.

Several staff based in GPO Kemback were transferred to the Far East in the early days of WW2 to Singapore. Some were captured, and held as prisoners of the Japanese for the remainder of the war.

== Medical conditions ==
The extremely marshy land immediately around the old and new Kemback churches was drained in the 17th and 18th centuries. A local condition called The Drop or The Ague is recorded in the histories of the Lairds of Kemback, and the archive of the Archbishop John Spottiswoode(1565–1639) which, although cannot be confirmed, is probably a form of malaria, similar to that seen in the Somerset levels.
