= Macduff =

Macduff may refer to:

== Fictional characters ==
- Macduff (Macbeth), a character in Shakespeare's Macbeth
- Lady Macduff, wife of Macduff in Macbeth
- Macduff's son in Macbeth
- Donald MacDuff, a character in Wee Willie Winkie
- Keiran MacDuff, a character in the Star Trek: The Next Generation episode "Conundrum"
- Richard MacDuff, a character in the Douglas Adams book Dirk Gently's Holistic Detective Agency

== People ==
- Clan MacDuff, a Scottish clan
- Macduff of Fife (fl. 1297–1298), figure in the Wars of Scottish Independence
- Alistair MacDuff (born 1945), British judge of the High Court of England and Wales
- Isabella MacDuff, Countess of Buchan (fl. 1306–1313), figure in the Wars of Scottish Independence
- Jack MacDuff (born 1950), Canadian air traffic controller and curler
- John Ross Macduff (1818–1895), Scottish divine and author
- Larry Mac Duff (born 1948), American football coach
- Macduff Everton (born 1947), American photographer

== Places ==
- Macduff, Aberdeenshire, Scotland, a town
  - Macduff Lifeboat Station
  - Macduff railway station
- MacDuff, Ontario, Canada, a community

== Other uses ==
- Marquess of Macduff and Earl of Macduff, titles attached to the title Duke of Fife in the Peerage of the United Kingdom
- MacDuff's Cross, Fife, Scotland, ancient monument
- Macduff's Castle, Fife, Scotland, ruined castle
- Macduff Distillery, Deveron, Scotland
- MacDuff v JCI, a case in South African contract law
- Scottish Feudal Barony of MacDuff, resulting in the change of the name of the Scottish town of Doune to Macduff, by Crown Charter

== See also ==
- McDuff, a surname
