= Gauldry =

Coordinates: 56.40475°N 3.00972°W

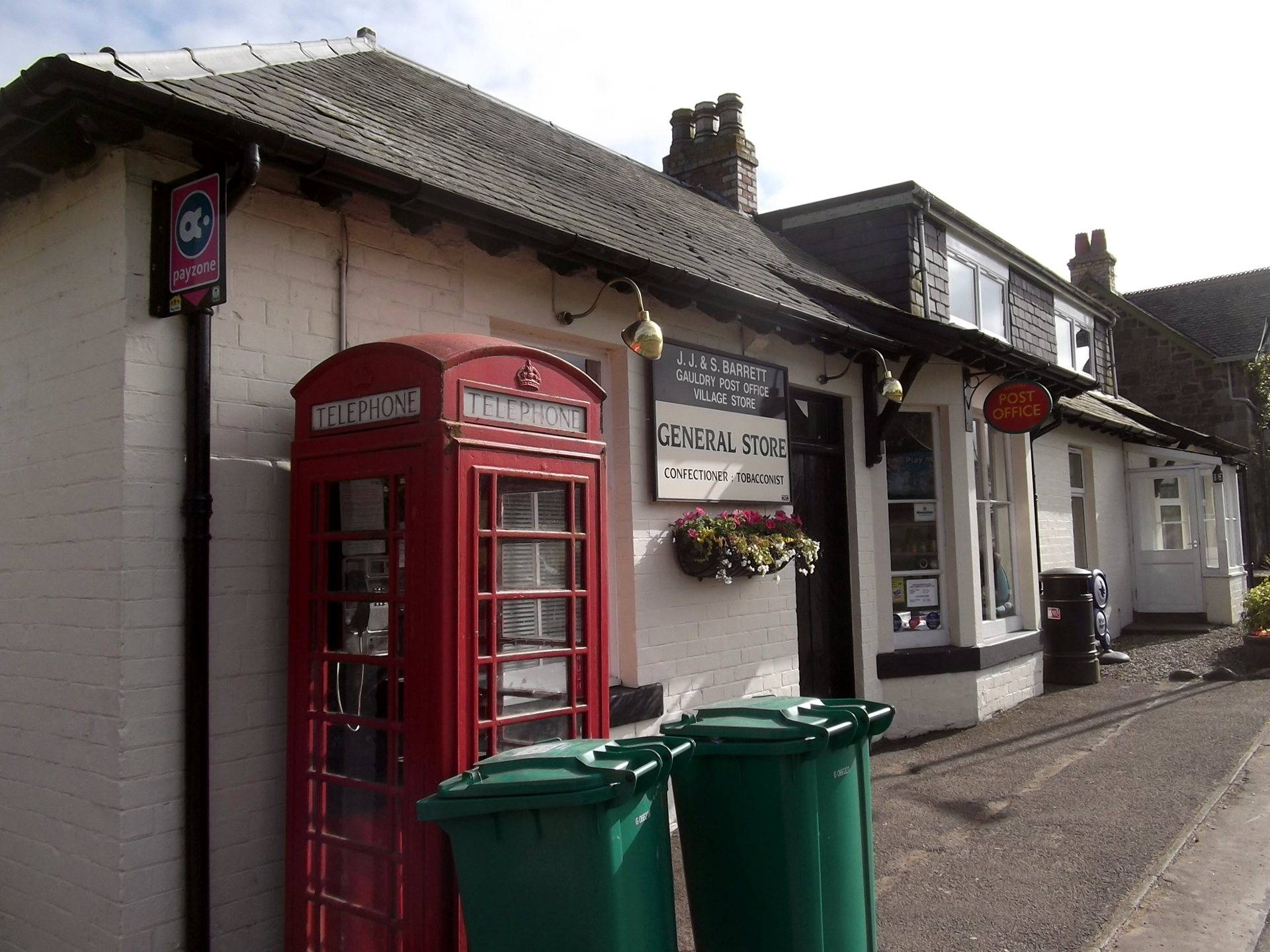
- Gauldry's local post office and general store

- Location within Fife
- Population: 650 (2020)
- OS grid reference: NO3624
- Council area: Fife
- Lieutenancy area: Fife
- Country: Scotland
- Sovereign state: United Kingdom
- Post town: NEWPORT-ON-TAY
- Postcode district: DD6
- Dialling code: 01382
- Police: Scotland
- Fire: Scottish
- Ambulance: Scottish
- UK Parliament: North East Fife
- Scottish Parliament: North East Fife

Gauldry, locally sometimes The Gauldry, is a village in Fife, Scotland. It is located 3 kilometres (1.9 mi) southwest of Newport on Tay, 2 kilometres (1.2 mi) south-east of Balmerino, and 1 kilometre (0.62 mi) south of Bottomcraig. It is also known as the home of Paterson Skip Hire (PSH).

The village is home to Balmerino Primary School and the Morison Duncan Hall. A pop-up post office operates on Wednesdays in the Morison Duncan Hall where all post office services are provided.

== Etymology ==
The name derives from the Scots gallow raw, originally referring to a row of houses leading towards the gallows on Gallow Hill to the east. In his 1642 map of Fife, James Gordon spells the name Gallery. The intrusive d first appears in the 18th century.

== History ==
The earliest known written mention of Gauldry can be found in a charter issued between 1328 and 1332 by John De Haya, the Lord of Naughton, in which he grants the monks of Balmerino Abbey a plot of his land lying west of Gauldry. In this charter the village is referred to as Galurau.

An ancient road connecting Balmerino to Strathkinness passed through Gauldry. Significant segments of the road survive today: Naughton Brae (known locally as The Stoney) in the north of the village and the straight dirt path on the western edge of Dandies Wood in the south. In the 13th century this road was used by the monks of Balmerino Abbey to transport stones from a quarry in Strathkinness that they were granted access to at some point between 1227 and 1250. The road likely acted as a highway to St Andrews and was most likely the road used by Queen Mary on her journey from Balmerino to St Andrews in 1565.

On the far east side of the village on what is now Priory Road stands what was once called Gallow Hill. According to Rev James Campbell, the sixteenth minister of Balmerino, Gallow Hill is likely the place where the Barony of Naughton were executed.

Much of the land Gauldry sits on was originally a moor. The vast majority of houses present in the village were built in the past two hundred years with the trade buildings historically clustered in the west end. Weaving was one of the most common professions.

Numerous private schools have existed in the village, though Balmerino Primary School has remained the only school in the village since its relocation from Bottomcraig in 1830. Gauldry Parish Church, previously a weaver's shop, entered into use as a church in 1843 when a newly-formed congregation under the Free Church of Scotland began congregating there. The parishioners in the village have historically attended the several parish churches that have existed in Balmerino, Kirkton, and Bottomcraig. Balmerino Parish Church in Bottomcraig has been the parish church since its construction in 1811. The Morison Duncan Hall was built in 1897.

=== 19th century ===
In 1830, the parish school located in Bottomcraig was relocated to Gauldry to a newly constructed building where it has since remained. It is located north of the Main Road in the west of the village. The first headteacher was Mr William Ballingall, a University of St Andrews alumnus who remained in this position for more than fifty years until his death in 1882.

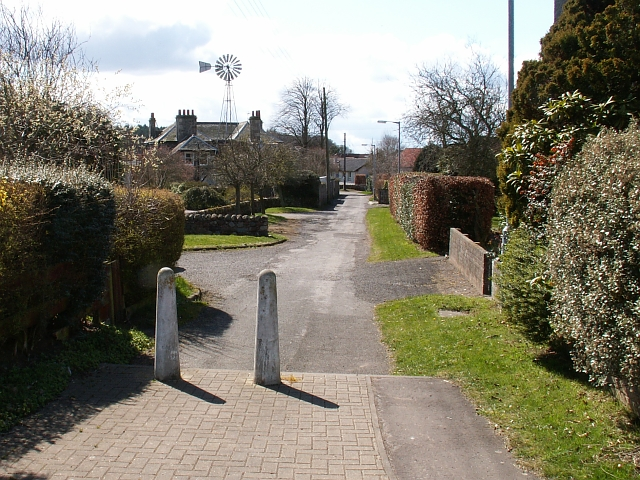
The former United Free Church of Scotland manse (left) at Windmill Road, Gauldry

The Gauldry church was started during the Great Disruption of 1843 when a newly-formed congregation in connection with the Free Church of Scotland began to congregate in the building under the ministry of Andrew Melville. The congregation gathered in the church building on the Main Road which was a weaver's shop at the time.

Andrew Melville, the original minister, had seceded from the nearby village of Logie. A manse and a free church were erected for him there. He performed the duties of both the Gauldry and Logie congregations until his death in 1848. He was succeeded by George R. Sommerville in 1852 when the Gauldry and Logie churches united.

The Morison Duncan Hall was built in 1897 to the east of the school for use as a village hall and reading room. It was built in memory of Mrs Morison-Duncan by her daughter Mrs Anstruther-Duncan two years after her mother's death.

=== 20th century ===
Since the inception of the Gauldry church it has transferred multiple times between denominations: in 1900 it transferred to the United Free Church of Scotland and then in 1929 to the Church of Scotland. In 1937 the church merged with the Balmerino Parish Church.

During this century, the village underwent major growth with the number of buildings doubling.

=== 21st century ===
For a number of years the parish services alternated weekly between the Gauldry Parish Church and Balmerino Parish Church in Bottomcraig until 2019 when services came to an end in Gauldry. Services continue to take place in Bottomcraig.

A further expansion of the village commenced in early 2022 with the start of the construction of 30 new Passivhaus homes in the south of the village. The construction is scheduled to be completed in June 2023.

== Demography ==
The population of Gauldry was estimated to be 660 in the mid-2012 census report.

The reported age composition of the population was reported as:

- 14.7% aged under 16
- 56.8% aged 16 to 64 years old
- 28.5% aged 65 and over

== Landmarks ==
=== Gauldry Parish Church ===
The Gauldry church stands on the south face of the Main Road in the east of the village. It was previously the "rough unfinished flat of a weaver's shop" but started to be used as a church in 1843 by a newly-formed Free Church of Scotland congregation.

In 1867, the congregation purchased the property so as to renovate it. The purchase was made possible by a donation from Mrs Morison-Duncan ― a wealthy Naughton resident and member of the congregation ― who offered to pay the costs as a gift to the church. The church was renovated in 1892. A bronze mural tablet was unveiled in the church in 1933 in memory of both Mrs Morison-Duncan and her daughter, Mrs Anstruther-Duncan, who also supported the church in her lifetime.

Services at the church came to an end in 2019 though they continue to take place in Bottomcraig.

=== Morison Duncan Hall ===
The Morison Duncan Hall is a village hall which stands in the west end of the village. It was erected in 1897 by Mrs Anstruther-Duncan to commemorate her late mother, Mrs Morison-Duncan, who had died three years prior and who, during her life, had wished for such a construction to take place. The hall was built on the Jubilee Recreation Ground which was gifted to the village by Mrs Morison-Duncan as a public park in 1887 in celebration of Queen Victoria's Golden Jubilee. The hall stands on the west end of this ground with the rest of the ground remaining a park today.

The hall was built for use as a village hall and reading room with a stage built in the east end to accommodate lectures and concerts. Bedrooms, parlours, and a kitchen were included in the construction with a caretaker's house also included in the north wing. In the original construction, a movable slide in the main hall was present to allow the room to be partitioned. The architect of the hall was Mr James Ritchie, an architect based in Perth. The hall continues to be used today as a village hall and on Wednesdays it operates as a pop-up post office.

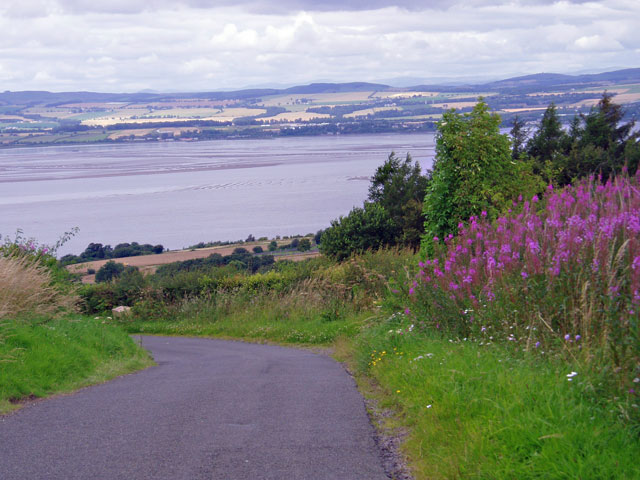
Road passing through Battle Law towards Balmerino

=== Battle Law ===
To the west periphery of Gauldry lies an area known historically as Battle Law. This area takes its name from a medieval battle which, according to local legend, took place there.

The legend states that in the end of the tenth century, during the period of Scandinavian conquest across parts of Scotland, Danes appeared in their ships in the River Tay. After being defeated in battle further west at the village of Luncarty, one group of the retreating Vikings appeared near the western edge of Gauldry. Here they engaged in battle with Pictish forces and, upon being defeated by the Picts, they are said to have retreated to their boats for refuge.

== Education ==
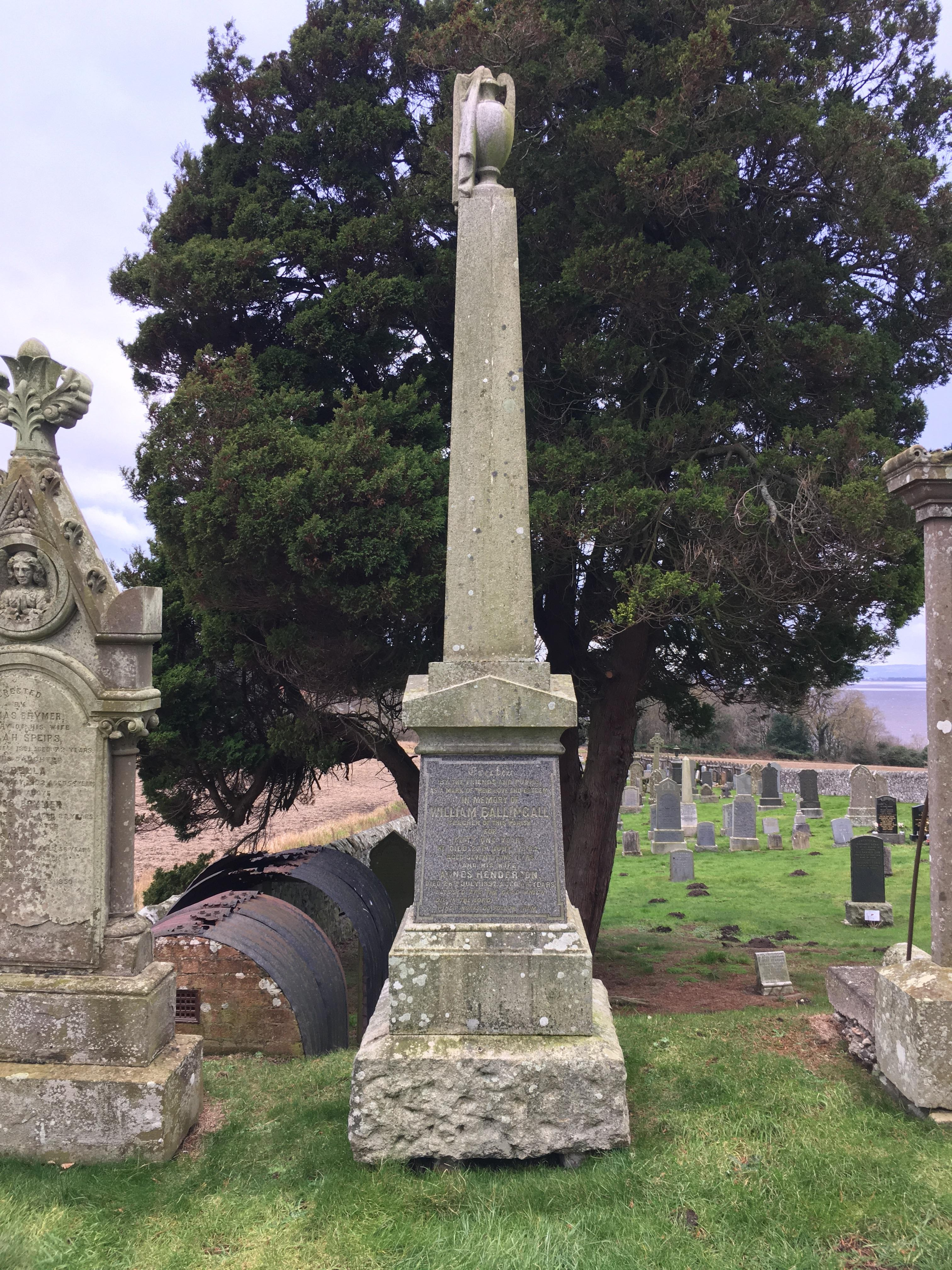
The tombstone of William Ballingall, the first headmaster at the village's school building.

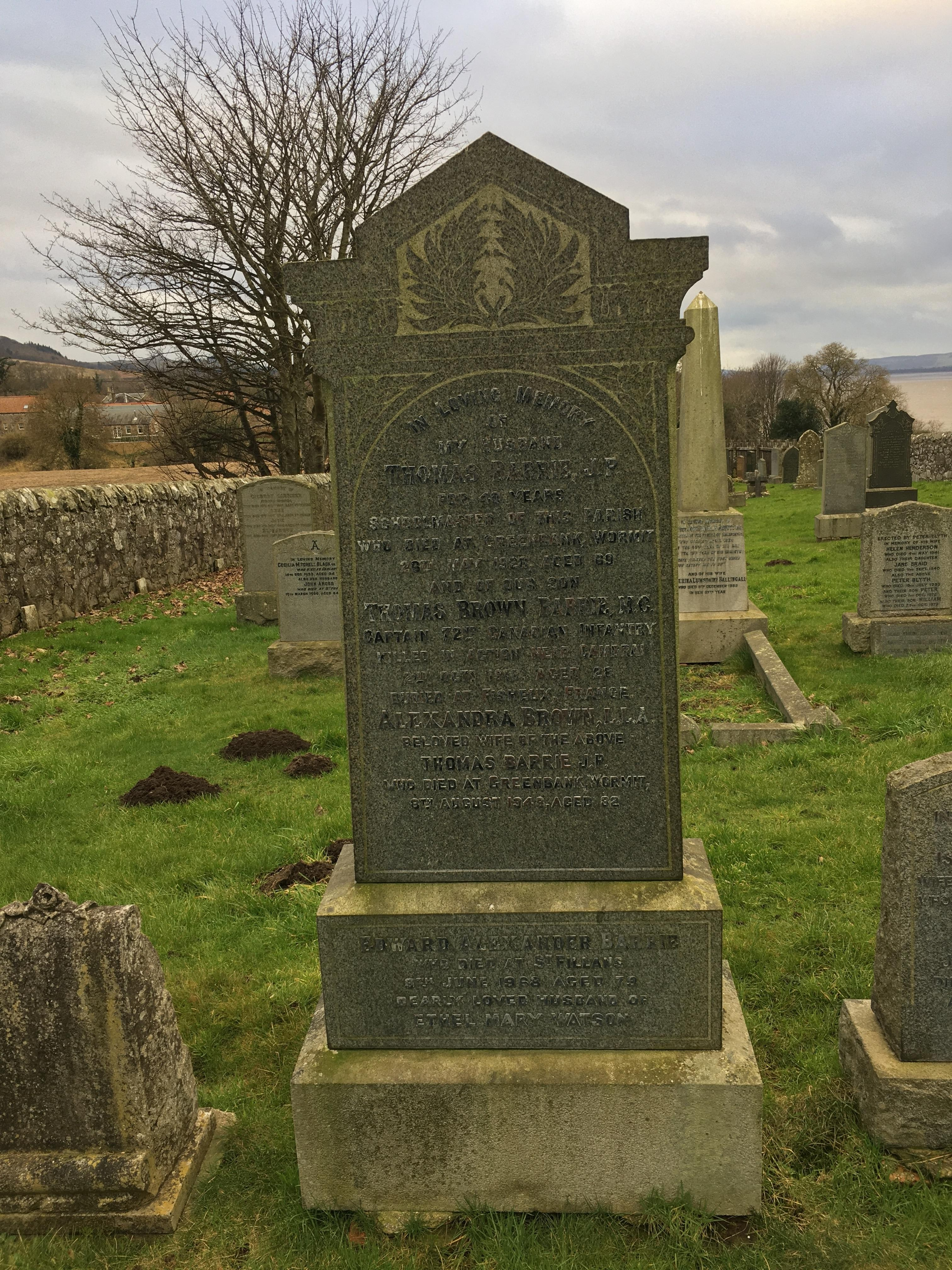
The tombstone of the headmaster Thomas Barrie, known affectionately as Barrie of Balmerino.

Gauldry is home to Balmerino Primary School which has been located there since 1830. The school, which at the time was a Church of Scotland parish school, was previously located in Bottomcraig where it had likely been constructed in 1776. Prior to this, the school had been located in Balmerino where it was first established in 1640 or 1641.

Old mentions of the school after its relocation to Gauldry show that it was referred to as both Balmerino Public School and Gauldry Public School. It is now known exclusively, however, as Balmerino Primary School, ultimately retaining the name of the parish.

The first headteacher at the school in its current location was William Ballingall. Mr Ballingall, who was an alumnus of the University of St Andrews and the recipient of many honorary awards from said institution, was described by Rev James Campbell as "a most successful teacher" who "excelled in the knowledge of mathematics". Mr Ballingall served as head of the school for more than half a century until his death in the school house in 1882. A monument in Balmerino churchyard was erected for him by his friends and former pupils.

=== Headteachers of Balmerino Primary School ===
	Name	Appointed	Notes
1	Mr James Sibbald	1641	Mentioned 1650
2	Mr David Leitch	Unknown	
3	Mr John Wyllie	1657	Died 1705
4	Mr Robert Wyllie	1706	Son of the previous headteacher
5	Mr William Jack	1712	
6	Mr William Dow	1729	
7	Mr William Arthur	1731	Student in divinity
8	Mr John Gow	1732	Music master in Cupar
9	Mr --- Myles	Unknown	Mentioned 1737 to 1742
10	Mr Alexander Brown	1742	
11	Mr George Gourlay	1744	
12	Mr George Paton	1755	
13	Mr Andrew Gray	1763	
14	Mr David Paton	1781	
15	Mr William Ballingall	1830	Died 1882
16	Mr Thomas Barrie	1882	Known as "Barrie of Balmerino"; Retired 1923; Died 1928 aged 69
	Mr Hugh Morrison	1923	Mentioned 11 January 1923
	Mr Hugh D. McCulloch	Unknown	Mentioned 1933; Moved to Auchterderran South School in May 1937
	Mr David A. Rodger	12 July 1937	Previously first assistant at Sinclairtown School, Kirkcaldy
	Mr John L. McFarlane	31 January 1949	Previously assistant science teacher at East Wemyss
	Mr George Turnbull	Unknown	Died 1996 aged 73
	Mrs Vivien Macqueen	Unknown	Mentioned 2019
	Mrs L. Jess	Unknown	Present August 2022

== See also ==
- Balmerino Parish Church, Bottomcraig
