= McDuff =

McDuff (also spelled Macduff) is a surname. It is the Anglicized form of the Scottish Gaelic name Mac Dhuibh (Mac = son, Dhuibh = dark/black). Notable people with the surname include:

- Caleb McDuff (born 2008), Welsh deaf racing driver
- David McDuff (born 1945), Scottish literary translator
- Dusa McDuff (born 1945), English mathematician
- Jack McDuff (1926–2001), American jazz musician
- Kenneth McDuff (1946–1998), American serial killer

Fictional characters:

- McDuff, the Talking Dog, a children's television character
- Suds McDuff, another name for The Simpsons' dog Santa's Little Helper
- Father Cyril McDuff, a priest in the television series Father Ted

== See also ==
- McDuff, a neighbourhood in East Wemyss, Fife, Scotland
- Gritty McDuff's Brewing Company, a brewery in Maine, USA
- McDuff Electronics, a defunct subsidiary of Tandy Corporation
- Macduff (disambiguation)
- Clan MacDuff
- Duff (disambiguation)
- Duff (surname)
- Dove (surname)
