= Bottomcraig =

Coordinates: 56.40°N 03.03°W

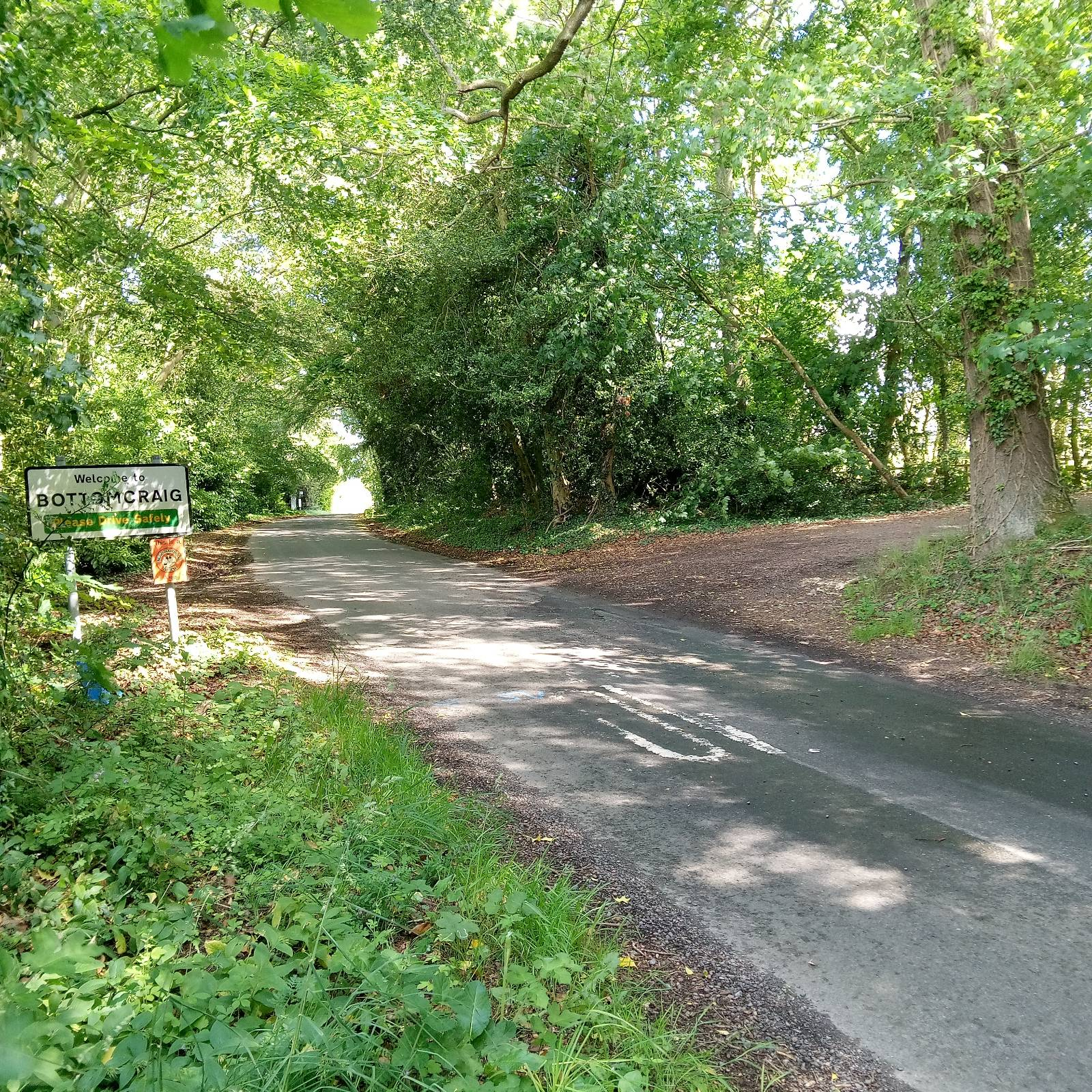
- The western entrance to Bottomcraig

- Location within Fife
- OS grid reference: NO3624
- Council area: Fife
- Country: Scotland
- Sovereign state: United Kingdom
- Police: Scotland
- Fire: Scottish
- Ambulance: Scottish

Bottomcraig is a village in Fife, Scotland located near Balmerino and The Gauldry.

The village is home to Balmerino Parish Church, built in 1811, and the former manse built in 1816. A school was built in the village in 1776 but relocated in 1830 to The Gauldry where it has remained since.

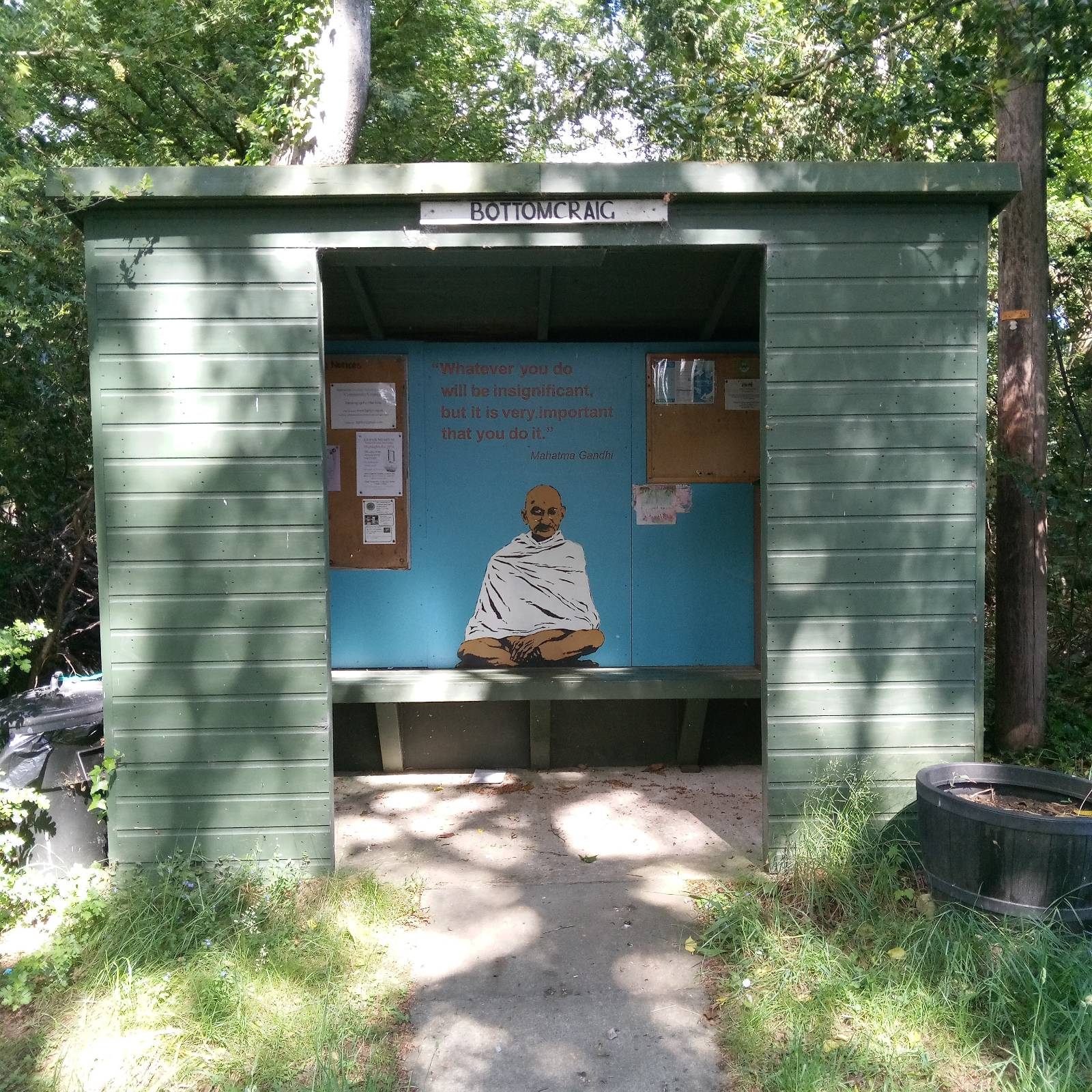
The green bus stop in Bottomcraig

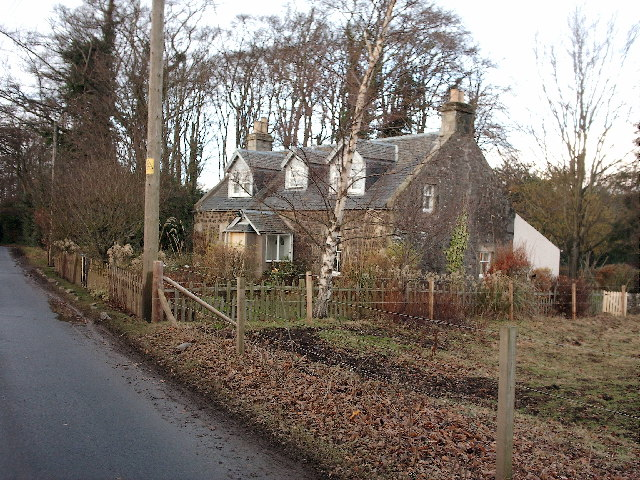
Bottomcraig
