= Skirmish of Arisaig =

1746 battle

- Part of the Jacobite rising of 1745
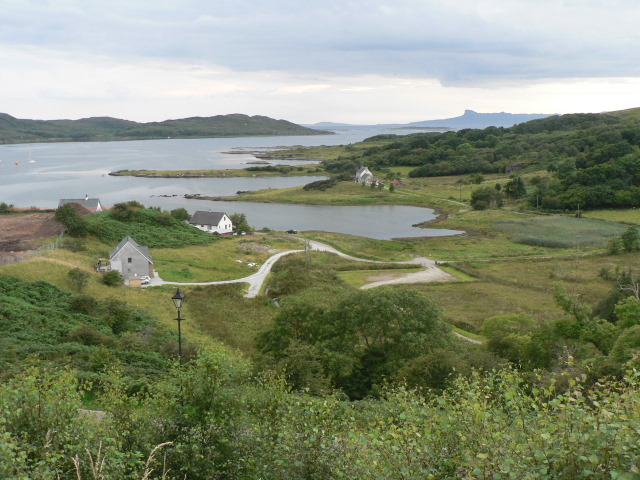
- Arisaig Bay
Date	17 May 1746
Location	Arisaig, Scottish Highlands
Result	Unknown

Belligerents
Jacobites	(Kingdom of Great Britain) Great Britain

Commanders and leaders
MacDonald of Borrodale	(Kingdom of Great Britain) Captain Robert Duff; Captain John Fergussone

The Skirmish of Arisaig took place on 16 May 1746 at Arisaig, Scotland and was the last armed conflict of the Jacobite rising of 1745. It was fought between a British Government force and Jacobites of the Clan Macdonald of Clanranald.

== Background ==
After the Jacobite defeat at the Battle of Culloden in April 1746, the Western Highlands of Scotland received attention from the British Royal Navy. Captain John Fergussone of the Royal Navy had sailed north in the bomb vessel HMS Furnace through the Sea of the Hebrides and The Minch, and had come under fire from the Jacobites in what is now known as the Skirmish of Loch Ailort on 9 May 1746.

On 16 May 1746, the British naval expedition acquired a new force when HMS Furnace was joined by another bomb vessel, HMS Terror. Fergussone then came under the command of Robert Duff who was the senior captain. The next day, 17 May, Duff and Fergussone launched a joint expedition against Morar. Their sailors landed on the western end of the beach and burnt the house of Alan MacDonald.

== Skirmish ==
After Morar, the vessels turned south, rounding the peninsula and arriving off Arisaig. As the boats approached MacDonald of Borrodale's men opened fire on them and also exploded three French gunpowder mines when the sailors reached the shore.

== Aftermath ==
In response Duff and Fergussone retaliated by burning all of the houses along the loch. On 27 May 1746, Furnace and Terror embarked with eighty regular troops from Fort William along with 120 men of the Campbell of Argyll Militia. On 28 May this combined force made its way to Strontian where Duff and Fergussone left the coastal settlement of Moidart in flames. On 30 May they anchored off the Isle of Eigg where Captain John MacLeod and forty men of the Jacobite Clan Ranald Regiment were lured by false promises to surrender only for thirty-eight of them to be confined on ship, some of whom died on voyage to the River Thames and the rest destined to become slaves in the West Indies. Fergussone then posted detachments around Loch Morar and on the night of the 4/5 June 1746 one of his parties captured the Jacobite Simon Fraser, 11th Lord Lovat, a major prize.

== See also ==
- Jacobite rising of 1745
- Battle of Culloden
- Skirmish of Loch nan Uamh
- Skirmish of Loch Ailort
