= Skirmish of Loch Ailort =

1746 battle

- Part of the Jacobite rising of 1745
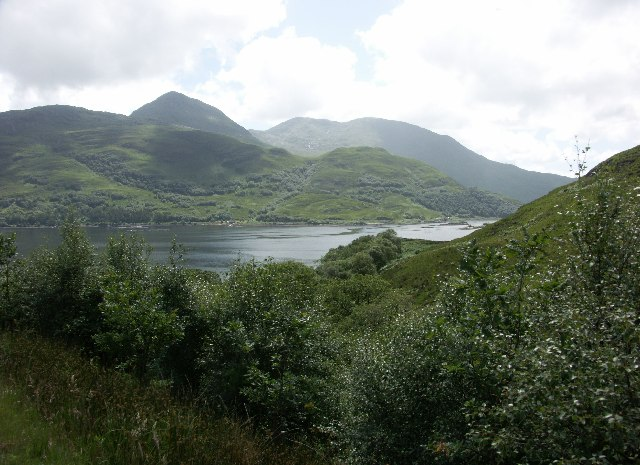
- Loch Ailort
Date	9 May 1746
Location	Loch Ailort, Scottish Highlands
Result	Unknown

Belligerents
(Kingdom of Great Britain) British-Hanoverians	Jacobites; Clan Macdonald of Clanranald

Commanders and leaders
(Kingdom of Great Britain)	Ranald MacDonald

Strength
	500 men

The Skirmish of Loch Ailort was a conflict that took place on 9 May 1746 at Loch Ailort, in the district of Moidart, Scottish Highlands and was part of the Jacobite rising of 1745.

On 9 May 1746, almost a month after the Jacobite defeat at the Battle of Culloden, a skirmish took place at Loch Ailort, Moidart between a group of Jacobites from the Clan Macdonald of Clanranald who were led by their chief, the Young Ranald MacDonald, against a British-Hanoverian Government force. It was one of the last armed conflicts of the Jacobite rising.

== Background ==
The Young Ranald MacDonald is supposed to have gone to France shortly after the Jacobite defeat at the Battle of Culloden in April 1746. However, it is clear that he secretly lingered in his own country for at least eighteen months after, mainly in the wilds of Moidart, which were apparently fraught with the greatest peril.

At this time the Western Highlands of Scotland were coming under the attention of the Royal Navy and also the Campbell of Argyll Militia who supported the Government. This attention was started by Captain John Fergusssone and the shore parties of his bomb vessel HMS Furnace. Furgussone first cruised the Sea of the Hebrides and The Minch and then worked his way north, taking prisoners at the Isle of Canna and the Isle of Barra. He then proceeded east and burnt everything of value on the Isle of Raasay.

== Skirmish ==
On May 9, Fergussone sailed up the mainland Loch Nevis and burnt the new house of MacDonald of Barisdale. On the same day when Fergussone searched the caves of Loch Ailort, he came under fire from 500 men who were under the command of Young Clanranald. The Young Clanranald was almost the last armed representative of the Jacobite cause, and had also been one of the first.

== See also ==
- Jacobite risings
- Jacobite rising of 1745
- Battle of Culloden
- Skirmish of Loch nan Uamh
