= Alexander MacDuff =

Scottish lawyer

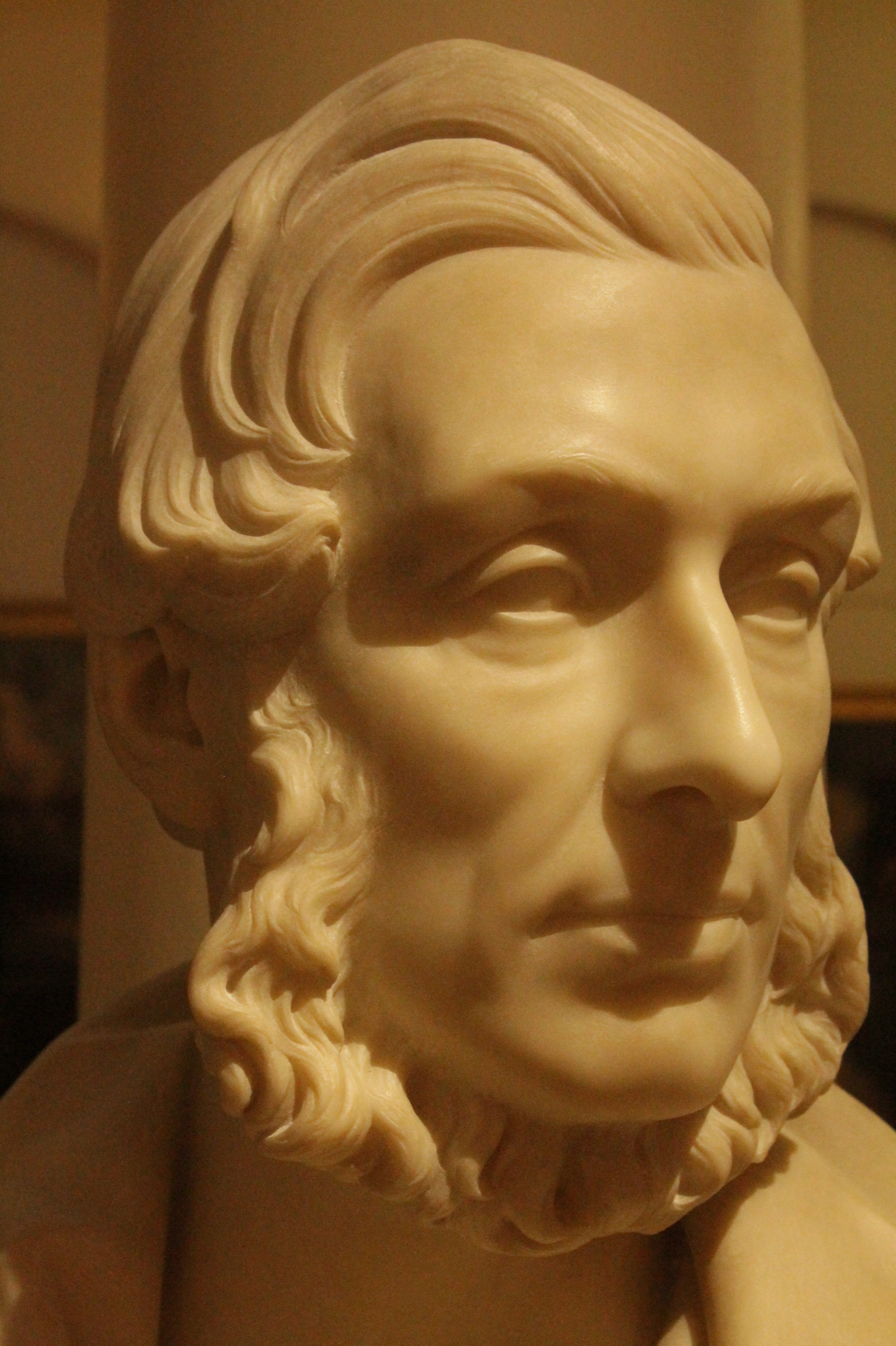
Alexander MacDuff of Bonhard by William Brodie, 1868, Perth Museum

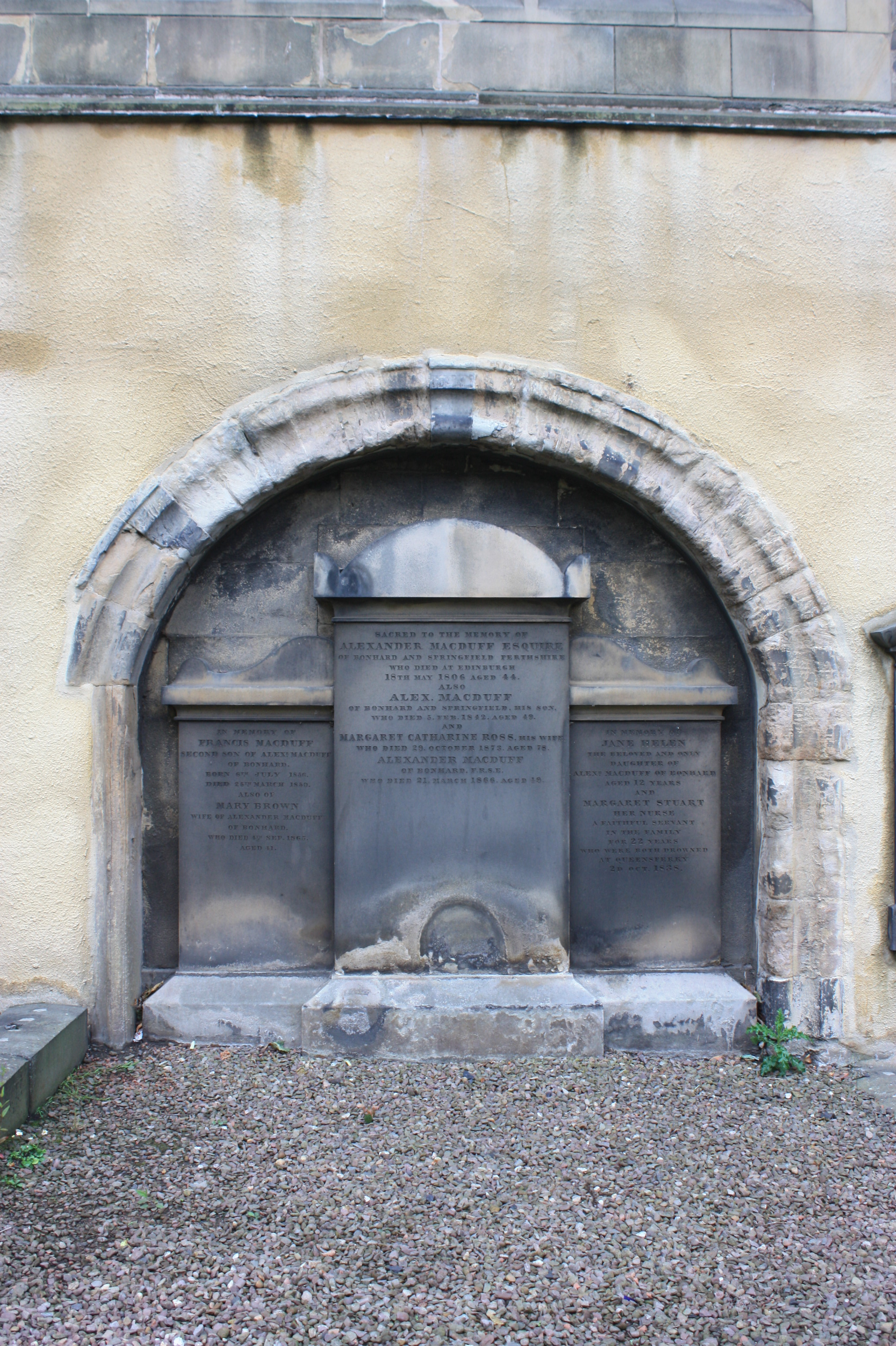
The grave of Alexander MacDuff, Greyfriars Kirkyard, Edinburgh

Alexander MacDuff of Bonhard WS FRSE (5 December 1816 – 21 March 1866) was a Scottish lawyer, landowner and agriculturalist.

== Life ==
He was born on the family estate at Springfield in the parish of Scone near Perth on 5 December 1816, the son of Margaret Catherine Ross (1795–1873) and her husband, Capt Alexander Macduff, 3rd of Bonhard (1792–1842). His father was a Captain in the Royal Perthshire Militia, and his mother was the youngest daughter of John Ross of Balgersho, and sister of Major General Sir John Ross of the Rifle Brigade. Alexander was educated at Perth Grammar School, Perth Academy, the High School of Edinburgh and the University of Edinburgh. He was then apprenticed to David Welsh WS, a solicitor based at 7 Northumberland Street in Edinburgh's New Town. He studied law at the University of Edinburgh. He was admitted as a WS in 1839. He then took over his previous employer's office at 7 Northumberland Street. His house was at 7 Regent Terrace on Calton Hill on the east of the city.

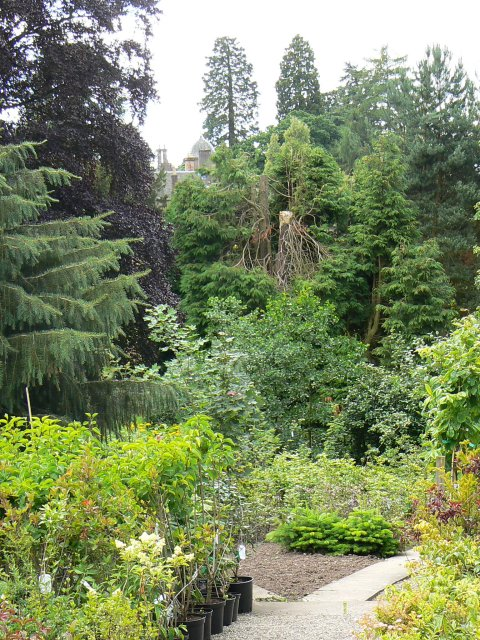
Bonhard House Gardens

Following his father's death, he inherited the family estate, Bonhard, which lies near Scone, Perthshire. He practiced law, became deputy chairman of the Scottish Central Railway and was involved in charitable and public service in Edinburgh and Perthshire. He was an elder in the Church of Scotland, and a lay member of the General Assembly. He had a number of addresses in Edinburgh over the course of his life, including in Forth Street, at 55 Melville Street in the West End of Edinburgh, and he died at 13 Eton Terrace there. He built a new house on Bonhard Estate between 1845 and 1847, instructing either William Burn or David Bryce as architect. Burn's sister was married to John Macvicar, a cousin of Alexander's mother. The former family home on the estate, Springfield, was occupied by Alexander's brothers and his widowed mother. Eventually it was sold to the Gray family, who rebuilt the house and renamed Springfield, Balcraig.

In 1859 he was appointed as secretary to the Royal Commission on Roads and Bridges, looking at road improvements and the abandoning of toll roads. In 1865 he became Secretary of the Royal Highland and Agricultural Society. In 1866 he was elected a Fellow of the Royal Society of Edinburgh his proposer being John Hutton Balfour. He was a talented geologist, a collector of plants and trees (many examples of which still adorn the gardens at Bonhard), and a rare species of south Atlantic sea worm was named in his honour.

He died on 21 March 1866 and is buried with his family in Greyfriars Kirkyard in central Edinburgh. The grave lies against the east gable of the church, facing the main entrance.

His family estate of Bonhard, north-east of Perth, is still a private home. The current owners occasionally open the gardens for charity.

== Family ==
On 21 September 1842 he married Mary Brown (1824–1865), only child of Francis Brown of Jordanhill, Trinidad. They had two daughters and one son; Elizabeth, Alexander and Jane Helen. Alexander (1849–1936) succeeded his father and was the last Macduff laird of Bonhard.

He had five brothers, the Rev Dr John Ross Macduff (1818–1895), a well-known minister and religious writer, Thomas Macduff (1820–1890), a merchant in London and Montreal, Hector Colin Robert Macduff-Duncan of Damside, a merchant in Manchester, Shanghai and Bombay and a landowner, William Macduff ARSA, (1824–1881), an artist, and Rev Robert Charles Henry Macduff (1829–1891), a minister. His sister, Jane Helen (1826–1838), was drowned in an accident at South Queensferry, along with the family nurse, Margaret Stuart.
