= Naughton, Fife =

Locality in Fife, Scotland

Naughton (Note: Also known previously as Nachtane) is a locality, estate and former Scottish barony, in the parish of Balmerino, 4 miles (6.4 km) southwest of Newport-on-Tay in Fife, Scotland.

== History ==
Naughton was held by the Hay family in the 13th century. The estate passed by marriage to the Crichton family in the 15th century and sold in the 18th century to the Morisons.

The ruins of Naughton Castle are located behind Naughton House.
