= Balmerino Parish Church =

Parish church in Scotland

Coordinates: 56°24′32″N 3°01′29″W

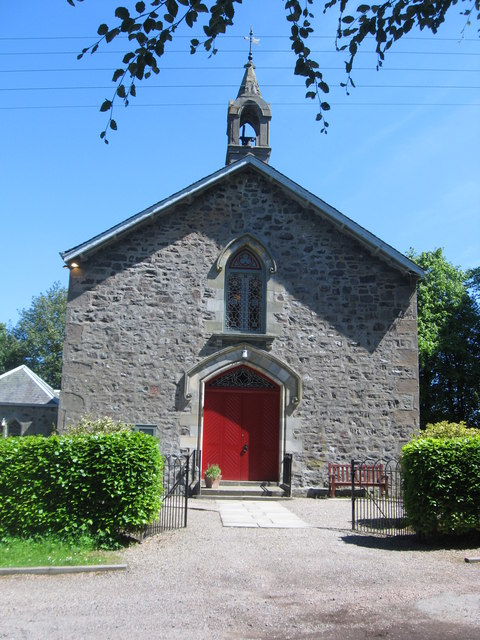
Front view of Balmerino Parish Church, west side.

Balmerino Parish Church is a Church of Scotland parish church in Bottomcraig, Fife, Scotland. The church sits in the centre of the small village where it was built in 1811. It is situated across the road from the accompanying manse constructed in 1816.

== History ==
Before the construction of the church, numerous churches were used in the parish. The immediate predecessor was a church constructed in Kirkton around the beginning of the 17th century: according to one source in 1595 and in 1611 according to another. This church was used by the parishioners until the construction of the current church in 1811.

During the construction of the church, the parishioners attended the church in Kilmany where services were alternated weekly between the two ministers. Thomas Chalmers, minister of Kilmany, preached one week and Andrew Thompson, minister of Balmerino, preached the other.

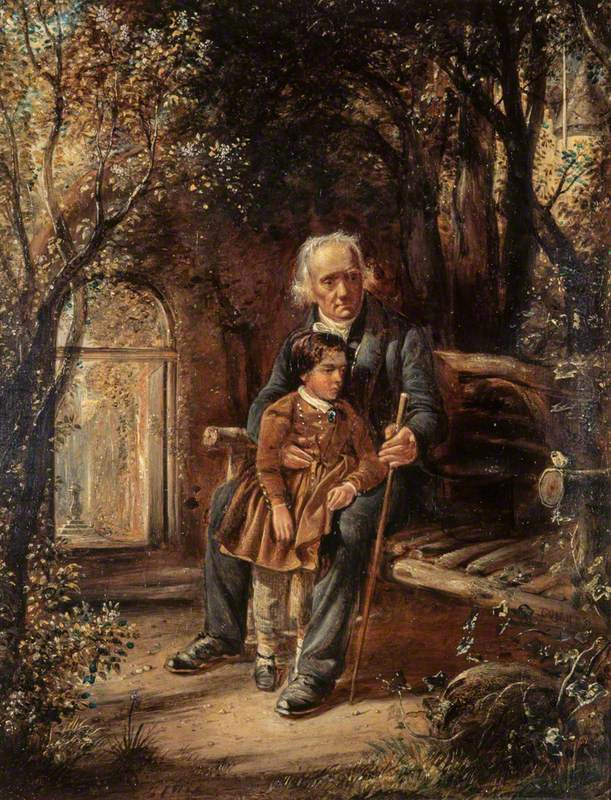
Rev. Thomas Chalmers (back), who was minister of Kilmany in his late twenties and early thirties, gave services to Balmerino parish during the new parish church's construction. Here he is painted in his later years with his grandson Thomas (front).

=== Construction and original layout ===
The church was constructed in 1811 with a capacity of 400 people. The ground it was built on was then a moor. Larch trees were planted around it.

The original layout differed greatly from the present layout. The pulpit was built in the middle of the south wall. In front of the pulpit sat the communion table which spanned nearly the full length of the church. The gallery, the front of which was a half oval, spanned the full length of the church.

On the south wall of the church sat two doors: one on the east end and one on the west end. Above these doors were windows.

Opposite the two south doors were doors on the north wall, both of which led upstairs to the gallery. The gallery was lit by the windows above the south doors as well as two square-headed windows on each gable, on the east and west of the church.

A belfry was added above the church on the west side. The bell was operable from the path at this end of the church.

=== Opening ===
The church was opened on 17 November 1811 by Dr George Campbell, the minister of Cupar. The first Psalm sung in his service was Psalm 122. He proceeded to read Luke 8:18.

=== Construction of manse ===
In 1816 a manse was constructed to the west of the church on the other side of the road on what was then a gravel pit. The ground it was built on required soil to be carried from the former manse to the new one for its construction. The site was chosen by reverends Andrew Thomson and Thomas Chalmers.

=== Renovation ===
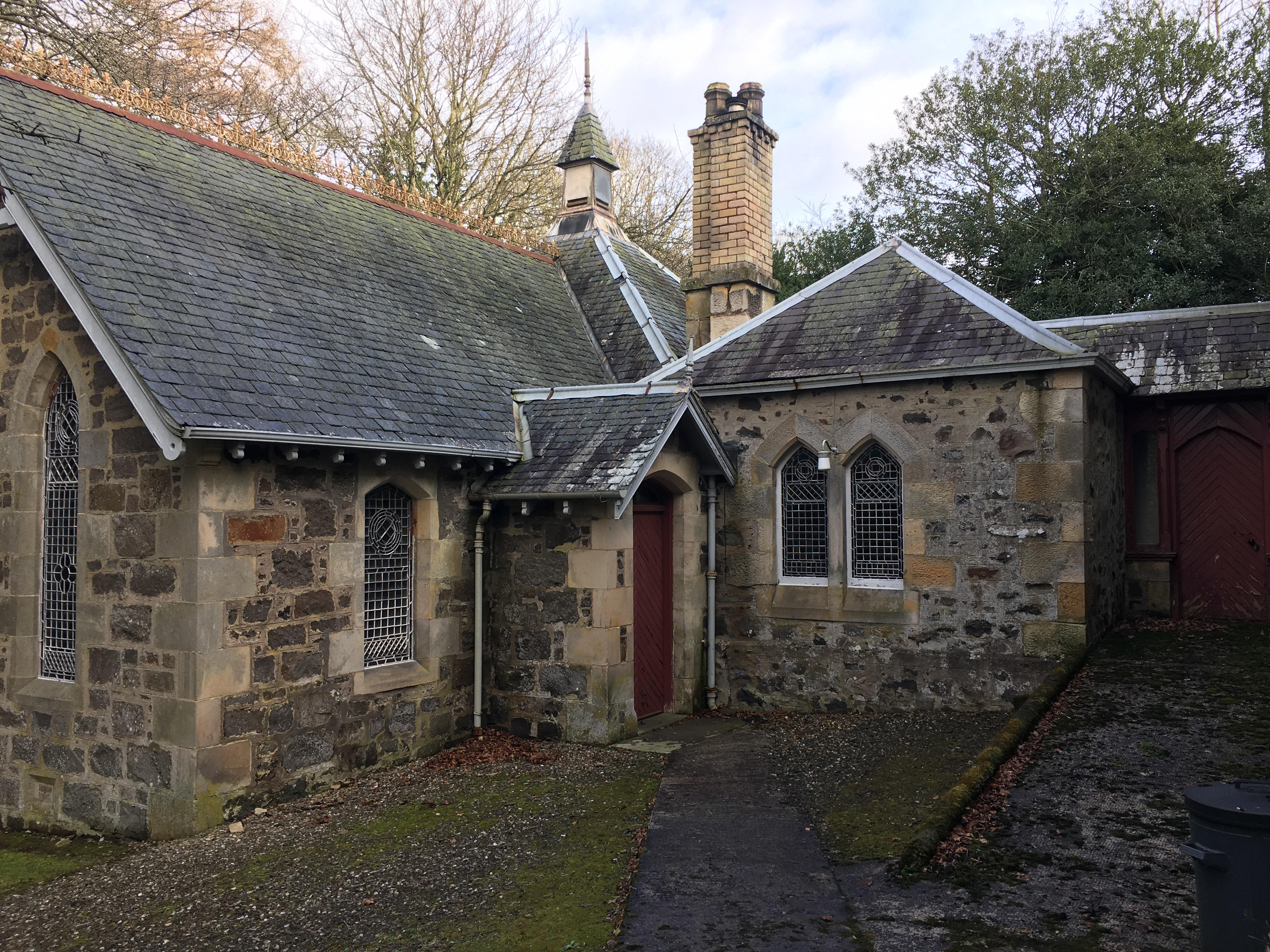
The vestry on the north face of the church.

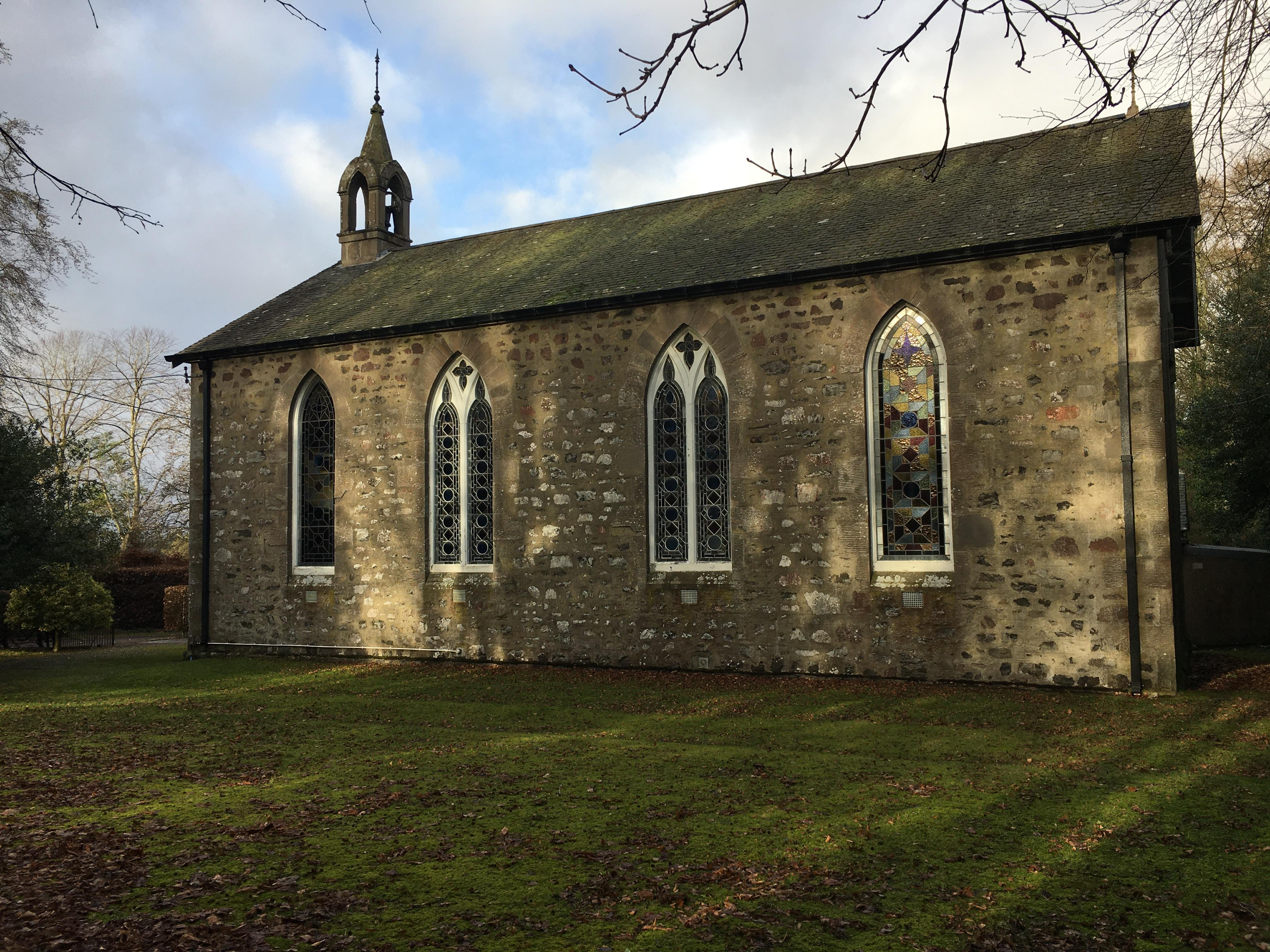
The south face of the church.

In 1883 and 1884, the architects C. & L. Ower renovated the church, changing the layout drastically.

The gallery was removed and replaced by one in the west end so that a new pulpit could be placed in the east end. The new pulpit, of "handsome design", was built with panels on each side containing text. Behind the pulpit, to each side, two new mosaic windows were built on the east wall.

On the platform in front of the pulpit a communion table, a font, and an extravagantly designed chair were placed. With the pulpit now on the east end opposite the entrance, the pews were each made to sit in rows perpendicular to the north and south walls facing eastwards. The pew area was made to extend from the west end to the communion table.

Two passages were added between the pews, leading from the entrance to the pulpit. The bell in the belfry, which was previously operable only from the outside, could now be rung from a chamber in the wall above the door at the entrance.

The square-headed window in the east gable was replaced with a round window made of "ornate tinted glass in geometrical patterns". The other windows were replaced with tinted cathedral glass with tracery added to the front ones on the west gable.

Construction of the vestry now present in the church was also started at this time when a session house was added to the north face of the church. In 1887 a hall with a capacity of 210 people was subsequently added to the north of the original vestry for use as a Sunday school.

In 1883, upon the church's reopening, the church's choir was formed.

=== Unification with Gauldry church ===
In 1937, the church merged with the church in nearby Gauldry which had, prior to this, belonged to the United Free Church of Scotland.

Services alternated weekly between the two churches until the Gauldry church's closure in 2019. Since then, services have been held solely at Balmerino.

== Ministers of Balmerino Parish ==
=== List of ministers of Balmerino parish ===
	Name	Admitted	Notes
1	Archibald Keith	1560	
2	Patrick Auchinleck	Unknown	Mentioned 1571 to 1576
3	Thomas Douglas	Unknown	Mentioned 1578
4	Walter Greig	1621	
5	Andrew Bruce	1673	
6	James Gairns	1676	
7	George Hay	1678	
8	John Auchterlony	1682	
9	Andrew Bowie	1690	
10	James Hay	1696	
11	Thomas Kerr	1722	
12	Thomas Stark	1742	
13	John Stark	1773	
14	Andrew Thomson	1782	
15	John Thomson	1824	
16	James A. Campbell	10 December 1857	
17	John T. Arnott	December 1907	
18	Peter Campbell Millar	September 1920	
19	William J. McFarland	1926	Died 25 June 1937 aged 56
	R. P. Constable	31 March 1938	

=== Andrew Thomson ===
Andrew Thomson was the author of the first statistical account of Balmerino in the famous Statistical Account of Scotland, a work published by Sir John Sinclair of Ulbster documenting the parishes of Scotland in the 1790s.

=== John Thomson ===
John Thomson was the fifteenth minister of Balmerino, succeeding his father Andrew Thomson. John Thomson authored the second statistical account of Balmerino in the New Statistical Account of Scotland, an updated account published by the General Assembly of the Church of Scotland in the period of 1834 to 1845. He served as minister for 32 years until his death on 22 May 1857 at the age of 60.

=== James A. Campbell ===
James A. Campbell succeeded John Thomson in 1857 as the sixteenth minister of Balmerino parish. Prior to this, he had served as chaplain to the Highland Brigade during the Crimean War.

Much of the history of Balmerino parish was collected in his 1867 book Balmerino And Its Abbey: A Parochial History. The book, which was updated with a newer edition published in 1899, is the most complete historical work to cover the parish's history.

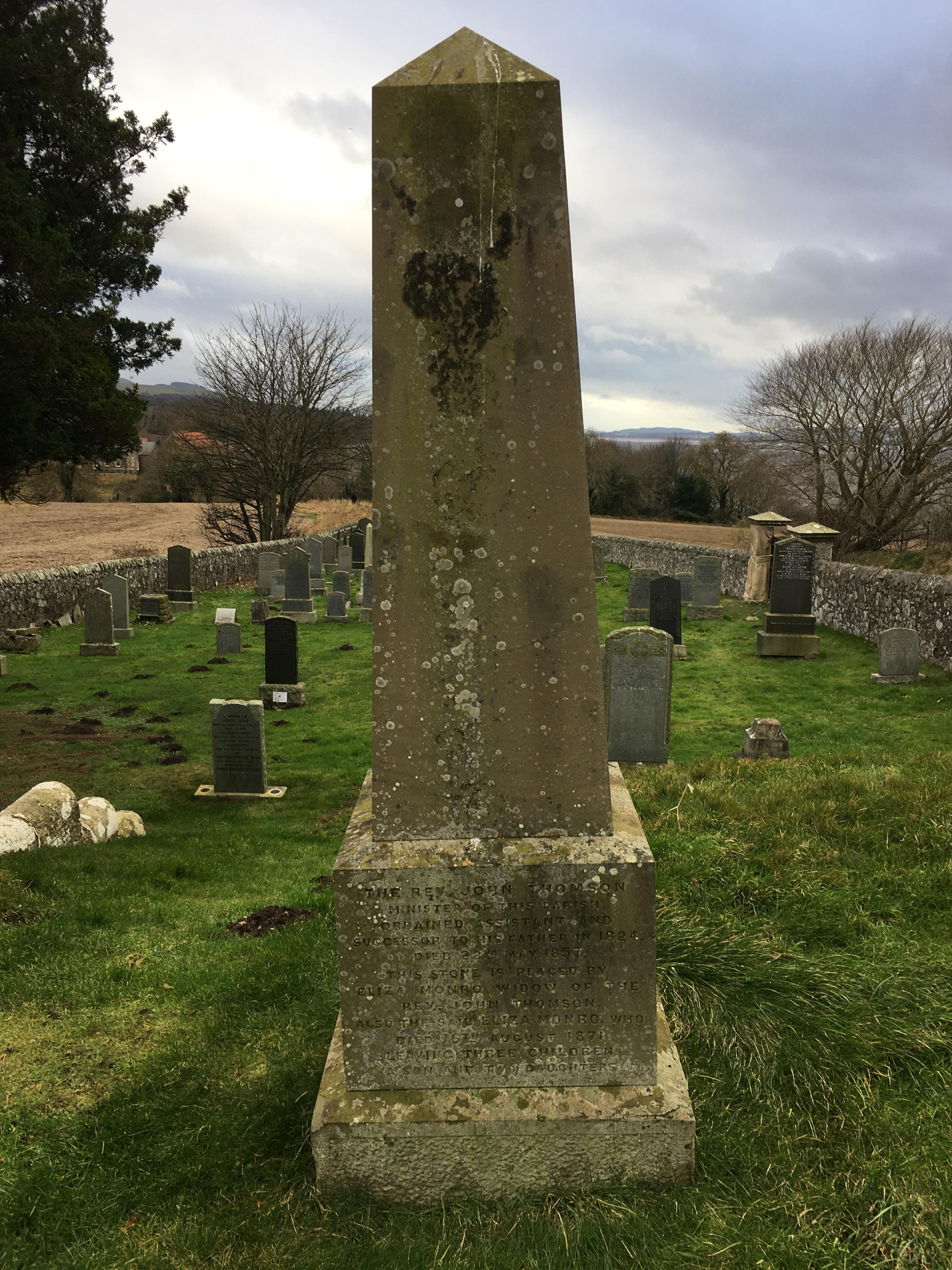
The tombstone of John Thomson, located in Balmerino cemetery.

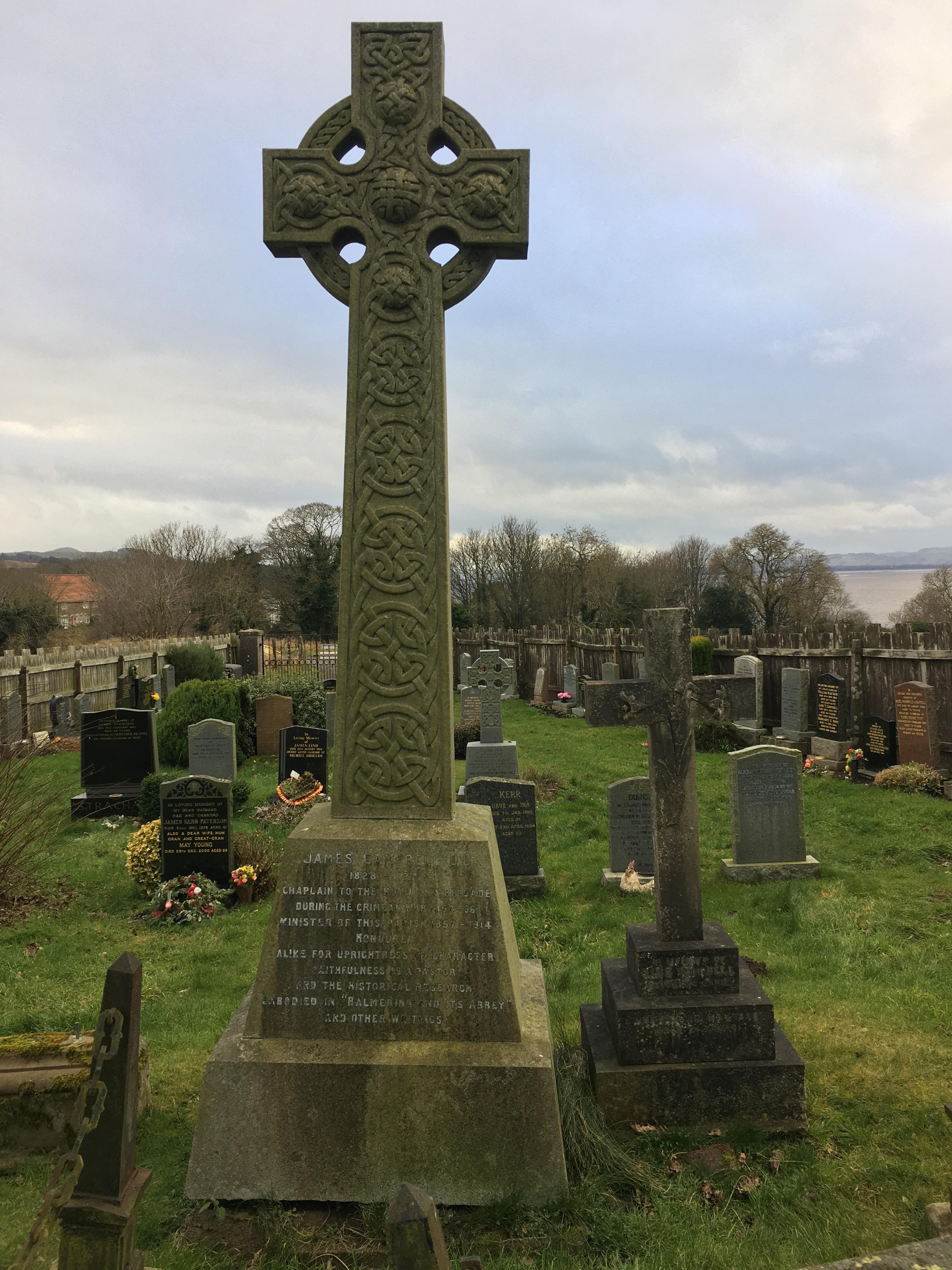
The tombstones of James Campbell (left) and his wife Jane (right), located in Balmerino cemetery.

== See also ==
- Thomas Chalmers
- Gauldry Church
