= MacDuff's Cross =

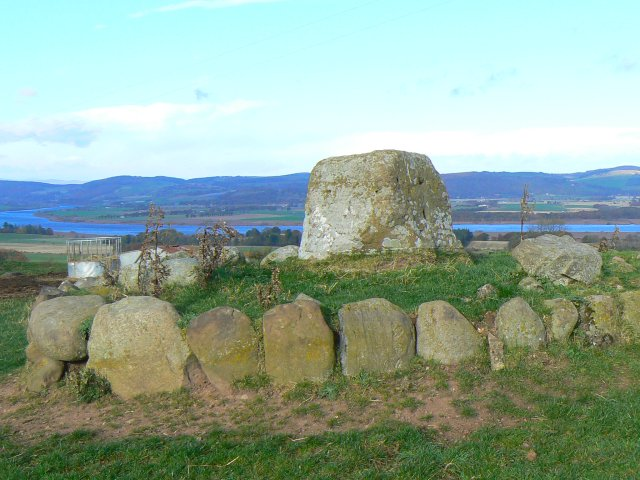

- Macduff's Cross shown within Fife
- 56°20′14″N 3°15′06″W
- Location: Fife, Scotland

MacDuff's Cross, also known as the Cross of MacDuff or Ninewells, is the remains of an ancient white sandstone monument, located on a historic site between Lindores and Newburgh in Fife, Scotland. Robert Sibbald suggested the date of its construction to have been 1059 CE, however earlier dates have been considered.

== Description ==
It is located beside a minor road west of Black Cairn Hill, around 1 mile (1.6 km) southwest of Newburgh, where only the pedestal remains of what once was supposedly a cross. The stone is 3.75 feet (1.14 m) high, 4.55 feet (1.39 m) in length and 3.75 feet (1.14 m) wide. There are various indents on the monument, suggested to have originally been nine cup and ring marks. Other crosses exist in Mortlach, Aberdeenshire; Kiels, Inverary; Strathlacplan, Argyll; and on Iona, Islay and Oronsay.

== Law of Clan MacDuff ==
The cross is supposed to mark the spot where the clan Macduff, in return for its chief's services against Macbeth, was granted rights of sanctuary and composition for murder done in hot blood. This legend suggests a penalty of nine cows and a heifer for such a crime. Shortly after the death of Macbeth, King of Scotland, Malcolm III of Scotland was also supposed to have bestowed on the Thane of Fife the privilege of ordaining the King, and leading the charge in battle. The cross was originally dedicated to Saint Magider and smashed to pieces by a mob of fanatical followers of John Knox in 1559. It was a place where William Ballingall suggested "arch-criminals claimed the protection of the Law of Clan Macduff".

== Inscription ==
MacDuff's cross was said to have been marked with a "metrical inscription, in a strange half-Latin jargon, the varying copies of which, still preserved, have given much occupation to antiquaries". After studying two early translations, Walter Wood suggested that it read "An altar for those whom law pursues, a hall for those whom strife pursues, being without a home. Who makest thy way hither, to thee this paction becomes a harbour. But there is hope of peace only when the murder has been committed by those born of my grandson. I set free the accused, a fine of a thousand drachms from his lands. On account of Macgridin and of this offering, take once for all the cleansing of my heirs beneath this stone filled with water."

== See also ==
- Macduff's Castle
