= MacDuff v JCI =

South African legal case

MacDuff & Co Ltd (in Liquidation) v Johannesburg Consolidated Investment Co Ltd is the leading case in South African contract law on the issue of fictional fulfilment of suspensive conditions.

== Facts ==
The case involved two companies: Johannesburg Consolidated Investment (JCI) was a minority shareholder in Macduff & Co. JCI had entered into a contract with Macduff whereby the latter would undergo voluntary liquidation. Macduff agreed that, once liquidated, it would transfer all its assets into a newly founded company under the auspices and supervision of JCI. In the agreement was a suspensive condition which permitted liquidation only if the shareholders of Macduff agreed to it.

At the time of contracting, this was a promising deal for JCI. When market conditions changed, however, it was no longer of much economic benefit. JCI accordingly bought up shares in Macduff, until it was the majority shareholder, and then voted against liquidation, deliberately obstructing the possibility of the occurrence of the suspensive condition in the contract.

== Judgment ==
The Appellate Division ruled that such obstruction was unlawful, and therefore that there was fictional fulfillment of the suspensive condition. JCI was thus held liable for breach of contract.

== See also ==
- Contract
- Law of South Africa
- South African contract law
