= East Wemyss =

Village in Fife, Scotland

Coordinates: 56.161°N 3.064°W

East Wemyss: Scottish Gaelic: Uaimheis an Ear
- Location within Fife
- Population: 1,930 (2020)
- OS grid reference: NT 340 970
- Council area: Fife
- Lieutenancy area: Fife
- Country: Scotland
- Sovereign state: United Kingdom
- Post town: KIRKCALDY
- Postcode district: KY1
- Dialling code: 01592
- Police: Scotland
- Fire: Scottish
- Ambulance: Scottish
- UK Parliament: Glenrothes
- Scottish Parliament: Kirkcaldy

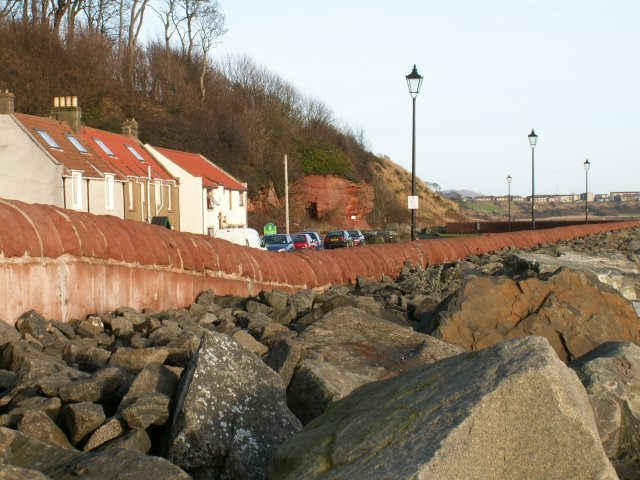
Sea wall and coast defences at East Wemyss

East Wemyss (/wiːmz/) is a village situated on the south coast of Fife, Scotland. According to the 2011 census, the village has a population of 1,928.

== History ==
East Wemyss was traditionally one of several coal mining communities along the south coast of Fife. The pit was its main employer for many years until it was closed in 1967 due to a fire which resulted in the deaths of nine men. The mine has since been demolished, however a memorial to the pit and the men who died has been erected.

This coastal area is known for its caves (the place-name derives from Gaelic uamh, 'cave'); there are eleven caves, several of which contain Pictish incised carvings. The caves were documented by the archaeological television programme Time Team in 2005, in an episode then broadcast in February 2005. The excavations uncovered evidence of prehistoric, Middle Iron Age, Pictish, Medieval and post-medieval activity, including a new Pictish carving. In April 2010, the caves became the subject of a short film, which can be viewed on the Fife Council website.

East Wemyss used to be a good spot for fishing although the construction of a sea wall has mainly stopped shore fishing. There are, however, still boat huts which many people use to fish the Firth of Forth. East Wemyss is also home to the ruins of MacDuff's Castle, home to the MacDuff Earls of Fife, the most powerful family in Fife during the Middle Ages. The town's most notable son is Jimmy Shand (1908–2000), the bandleader. It is the fictional home village of Val McDermid's character Allie Burns.

== See also ==
- List of places in Fife
