= John Ross Macduff =

Scottish religious writer

John Ross Macduff (23 May 1818 – 30 April 1895) was a Scottish divine and a prolific author of religious essays. He published many practical and devotional works which attained a wide circulation.

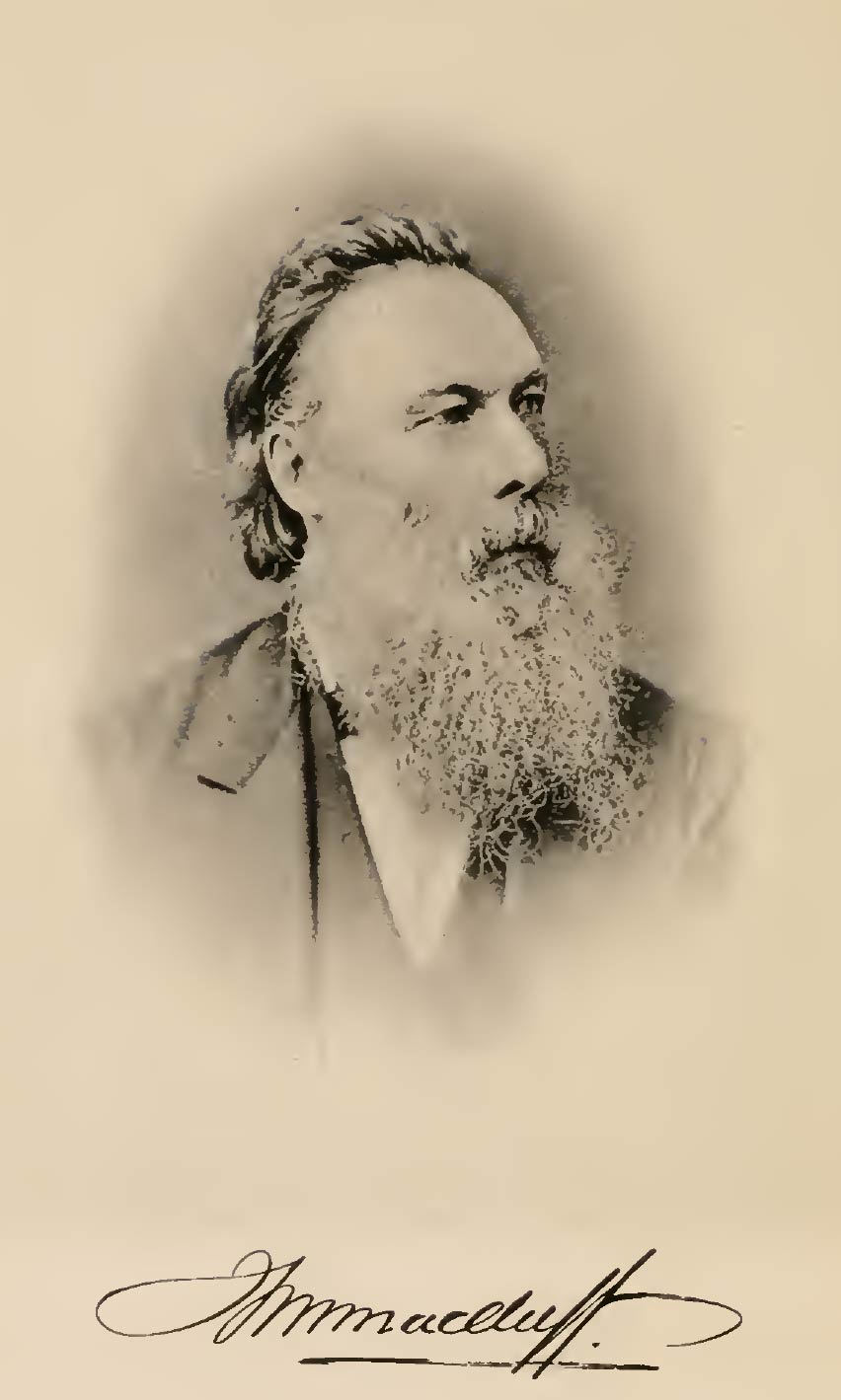
Portrait of John Ross Macduff

Born on his father's estate of Bonhard, Scone, Perthshire, Macduff was the second of the six sons of Captain Alexander Macduff of Bonhard and Springfield and Margaret Catherine Ross, youngest daughter of John Ross of Balgersho. Macduff was educated at the High School of Edinburgh and the University of Edinburgh, and was ordained as minister of Kettins, a parish in Forfarshire close to his maternal grandfather's estate, in 1843. He was transmitted to St Madoes, a parish in Perthshire centred around the Pitfour estate owned by his mother's cousin, Sir John Stewart-Richardson, in 1849.

He left St Madoes to take charge of Sandyford, a new church in the affluent west end of Glasgow in 1855. He was married in 1844 to Anne Joan Seton, who died in 1846, and in 1849 to Louisa Stephen, who died in 1888. By Anne Seton, he had a son, Alexander Ross Macduff (1845–1857) and by Louisa Stephen he had a daughter, Anne Seton Macduff (1850–1929), who edited his later works, including his autobiography, "The Author of Morning and Night Watches".

He preached at Sandyford for fifteen years (until 1870), and then went to live in Chislehurst, Kent, in order to focus entirely on writing. His best-known books were "The Prophet of Fire", "Memories of Bethany", "Memories of Gennesaret", "The Shepherd and His Flock", "Sunset on the Hebrew Mountains", "Comfort Ye", "The Golden Gospel", "Morning and Night Watches", "The Bow in the Cloud", "The Story of a Dewdrop", and "The Story of a Shell."

In 1857, whilst in Glasgow, he was appointed by the General Assembly a member of their Hymnal Committee. His 31 hymns appeared in his Altar Stones, 1853, and were also included with his later poems in his The Gates of Praise, 1876. His hymn, "Christ is Coming, let Creation" is still included in the Church of Scotland's Church Hymnary 4.

Macduff died at his home, Ravensbrook, Chislehurst in 1895.

== Works ==
- Evening Incense (1856)
- The Mind of Jesus (1860)
- The Words of Jesus (1854)
- The Footsteps of St Paul (1855)
- The Faithful Promiser (1858)
- Memories of Bethany (1861)
- Memories of Olivet (1868)
- Memories of Patmos; or, Some of the Great Words and Visions of the Apocalypse (1871)
- In Christo, or The Monogram of St. Paul (1880)
- The Story of a Dewdrop (1881)
- Christ in the Covenant (1885)
- The Story of Jesus in Verse. Leading Incidents in the Great Biography (1893)
- The Little Child's Book of Divinity or Grandmamma's Stories about Bible Doctrines
- The Cities of Refuge: or, The Name of Jesus, A Sunday book for the young
- The Hart and the Water-Brooks; a practical exposition of the forty-second psalm.
- The Pathway of Promise
