= HMS Furnace =

Four ships of the Royal Navy have borne the name HMS Furnace:

- HMS Furnace (1695) was a 4-gun bomb vessel launched in 1695 and broken up in 1725.
- HMS Furnace (1740) was a 14-gun bomb vessel launched in 1740 and sold in 1763.
- HMS Furnace (1779) was an 8-gun fireship launched in 1779 and sold in 1783.
- HMS Furnace (1797) was a 12-gun gunvessel launched in 1797 and sold in 1802.
