= Macduff's Castle =

Castle in Fife, Scotland

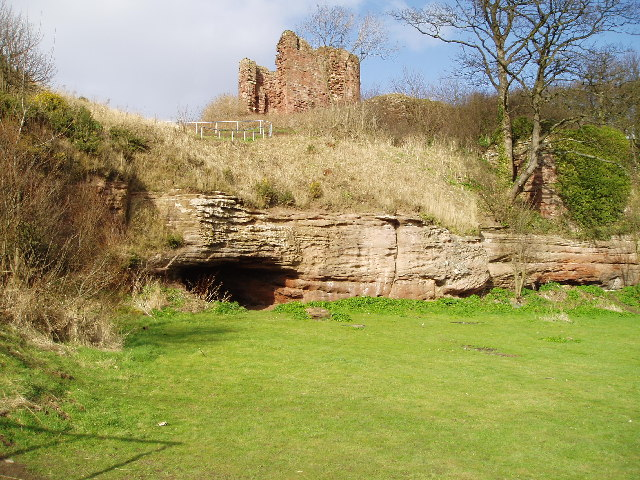
- Macduff's Castle and the Wemyss Caves
- Interactive map of Macduff's Castle
- 56.16266°N 3.05786°W
- Type: Castle
- Location: East Wemyss, Fife

Site notes
- Material: Stone
- Condition: Ruined

Scheduled monument
- Official name: Wemyss Caves, East Wemyss
- Designated: 30 August 1937
- Reference no.: SM817

MacDuff's Castle is a ruined castle near East Wemyss, in Fife, Scotland. The site is associated with the MacDuff Earls of Fife, the most powerful family in Fife in the Middle Ages, although nothing survives from this period. The present ruins are the remains of the home of the Wemyss family, who lived here from the 14th century, and their successors in the 16th century.

== History ==
It is thought that a castle may have been built here by the MacDuff Mormaers, or Earls, of Fife in the 11th century, at the time of King Macbeth of Scotland (d. 1057). The Wemyss family, descendants of the MacDuffs, owned the property from the 14th century, and built the earliest part of the present castle. Edward I of England paid a visit here in 1304, staying with Sir Michael Wemyss. However, Wemyss later joined forces with Robert the Bruce, and Edward ordered the castle to be destroyed.

After the Wemyss family moved to nearby Wemyss Castle, it passed to the Livingstones, and then in 1530 it was taken over by the Colvilles who built a second tower to the south-west, and enclosed a courtyard with a gatehouse. In 1637 the castle was bought by Sir John Wemyss of West Wemyss, from Lord Colville of Culross, and in 1651 the lands of East and West Wemyss were united as a single barony.

== Description ==
The ruins formerly comprised the remains of a four-storey 14th-century tower, and a five-storey 16th-century tower. The two were connected by a 16th-century gatehouse range, with 17th-century walls containing gun loops. However the eastern tower was demolished by Fife County Council in 1967 after a child was injured falling from it. The castle is a Scheduled Ancient Monument. A 16th-century dovecote formerly stood at the edge of the shore to the south of the castle, but was destroyed by sea erosion in the 1970s. The castle remains the property of the Wemyss Estate.

== Ghostlore ==
Local ghostlore states that the castle is supposedly haunted by a "Grey Lady", said to be a Mary Sibbald who was found guilty of theft and died in the castle.

== Images ==
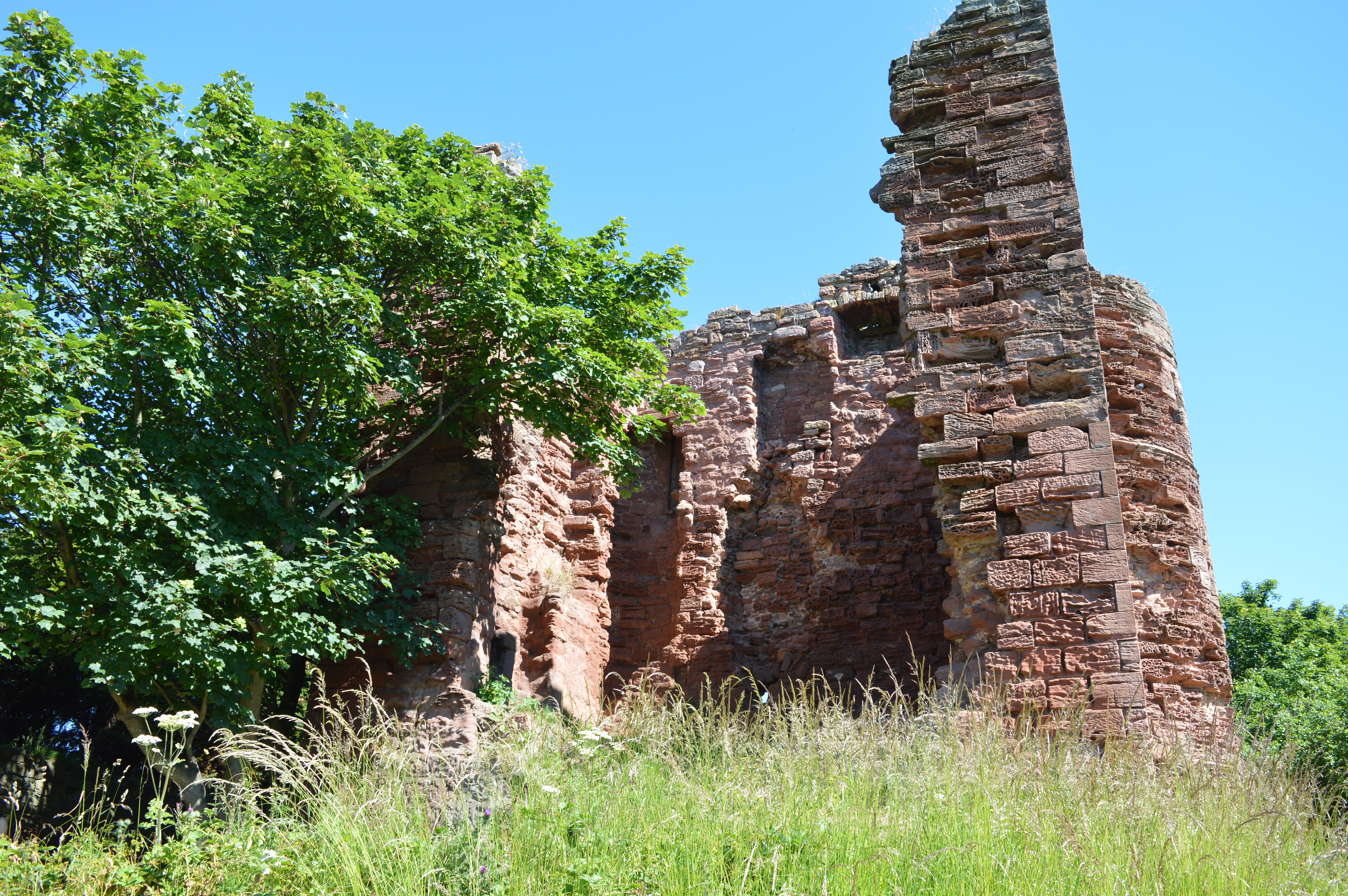

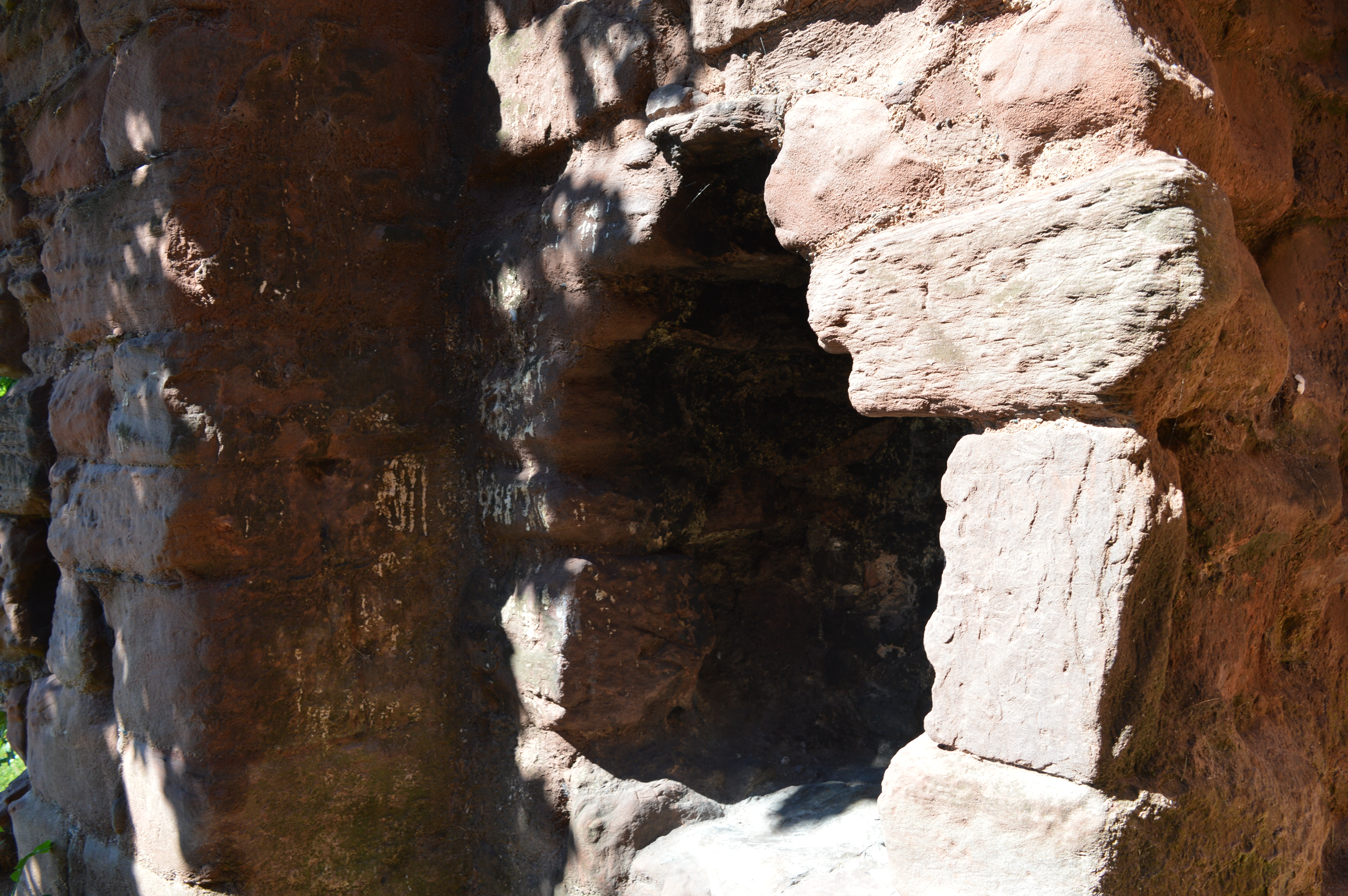

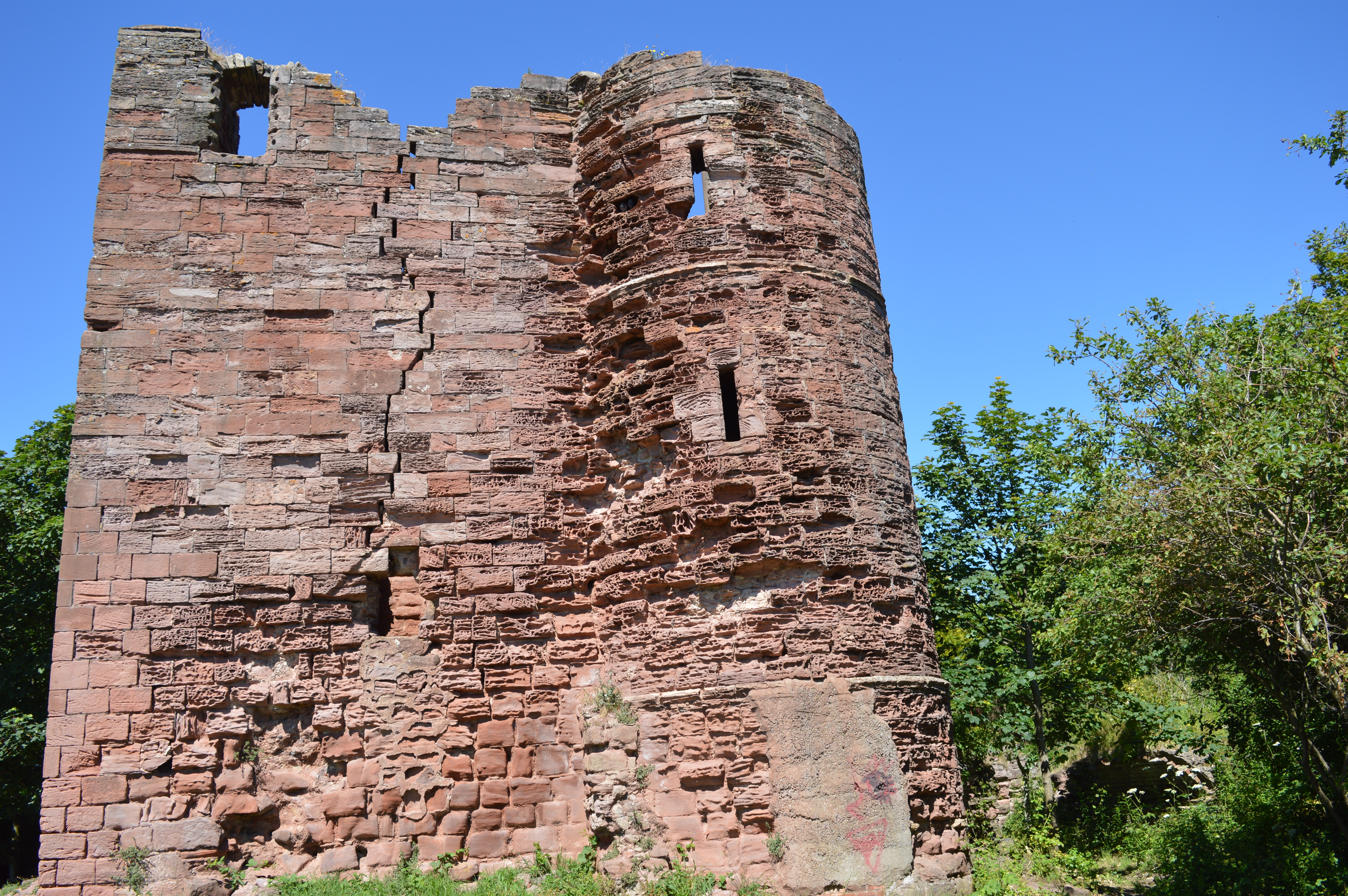

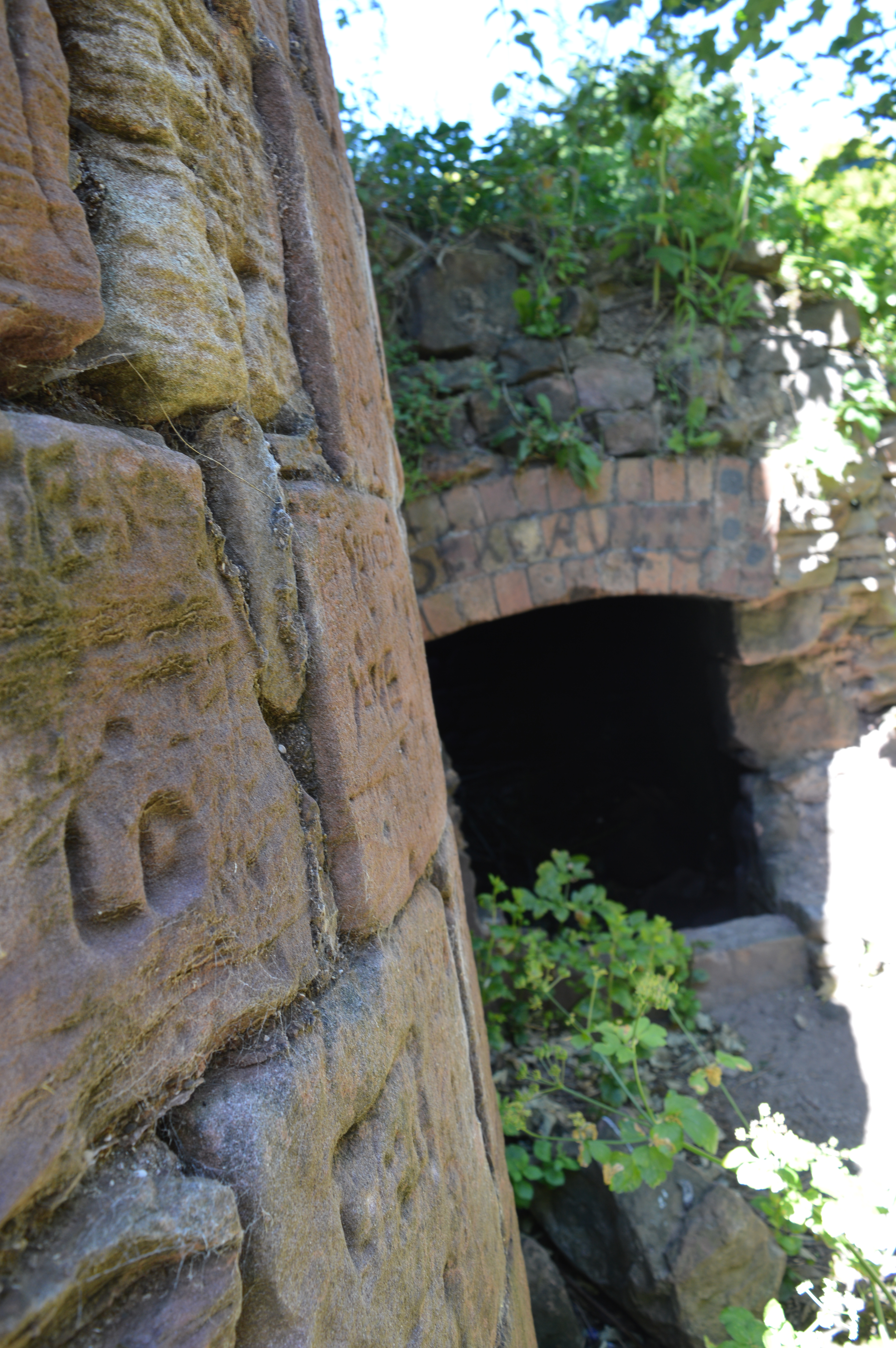

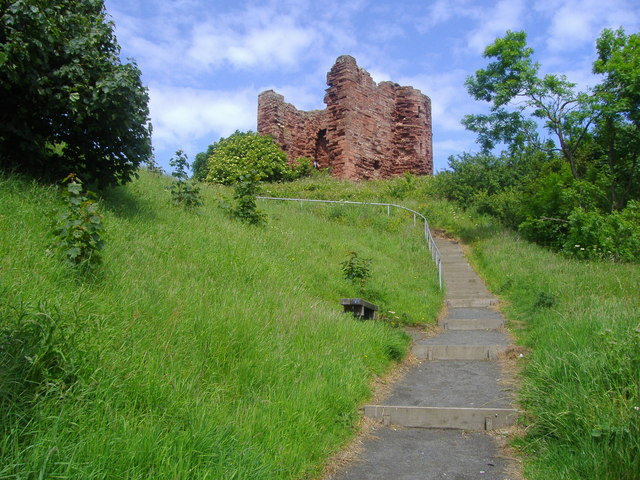

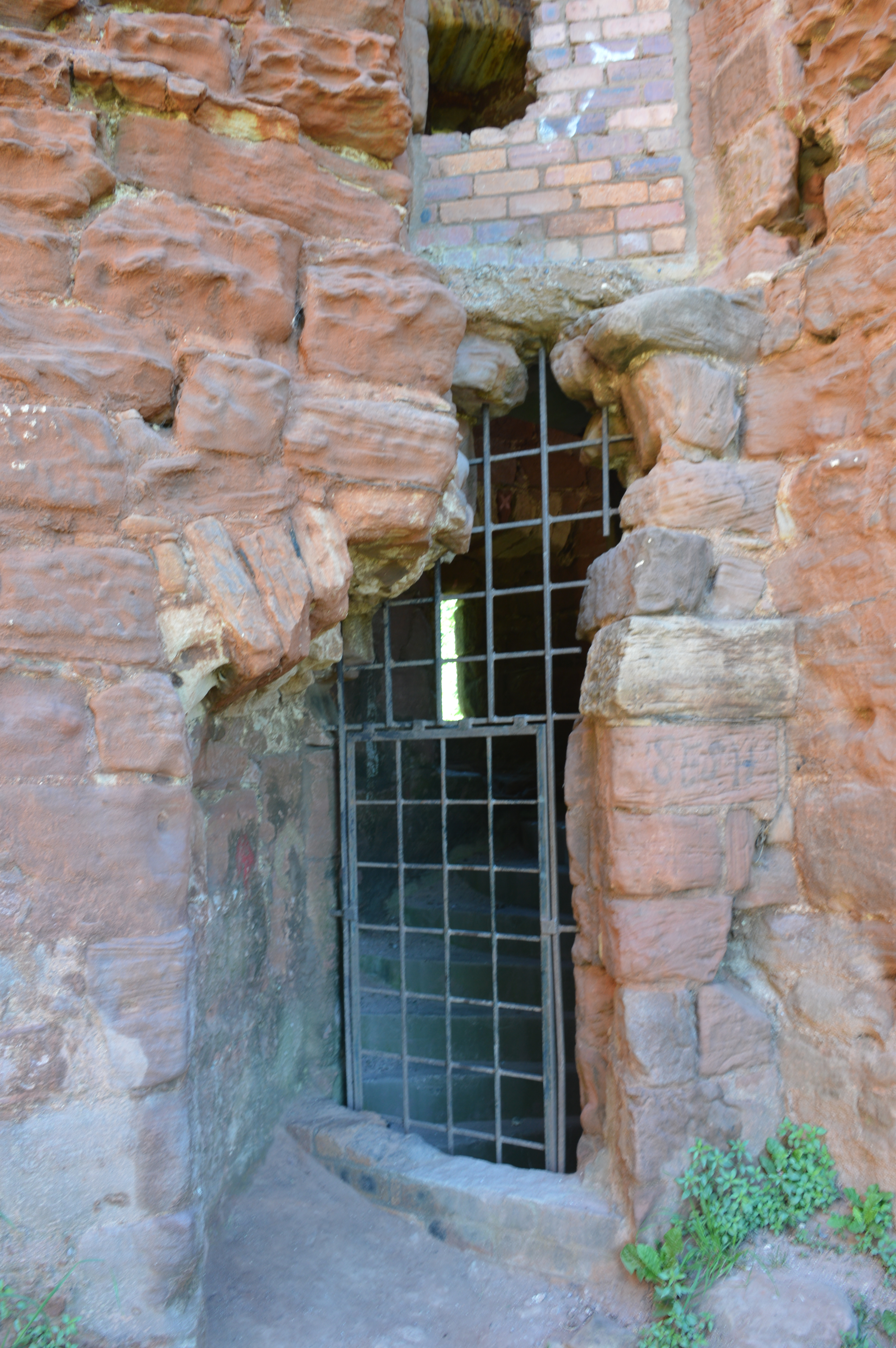

== See also ==
- Scheduled monuments in Fife
