= Clan MacDuff =

Lowland Scottish clan

- MacDhuibh
- Motto: Deus juvat (God assists)

Profile
- Plant badge: Red whortleberry (lingonberry), or boxwood
- Pipe music: MacDuff's Lament
- Clan MacDuff no longer has a chief, and is an armigerous clan
- Historic seat: Macduff's Castle
- Last Chief: Alexander William George Duff of Braco, 1st Duke of Fife
- Died: 29 January 1912
Septs of Clan MacDuff
Duff, Fife, Fyfe, Clan Kilgour (Kilgore), Meek, Spence, Spens, Wemyss.

Clan MacDuff or Clan Duff is a Lowland Scottish clan. The clan does not currently have a chief and is therefore considered an armigerous clan, which is registered with the Lyon Court. The early chiefs of Clan MacDuff were the original Earls of Fife, although this title went to the Stewarts of Albany in the late fourteenth century. The title returned to the MacDuff chief when William Duff was made Earl Fife in 1759. His descendant Alexander Duff was made Duke of Fife in 1889.

== History ==
=== Origins of the clan ===
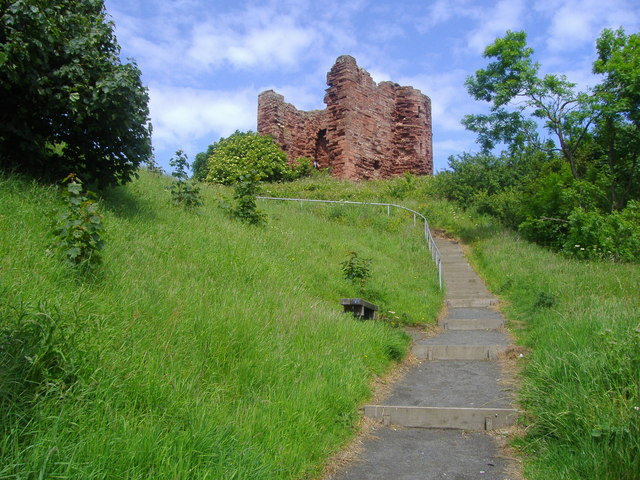
Macduff's Castle, in Fife, Scotland. The site is associated with the MacDuff Earls of Fife

The Clan Duff claims descent from the original royal Scoto-Pictish line of which Queen Gruoch of Scotland, wife of Macbeth, King of Scotland, was the senior representative. After the death of MacBeth, Malcolm III of Scotland seized the Crown and his son, Aedh, married the daughter of Queen Gruoch. Aedh was created Earl of Fife and abbot of Abernethy. The early chiefs of Clan MacDuff were the Earls of Fife. Sir Iain Moncreiffe wrote that the Clan MacDuff was the premier clan among the Scottish Gaels. Today, the Earls of Wemyss are thought to be the descendants in the male line of Gille Míchéil, Earl of Fife, thought to be one of the first Clan MacDuff chiefs. Gille-michael MacDuff was one of the witnesses to the great charter of David I of Scotland to Dunfermline Abbey.

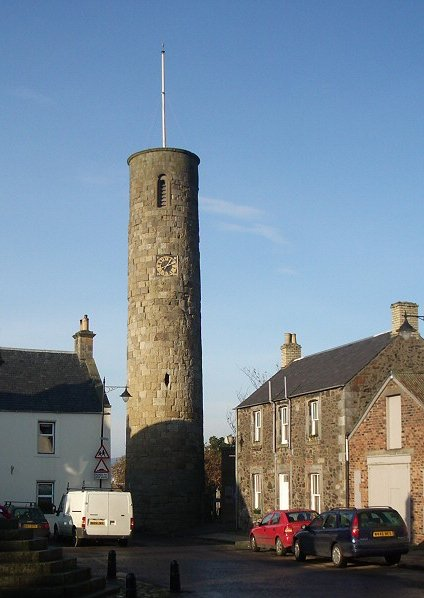
The round tower of Abernethy, built for the Celtic abbey of which a branch of Clan MacDuff were hereditary Abbots.

=== 14th and 15th centuries ===
In 1306 during the Wars of Scottish Independence, Duncan MacDuff, Earl of Fife, was as a minor, held by Edward I of England at the coronation of Robert the Bruce as his ward while Duncan's sister, Isabella MacDuff, placed the golden circlet upon King Robert's head. As a result, when she fell into the hands of King Edward's army, she was imprisoned in a cage which was suspended from the walls of Berwick Castle. Duncan MacDuff later married Mary, the niece of King Edward, and threw in his lot against the Bruce. However, he was captured and imprisoned in Kildrummy Castle where he died in 1336. The Earldom later fell into the hands of Robert Stewart, Duke of Albany, however, although the MacDuff family lost their rank, they continued to prosper. In 1384, the earl of Fife was described as capitalis legis de Clenmcduffe, meaning 'chief of the law of Clan MacDuff'. In 1404, David Duff received a charter from Robert III of Scotland for lands in Banffshire.

=== 17th, 18th and 19th centuries ===
In 1626, John Duff sold the lands in Banffshire which his ancestor had acquired in 1404. The title of The Fife returned with William Duff, 1st Earl Fife and Viscount Macduff, in 1759. The 1st Earl Fife's cousin, Captain Robert Duff of the Royal Navy supported the British-Hanoverian Government during the Jacobite rising of 1745 and was involved in the Skirmish of Arisaig. James Duff, 4th Earl Fife fought with distinction in the Peninsular War where he was wounded at the Battle of Talavera in 1809 and was later made a Knight of the Order of St Ferdinand of Spain.

Alexander Duff, 6th Earl Fife, married Louise, Princess Royal, eldest daughter of Edward VII. Alexander was advanced to the rank of Duke of Fife in July 1889.

=== 20th and 21st centuries ===
With the death of the 1st Duke of Fife, the Clan MacDuff had its last Chief.

== Law of Clan MacDuff ==
Clan Macduff was the first Scottish clan to be recognized as a clan by the Scottish Parliament, by legislation dated November 1384.

The Earl of Fife and the Abbot of Abernethy were both "Capitals of Law of the Clan MacDuff". The law protected all murderers within ninth degree of kin to the Earl of Fife, as they could claim sanctuary at the Cross of MacDuff near Abernethy, and could find remission by paying compensation to the victim's family.

The chiefs of the clan had the right to enthrone the King on the Stone of Scone. When the Stone of Scone was taken to England by Edward I of England, Robert I of Scotland had himself crowned King of Scots a second time, in order to be crowned by a member of clan MacDuff, in that case the Earl of Fife's sister.

In 1425, the last Earl of Fife, Murdoch Stewart, Duke of Albany, was beheaded. The Clan MacDuff's hereditary right of bearing the Crown of Scotland then passed to the Lord Abernethy. The current Lord Abernethy, who is consequently bearer of the Scottish Crown, is Alexander Douglas-Hamilton, 16th Duke of Hamilton.

== Tartans ==
There are several Clan MacDuff tartans. The most conventionally used is one recorded by the weavers William Wilson & Son of Bannockburn some time between c. 1780s and 1819 (two variants exist, with blue or green thin "tram track" over-check lines in place of the black ones.) A variant on this, with the larger black stripe replaced by dark green and the proportions altered, was recorded by the Highland Society of London, c. 1815–20. All of these are very similar to the royal Stewart tartan, but without its thin yellow and white over-checks. A third and rather different one appeared in 1842 in the Vestiarium Scoticum, and was probably invented by the "Sobieski Stuarts". There are various other tartans with names like dress MacDuff and hunting MacDuff.

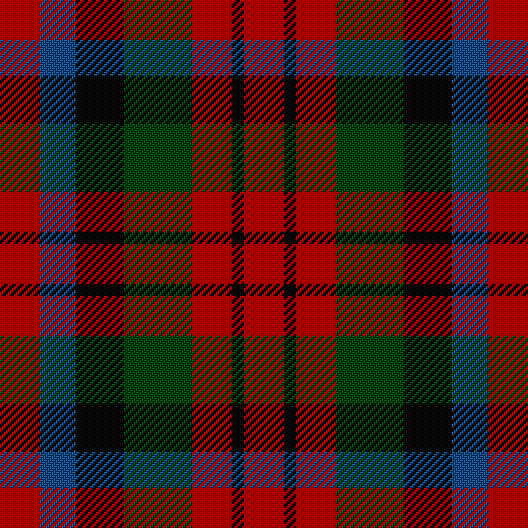
The most conventional of the Clan MacDuff tartans (main Wilsons' pattern)

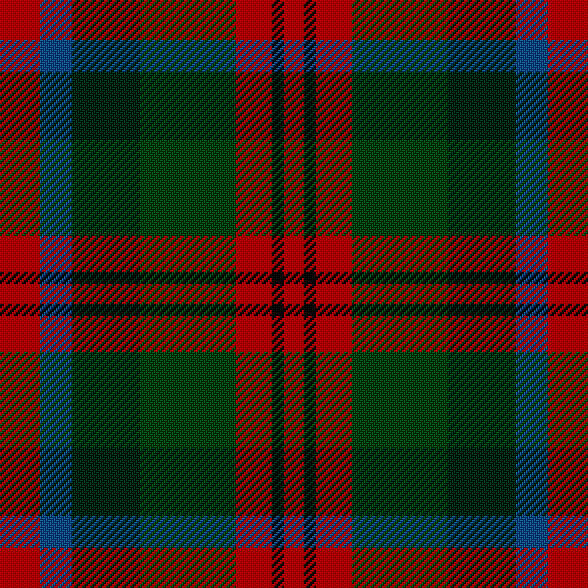
Highland Society version

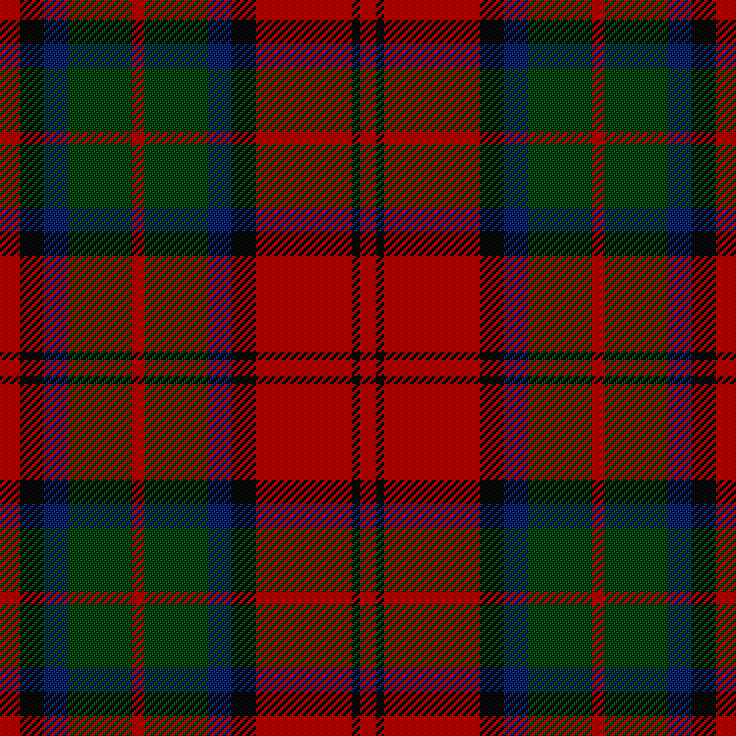
"Clan Makduffe" tartan as published in the Vestiarium Scoticum

== Clan Castles ==
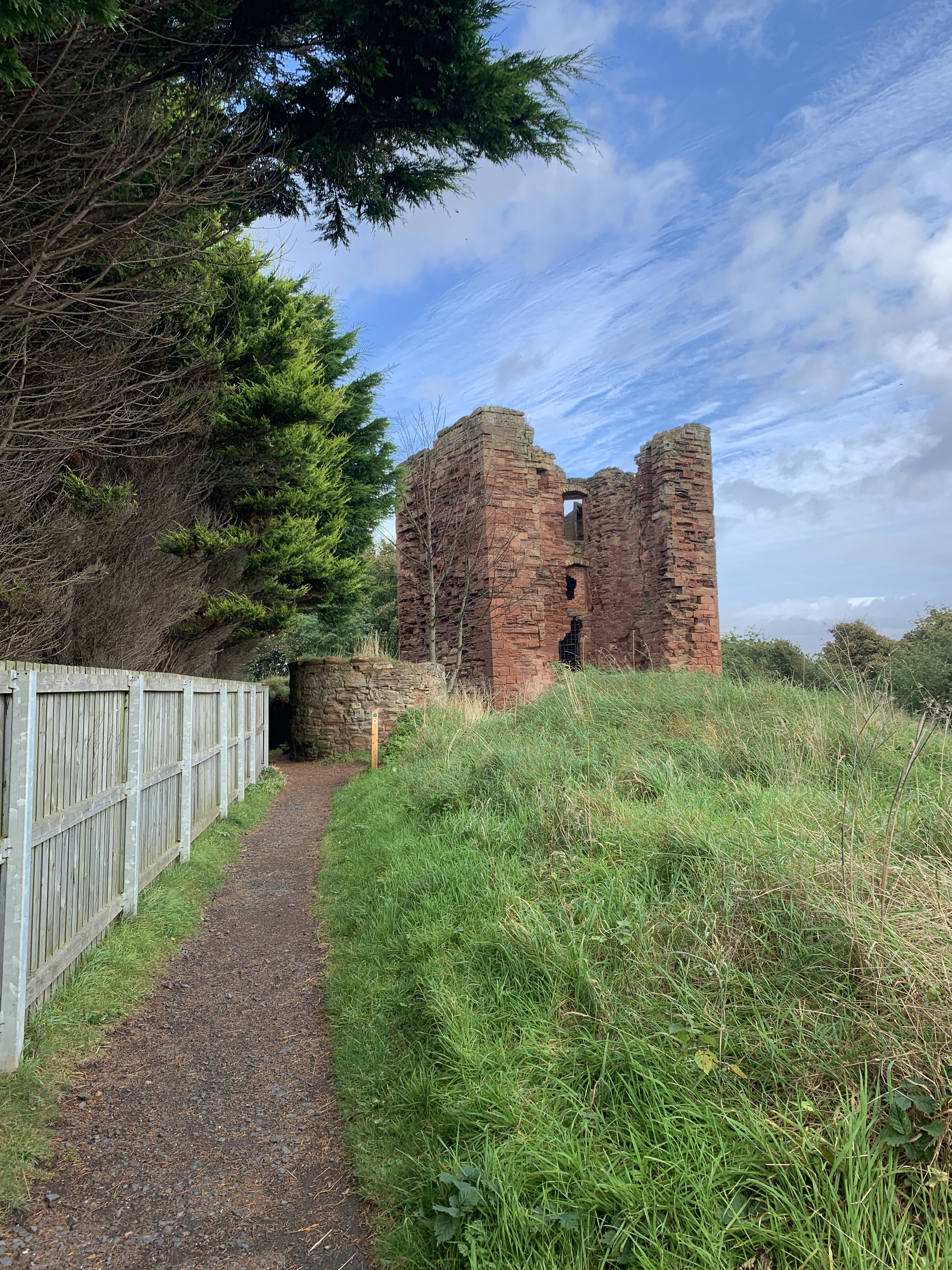
Updated picture of Clan MacDuff Castle (2019)

- Macduff's Castle in East Wemyss, Fife, is now a ruinous castle that was once held by the MacDuff Earls of Fife. The property later went to the Clan Wemyss who built the present castle.
- Airdit House in Leuchers, Fife, was originally held by the MacDuffs but later went to the Clan Stewart who held it in 1425 when Murdoch Stewart, Duke of Albany (also then Earl and Duke of Fife), was executed.
- Barnslee Castle near Markinch, Fife, was held by the Clan MacDuff. One story is that a tunnel led from it to Maiden Castle (see below), that was about three miles away.
- Castle Hill in North Berwick in East Lothian was probably held by the MacDuff Earls of Fife who had a ferry from North Berwick to Earlsferry in Fife.
- Cupar Castle in Cupar, Fife, was held by the Clan MacDuff.
- Falkland Palace in Falkland, Fife. There was a castle here that was held by the MacDuff Earls of Fife although it was destroyed by the English in 1337. It was re-built in 1371 and passed to Robert Stewart, Duke of Albany, who was then also Earl of Fife.
- Fernie Castle in Cupar, Fife, was once held by the MacDuff Earls of Fife.
- Maiden Castle near Methil, Fife, was once held by the Clan MacDuff. One story is that a tunnel led from it to Barnslee Castle (see above), that was about three miles away.

== See also ==
- Earl Fife
- Earl of Fife
- Duke of Fife
- Barony of MacDuff
