= Balmerino =

Town in Scotland

Coordinates: 56.411°N 03.043°W

Balmerino: Scottish Gaelic: Baile Meireanach
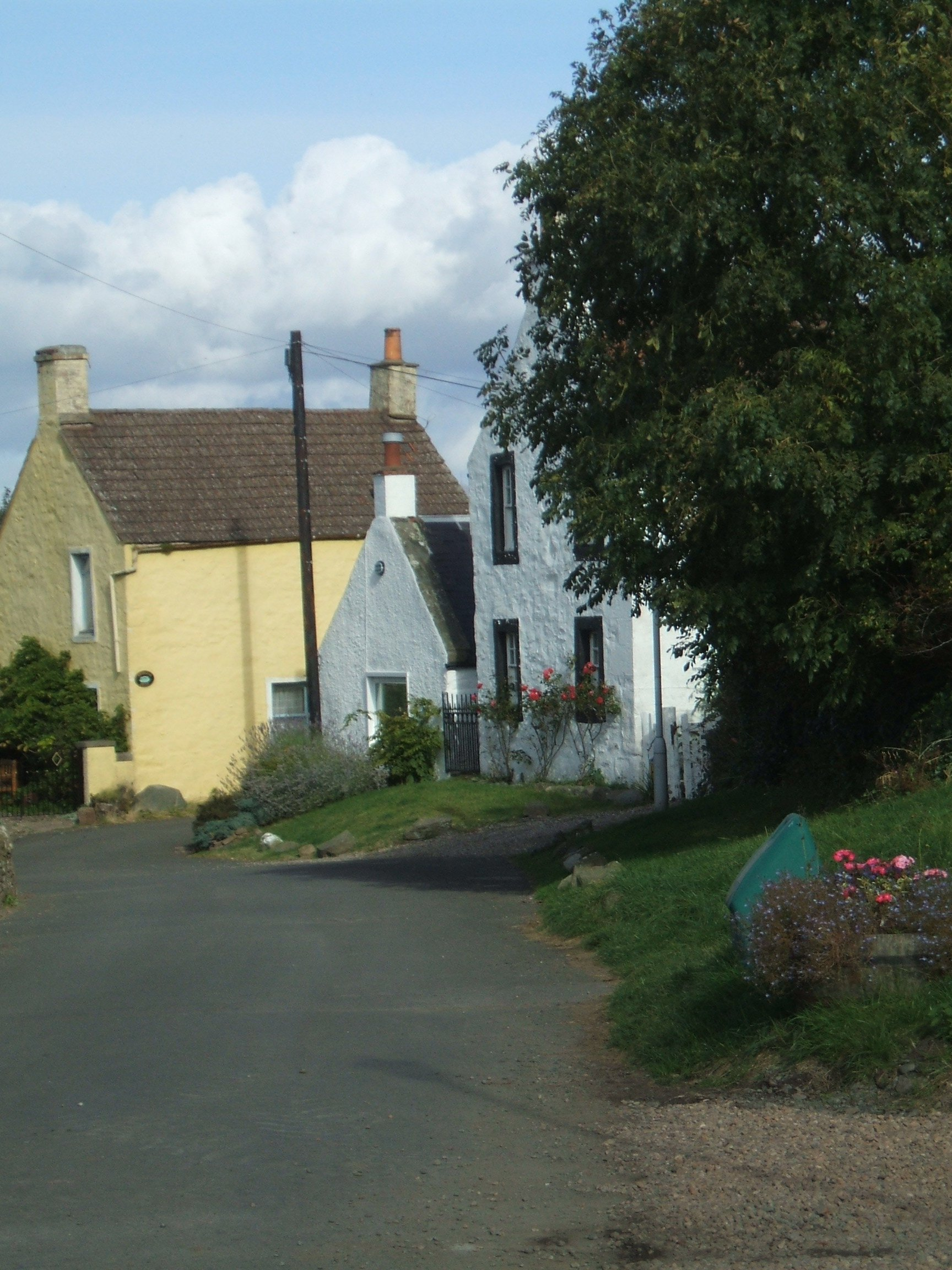

- Location within Fife
- OS grid reference: NO3624
- Council area: Fife
- Country: Scotland
- Sovereign state: United Kingdom
- Post town: NEWPORT-ON-TAY
- Postcode district: DD6
- Dialling code: 01382
- Police: Scotland
- Fire: Scottish
- Ambulance: Scottish
- UK Parliament: North East Fife
- Scottish Parliament: North East Fife

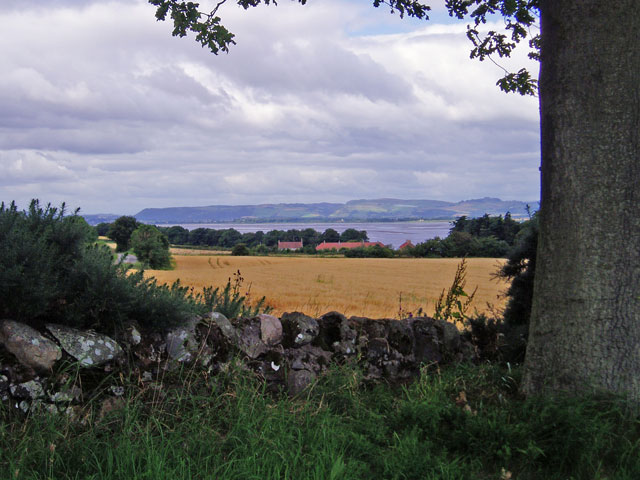
Looking north across the Tay from above Balmerino

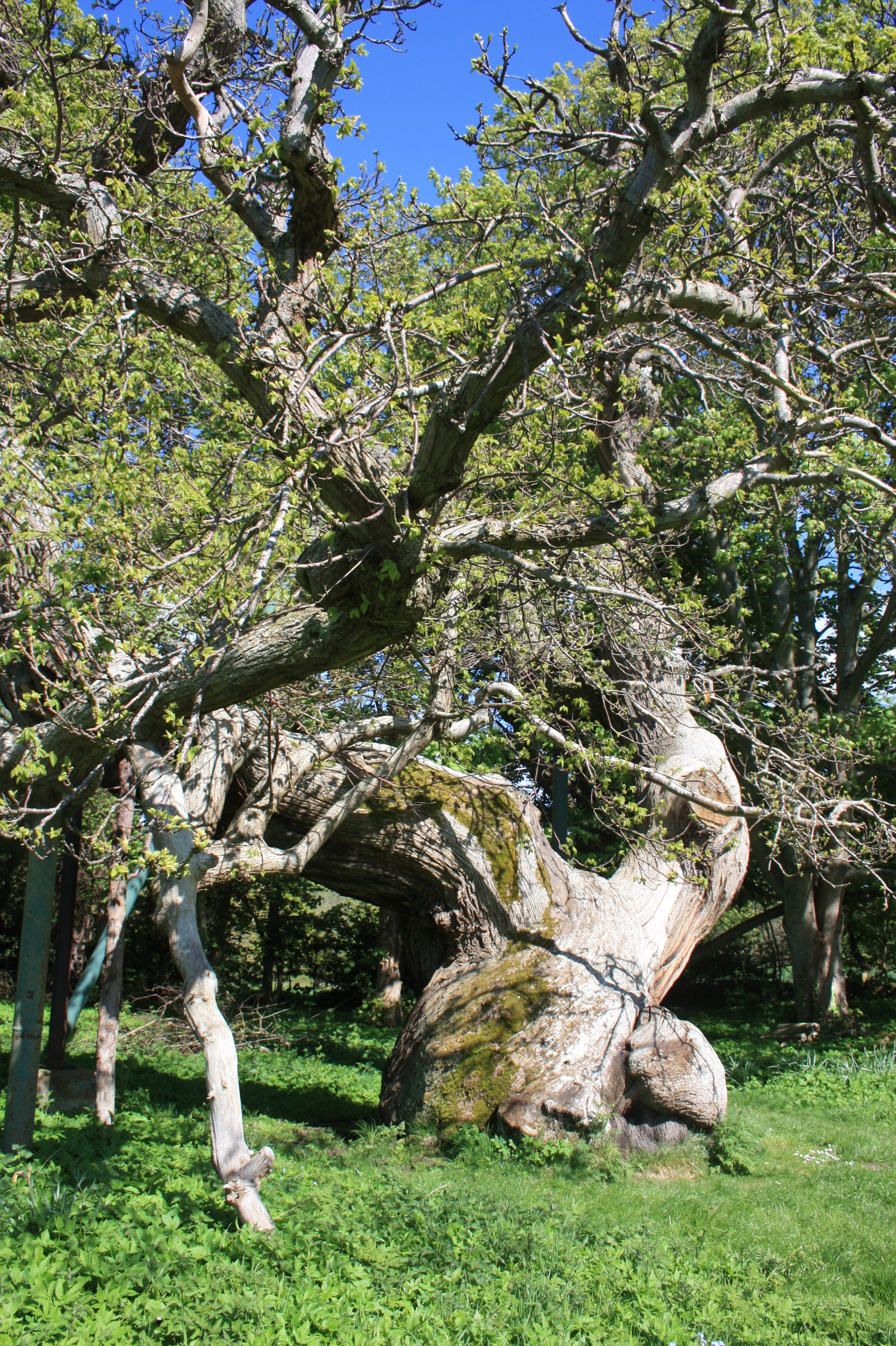
The 450-year-old Spanish chestnut tree at Balmerino in Fife

Balmerino is a small village and former monastic centre in Fife, Scotland. It is the home of Balmerino Abbey and the former abbots of Balmerino who were great regional landlords. It became a secular lordship in 1605 when the abbey's lands were transferred into a barony and the title of Lord Balmerino was created. The already fire-damaged abbey was allowed to fall into ruin as it no longer had a function. The abbey ruins and grounds are managed by the National Trust for Scotland and are famed for the ancient sweet chestnut tree and the display of aconites which flower in February.

The village contains a number of 18th- and 19th-century houses in a local vernacular, and is now an official Conservation Area.

The name Balmerino derives from Scottish Gaelic. The first element, bal-, is from baile, meaning a farmstead, or in modern Gaelic, a town. The second element is more obscure. It may refer to Saint Merinach or it may derive from muranach meaning 'of sea-grass', yielding: "[the] farm where sea-bent or sea-grass grows."

Balmerino Parish Church lies 1 km outside the village and dates from 1811. The manse was added in 1816. Originally a simple Georgian box chapel the church was remodelled in the Gothic style in 1883. The church hall was added in 1887.

Balmerino is "celebrated" in the poem "Beautiful Balmerino" by William McGonagall – widely recognised to be the English language's worst poet.

== Notable people ==
- Andrew Guillan, a weaver of Balmerino, was one of only two men executed for the assassination in 1679 of James Sharp, Archbishop of St Andrews. Guillan was executed despite having played no active part in the murder and having reportedly pleaded for the archbishop's life while holding the perpetrators' horses. The other man executed was David Hackston, of nearby Rathillet, who was also withdrawn. The active participants escaped justice.

== See also ==
- List of places in Fife
