= Newport-on-Tay =

Coordinates: 56.44017°N 2.94103°W

Newport-on-Tay: Scottish Gaelic: Am Port Nuadh; Scots: Newport-on-Tay
- Town
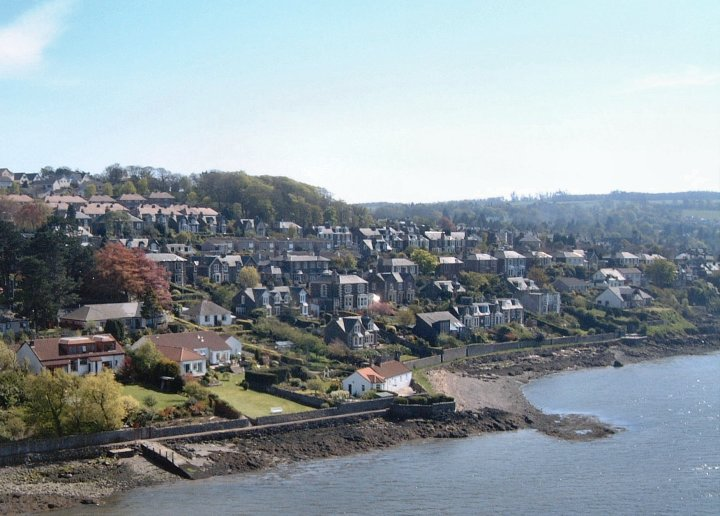

- Location within Fife Location near the Dundee City council area
- Population: 4,118 (2022)
- OS grid reference: NO421279
- Council area: Fife
- Lieutenancy area: Fife
- Country: Scotland
- Sovereign state: United Kingdom
- Post town: NEWPORT-ON-TAY
- Postcode district: DD6
- Dialling code: 01382
- Police: Scotland
- Fire: Scottish
- Ambulance: Scottish
- UK Parliament: North East Fife
- Scottish Parliament: North East Fife

Newport-on-Tay is a town in the north-east of Fife in Scotland. It is approximately 23 miles (55 km) north-northeast of Edinburgh, 67 miles (108 km) northeast of Glasgow, and 3 miles (4.8 km) south-southeast of Dundee. It had a population of 4,118 in 2022.

The Fife Coastal Path passes through Newport-on-Tay. The area itself has views of the two bridges that cross the River Tay and distant views of the Scottish Highlands.

== History ==
Historical populations
Census year	Population
1755	751
1801	916
1851	1,125
1901	4,720
1951	3,727
2001	4,370
2011	4,243
2022	4,118

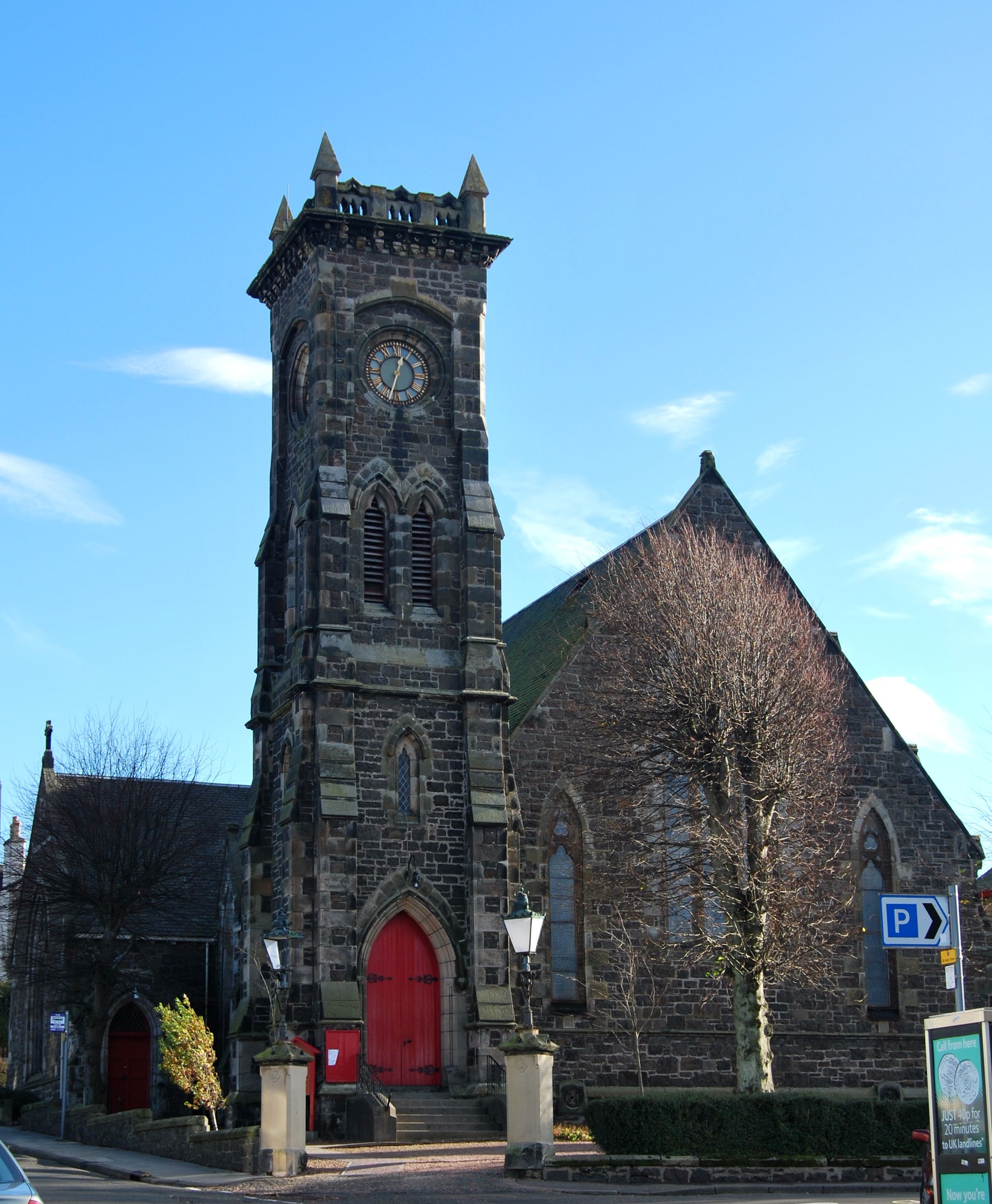
Newport on Tay Church of Scotland

The town was established near the endpoint of one part of a ferry route that itself was started in the 12th century.

In 1715 a new pier and inn were built, the work being funded by the Guilds of Dundee which resulted in the settlement being called "New Dundee". Thomas Telford built a new harbour in the 1820s, and the town expanded and grew into a commuter suburb of Dundee as the prosperous jute manufacturers, industrialists and the middle and upper working class of Dundee established fashionable residences in Newport.

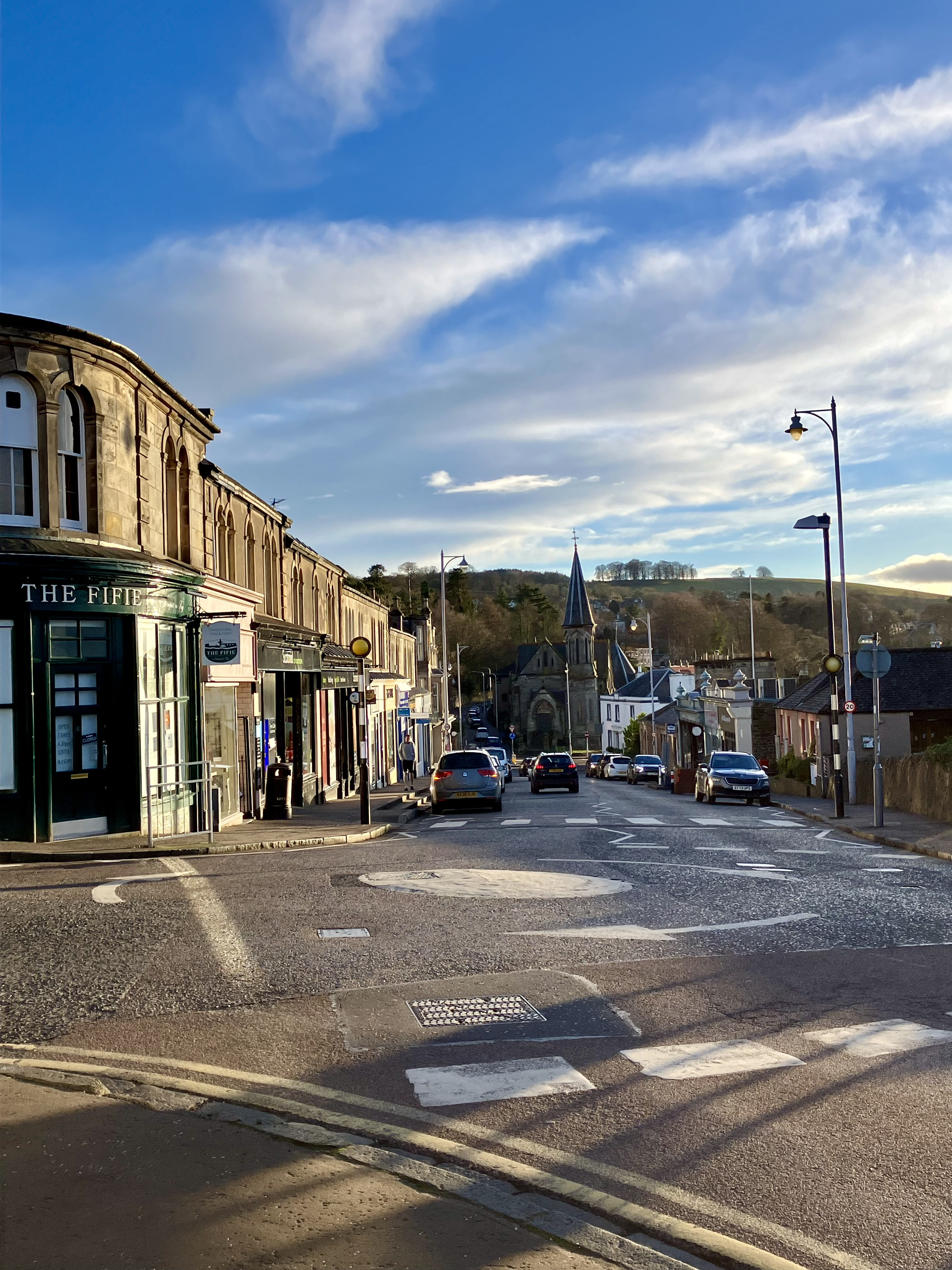
High Street at sunset

The local war memorial dates from 1920 and was designed by Sir Robert Lorimer.

Newport-on-Tay formerly had two railway stations – the East and West stations on what was the Newport Railway. Both stations (and the Tayport-Dundee branch line) closed in 1969, having lost much of their business following the opening of the Tay Road Bridge in 1966. In fact, trains had ceased to run beyond Newport-on-Tay East station to Tayport on 22 May 1966 so that the railway line could be breached to build the bridge's southern approach road. The Dundee – Newport ferry also closed promptly later in 1966 on the opening of the Tay Road Bridge. However, the ferry terminal buildings and slipways still survive at the foot of Boat Hill as a boat repair yard.

Newport-on-Tay seen from Dundee Law.

== Tayfield House ==
The substantial estate of Tayfield was created, almost encompassing the whole landward side of the town, by John Berry (1725–1817) in 1788. The estate stayed in the family for two centuries, with some sections, such as Gowrie Woods, being gifted to the council for public use in 1946. The original house was totally remodelled in 1828 by the architect George Smith, in a Jacobean style, and is now a Listed Building.

== Archaeology ==
An excavation carried out by Headland Archaeology in the farm of North Straiton near Newport-on-Tay uncovered part of a Bronze Age cremation cemetery and a line of postholes. Five human cremations were found in a group of scattered disposal pits. Around 25 metres away was a line of postholes, one of which was also associated with cremated human bone. Radiocarbon dates from the features indicated that they had been created in the Bronze Age, from around 1700 to 2000 BC.

The line of posts was substantial and may have been associated with the cremations rather than a building or fence. It is possible that the posts may have been memorials or markers close to the pyre used to burn the dead. Part of a quern stone and some burnt animal bone suggested that the cremation ceremony also involved preparing food. A collection of pottery was found with the cremations. This included a complete accessory vessel and fragments from a larger decorated pot that covered it.

== Present ==
Newport currently has a population of about four thousand, mostly living in stone houses built before World War II. The town centre comprises two main streets with a small variety of shops and three public houses. The town has one primary school, Newport Primary School. It was built in 1977 by the then Fife Regional Council Architectural Department, with Donald George Beaton working as the school's architect. Older pupils attend secondary school at Madras College in St Andrews, or at Bell Baxter High School in Cupar, or at the nearest independent schools, the High School of Dundee and St Leonards School.

Public bus routes are the M77 to Dundee, 77A to St Andrews, 92 to St Andrews, and the X54 to Edinburgh via Glenrothes (and Ninewells Hospital in the other direction)

Newport has been twinned with Zolotarovo, Ukraine since 20 July 2002.

=== Local amenities ===
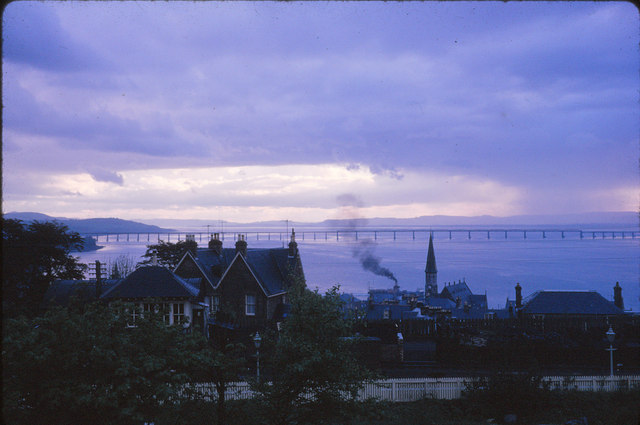
A view of Newport in about 1968 showing the BL Nairn, St. Fillans Church, and the East Station

Amenities on and around the High Street include food and drink stores, health and beauty outlets, trades and services, a variety of shops, an art gallery and a sports centre.

There are three churches:

- Church of Scotland
- Episcopal Church of Scotland (St Mary's)
- Roman Catholic (St. Fillans)

A second Church of Scotland church, St. Fillans, originally a Free Church, was demolished in 1981.

== Newport-on-Tay and the arts ==
The arts have played a major role in the shaping of Newport and its neighbourhood. In 1905 the Tayport Artists' Circle was formed, including James Douglas, Anna Douglas, Alec Grieve, Stewart Carmichael, William Bradley Lamond, Charles Adamson and the so-called "Painter's painter" David Foggie. Led by Frank Laing, their aim was to have an influence through art on the industrial environment; this is explained in a letter from Laing to the town planner/architect Patrick Geddes.

Many teachers of fine art in the University of Dundee's Duncan of Jordanstone College of Art and Design have migrated towards Newport-on-Tay and its north-west facing position for the quality of light. Scottish artists such as John Byrne, Will Maclean and Marian Leven are associated with the area. A local community arts centre, The Forgan Arts, provides courses in arts and crafts. The Tatha art gallery opened in Newport-on-Tay in 2014.

== Notable people ==
- Sir John Leng (1828–1906), politician and publisher.
- John Leng Sturrock (1878–1943), politician
- Valentine Fleming (1882–1917), Conservative politician
- George Ranken Tudhope (1893–1955) pathologist
- Sir Charles Lambe (1900–1960), First Sea Lord, Admiral of the Fleet; born in Dorset, residence Newport, died Newport 1960
- Marie Dare (1902–1976), composer and cellist was born here
- Scott Sutherland (1910–1984), sculptor
- Dave Duncan (1933–2018), writer was born here
- Horse McDonald (born 1958), singer–songwriter was born here.
- Philip Fleming (banker), Olympic gold medalist
