= Alec Grieve =

Dundee artist

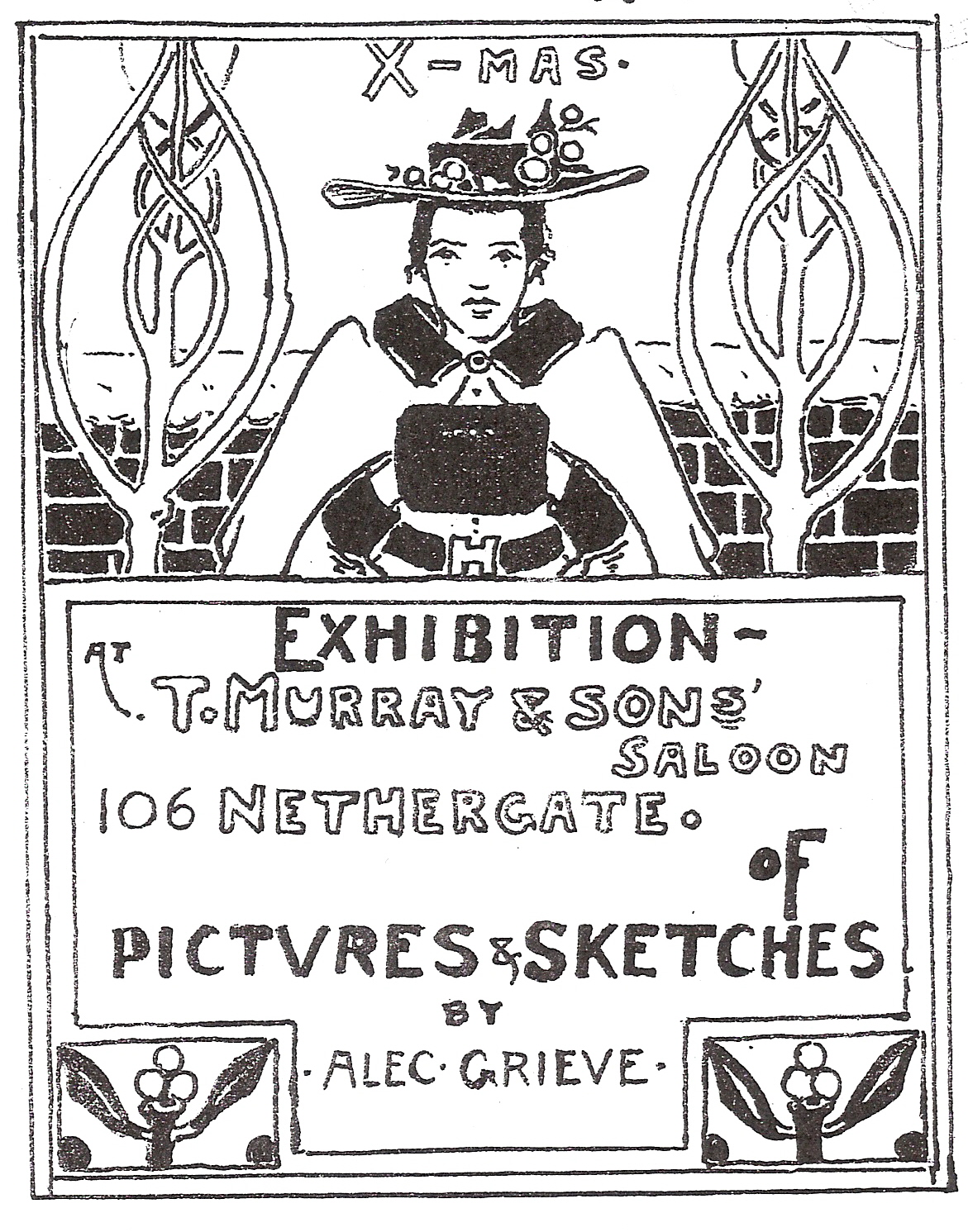
A poster for Alec Grieve's exhibition held in Dundee in 1897

Alec Grieve (1864–1933) was a Dundee artist best known for his symbolist and landscape paintings. He was born in Dundee on 13 October 1864.

== Early life and work ==
He began studying art at Dundee School of Art in the High School of Dundee and first exhibited his work with the Dundee Art Club in 1888. Befriending the artists John Duncan and Stewart Carmichael, he moved to London at around the same time as them, working both as a commercial artist for various publishers and exhibiting at the Royal Academy of Arts. Around 1889 he went on to further study at the Académie Colarossi in Paris. Grieve returned to Dundee in 1890, showing at the Dundee Fine Art Exhibition that year and joining the Graphic Arts Association soon after, becoming one of the most prolific contributors to the Association's annual exhibitions

By 1893 he had taken a studio in the former Theatre Royal building at 15 Castle Street in Dundee. Several Dundee artists had come together here to occupy the city’s first shared artists’ studio, including Stewart Carmichael, Max Cowper and the sculptor Margaret Suttie, who exhibited a bust of Grieve at the 1895 Dundee Fine Art Exhibition. In 1893 Grieve held a solo exhibition from his Castle Street studio, at which landscape paintings were the most acclaimed.

Grieve's early landscape paintings were particularly inspired by the ‘Nocturnes’ of Whistler. Their influence is apparent in many of Grieve's early exhibits at the Graphic Art Association – Nightfall (1894), Nocturne in Grey – the Tay Ferries (1895), Nocturne – A Moonlight Sonata (1896) and Nocturne – Moonlight on the Tay (1897). But Grieve’s colour scheme gradually brightened, as can clearly be seen by comparing his two views of Pont du Cheval, Bruges in Dundee's permanent collection.

== Later life and work ==
Grieve painted symbolist or religious works such as Death and the Miser (1893), Sancta Spirita (1897) and The Longing of Eve (1898) that sought to express his intellectual ideals. The critics largely ignored these in favour of his landscapes, but when they did receive attention, opinion was decidedly mixed. The Advertiser referred to Grieve’s “dangerous quality of imagination” and “original ideas”. A writer in the Evening Telegraph found The Longing of Eve “simply horrible”.

More serious attention was paid in 1897, when Grieve held a second solo exhibition in Thomas Murray’s gallery in Nethergate. After this show, critics reacted more positively to his work. Finis (1898) was widely praised, and after its debut at the Graphic Arts Association exhibition was shown at the Glasgow Institute and Royal Scottish Academy.

Grieve was also a firm believer in socialism. During his time in London he became a close friend of Keir Hardie, and was the cartoonist for many years on Hardie’s periodical the Labour Leader. He was a member of the Independent Labour Party and the Dundee Central Workers Committee and often wrote about the role of art in the labour movement.

Grieve’s figurative work had always shown a keen sympathy for the working class. In 1894, for example, he created a set of twelve etchings under the title The Blind at Work, showing scenes of life in the Dundee Blind Institution.

Grieve’s many rural landscape paintings did not generally reveal his political sympathies, a notable exception being the 1903 painting The Ploughman and the Crows (now in Perth Museum & Art Gallery). It was exhibited at the Graphic Arts Association exhibition that year and later at the Paris Salon, where it was hung on the line and attracted considerable attention for its political symbolism – the crows as capitalists living off the fruits of the working man’s toil.

Grieve moved to Tayport after his marriage in 1897, taking a studio at West Lights. In 1904 he and Frank Laing became the founders of the Tayport Artists' Circle, an exhibiting body of artists hoping to emulate the commercial success of other artists' colonies such as at Newlyn. Their first exhibition was held in Tayport in 1905, with three exhibitions following in Dundee in 1905–07 and one in Edinburgh in 1907.

Grieve died in 1933 just a few days after the opening of his group exhibition at the Victoria Galleries with Stewart Carmichael and John Maclauchlan Milne (the three had previously shown together in the Dundee Art Society rooms in 1920). A memorial exhibition of Grieve’s work was held two years later, at which it was noted that his work had “steadily advanced from a sort of poetical obscurity to notable brilliancy of colour”

A lithograph portrait of Grieve by Stewart Carmichael is in the collections of Dundee Art Galleries & Museums.
