= Newport-on-Tay West railway station =

Disused railway station in Newport-on-Tay, Fife

Newport-on-Tay West

General information
- Location: Newport-on-Tay, Fife; Scotland
- Coordinates: 56.4339°N 2.9459°W
- Grid reference: NO417272
- Platforms: 1

Other information
- Status: Disused

History
- Original company: Newport Railway
- Pre-grouping: North British Railway
- Post-grouping: London and North Eastern Railway

Key dates
- 12 May 1879: Opened as West Newport
- 12 January 1880: Closed
- 20 June 1887: Reopened
- 1950: Name changed to Newport-on-Tay West
- 5 May 1969: Closed
Location

Newport-on-Tay West railway station served the town of Newport-on-Tay, Fife, Scotland, from 1879 to 1969 on the Newport Railway.

== History ==
The station was opened as West Newport on 12 May 1879 by the Newport Railway. On the west end was the station building, which was brick built. It closed on 12 January 1880 but reopened on 20 June 1887. Its name was changed to Newport-on-Tay West in 1950. It closed on 5 May 1969.

Preceding station	Disused railways	Following station
Newport-on-Tay East; Line and station closed	Newport Railway	Wormit; Line and station closed
