= Newport Railway =

Newport Railway may refer to:

== In Australia ==
- Newport–Sunshine railway line: a railway line in the western suburbs of Melbourne, Australia.

== In the United Kingdom ==
=== In England ===
==== Mainland ====
- Newport, Abergavenny and Hereford Railway: a railway line connecting the Welsh port of Newport to the English town of Hereford.
- Newport Pagnell Railway: a branch line in Buckinghamshire, United Kingdom running from Wolverton to Newport Pagnell.

==== Isle of Wight ====
- Cowes and Newport Railway Company: a predecessor to the Isle of Wight Central Railway.
- Freshwater, Yarmouth and Newport Railway: a railway that followed a route westwards out of Newport, Isle of Wight.
- Isle of Wight (Newport Junction) Railway: a line between Sandown and Newport.
- Newport, Godshill and St Lawrence Railway: a branch of the Isle of Wight Central Railway.
- Ryde and Newport Railway: a predecessor to the Isle of Wight Central Railway.

=== In Scotland ===
- Newport Railway, Scotland: a line along the south bank of the estuary of the River Tay in the east coast of Scotland.

=== In Wales ===
- Newport, Abergavenny and Hereford Railway: a railway line connecting the Welsh port of Newport to the English town of Hereford.
- Pontypool, Caerleon and Newport Railway: a line between its namesake towns in Monmouthshire, South Wales.
- Pontypridd, Caerphilly and Newport Railway: a line connecting the collieries of the Aberdare and Rhondda valleys with Newport.
- Newport and Pontypool Railway: a railway between the eastern South Wales Valleys and the River Usk at Newport.

== In the United States ==
- Herkimer, Newport and Poland Railway: a component of the New York Central Railroad.
- Old Colony & Newport Railway: part of a railroad system in southeastern Massachusetts and parts of Rhode Island.
- Old Colony and Newport Scenic Railway: a heritage railroad in Rhode Island.
- Santa Ana and Newport Railway: a short line that ran through present-day Costa Mesa and Newport Beach, California.
