= W.M. Mackenzie =

W.M. Mackenzie may refer to:

- Billy Mackenzie (William MacArthur MacKenzie, 1957–1997), Scottish singer
- William Macdonald Mackenzie (1797–1856), Scottish architect
- William Mackay Mackenzie (1871–1952), Scottish historian, archaeologist and writer
