= Ernest Geoffrey Cullwick =

British scientist (1903–1981)

Ernest Geoffrey Cullwick FRSE OBE (24 May 1903 – 13 May 1981) was a British pioneer of electromagnetism in relation to its effects upon atomic particles. He served as Director of Electrical Engineering for the Royal Canadian Navy and Director of the Electrical Research Division of the Defense Research Board of Canada.

Cullwick was a critic of the Special Theory of Relativity, and an amateur bookbinder of great skill.

== Life ==
He was born at 14 Snow Hill in Wolverhampton in 1903, the youngest son of Herbert Ernest Cullwick (1859–1945) and his wife, Edith Ada Ascough. In 1905 his father was Director of Cullwicks Ltd, a company going into liquidation. Ernest attended Wolverhampton Grammar School. He won a place to Downing College, Cambridge graduating BA in 1925 and won a Foundation Scholarship leading to an MA in 1929. He studied as a postgraduate at St Andrews University where he obtained a DSc. He then moved to Canada working as an assistant professor at the University of British Columbia.

In 1937, he was made Professor of Electrical Engineering at the University of Alberta. Whilst officially holding this role until 1947, the post was disrupted by the Second World War, during which he served as a Technical Director for both the Royal Canadian Air Force and the Royal Canadian Navy. In 1947 he transferred to be Director of the Electrical Research Division of the Defense Research Board of Canada, based in Ottawa.

Cullwick was awarded the Order of the British Empire (OBE) in 1946 for his war service.

In 1949, he returned to Britain to take on the role of Professor of Electrical Engineering at the University of St Andrews where he also became Dean of the Faculty of Science. In 1967 he transferred to Dundee University which shared facilities with St Andrews. In 1950, he was elected a Fellow of the Royal Society of Edinburgh. His proposers were George Dawson Preston, Edward Thomas Copson, John F. Allen, and John Meadows Jackson.

Cullwick retired in 1973 and moved to Dover, where he died in 1981.

== Publications ==
- Fundamentals of Electromagnetism (1939)
- Electromagnetism and Relativity (1957)
- The Clock Paradox (1963)
- Electromagnetic Momentum and Newton’s Third Law

== Family ==
He married Mamie Ruttan Boucher in 1929. They had one son and one daughter.
