= Tayport railway station =

Former railway station in Fife, Scotland

Tayport
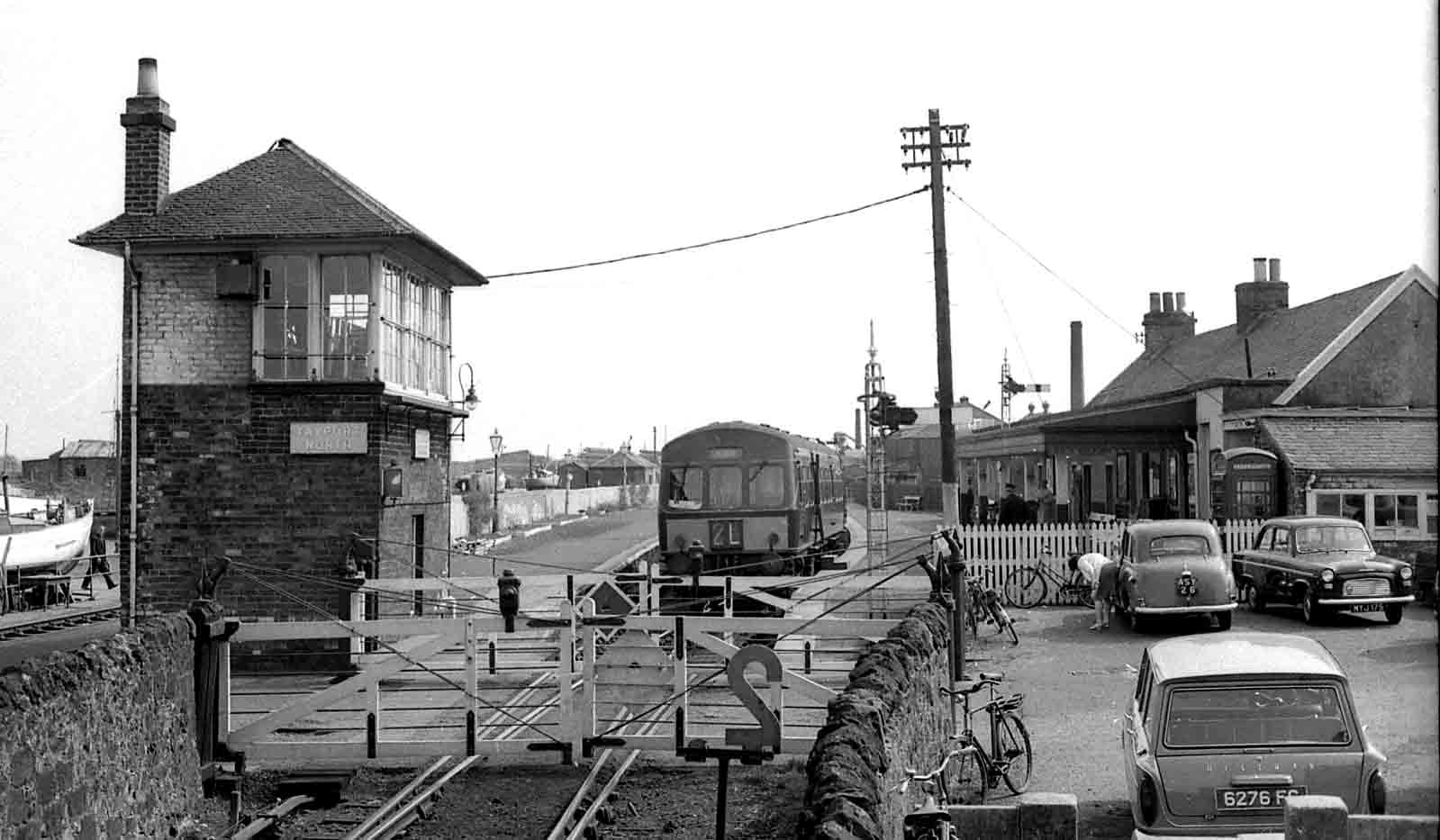
- A DMU at Tayport

General information
- Location: Tayport, Fife; Scotland
- Coordinates: 56.4505°N 2.8807°W
- Grid reference: NO458290
- Platforms: 2

Other information
- Status: Disused

History
- Original company: Edinburgh and Northern Railway
- Pre-grouping: North British Railway; Newport Railway
- Post-grouping: LNER

Key dates
- 17 May 1848: Station opened as Ferryport-on-Craig
- 1851: renamed Tayport
- 22 May 1966: Passenger service withdrawn
- 18 September 1967: Station closed
Location

Tayport railway station served the town of Tayport, Fife, Scotland from 1848 to 1967 on the Newport Railway.

== History ==
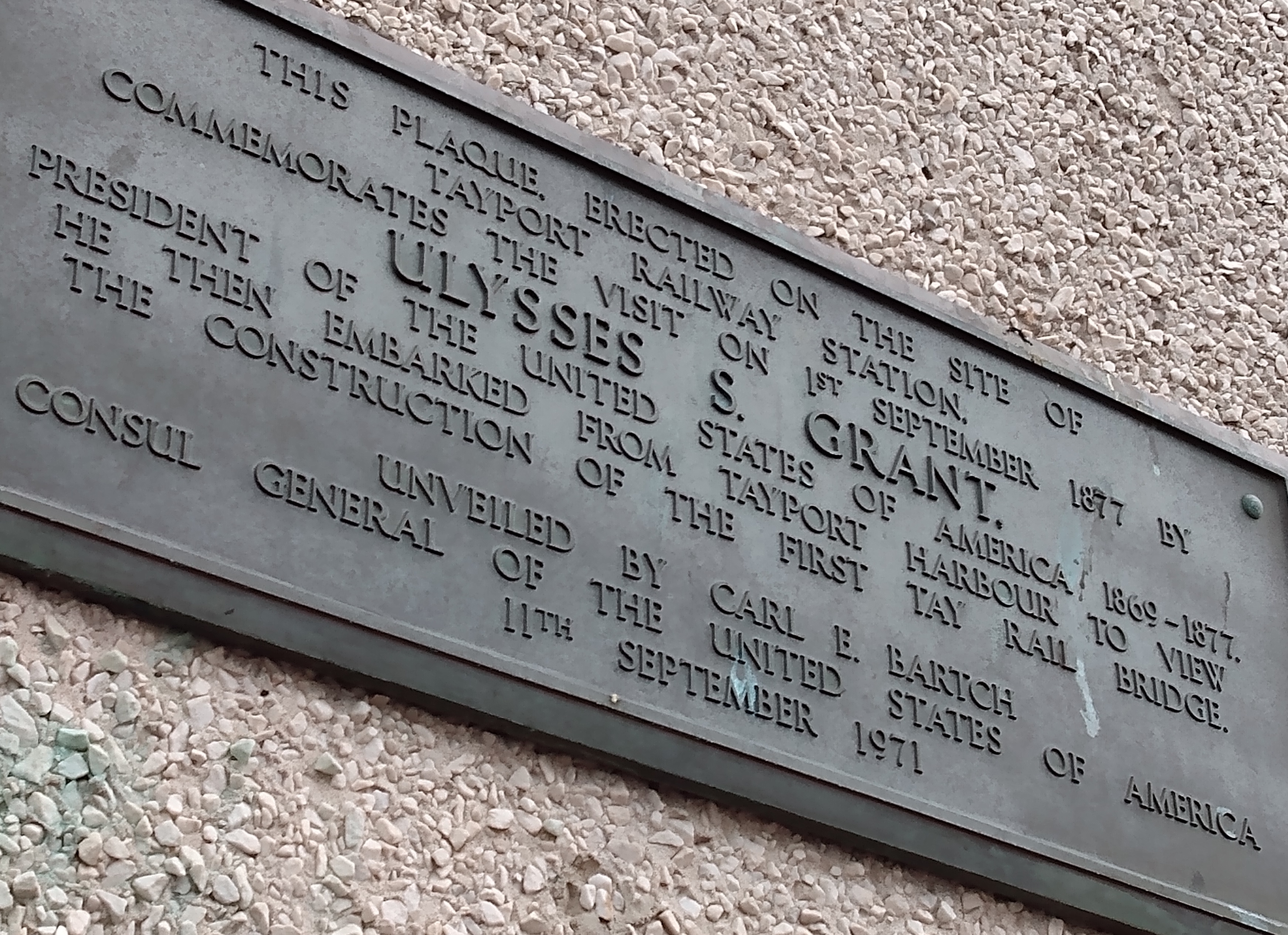
A plaque on the site of Tayport railway station commemorating a visit in 1877 by former President of the United States Ulysses S. Grant.

The station opened on 17 May 1848 by the Edinburgh and Northern Railway as Ferryport-on-Craig but was renamed to its later name in 1851. It was east of Tayport Docks, which had freight sidings that served the docks themselves and a timber yard. The line to Leuchars was closed to passengers on 9 January 1956 and completely on 18 September 1967. Passenger service to Dundee was withdrawn on 22 May 1966 to facilitate construction of the Tay Road Bridge. The station officially closed to both passengers and goods traffic on 18 September 1967.

Preceding station	Disused railways	Following station
Newport-on-Tay East; Line and station closed	Newport Railway	Leuchars (Old); Line and station closed
