= Lamond =

Lamond is both a surname and a given name. Notable people with the name include:

Surname:

- William Bradley Lamond (1857–1924), Scottish painter
- Hector Lamond (1865–1947), Australian politician
- Frederic Lamond (pianist) (1868–1948), Scottish classical pianist and composer
- Henry George Lamond (1885–1969), Australian farmer and writer
- Alfred Lamond (1886–1967), Australian politician
- Angus Lamond (1909–1965), American lacrosse player
- Don Lamond (1920–2003), American jazz drummer
- Bill Lamond (1920–1990), Australian politician
- James Lamond (1928–2007), British Labour politician
- Frederic Lamond (Wiccan) (1931–2020), Wiccan elder and author
- Toni Lamond (1932–2025), Australian cabaret singer, stage actor, dancer and comedian
- Mary Jane Lamond (born 1960), Canadian folk musician
- George Lamond (born 1967), American musician
- Mike Lamond (born 1987), American former sports commentator and Internet celebrity

Given name:

- Lamond Murray (born 1973), American professional basketball player
- Lamond (born 1997), American rapper

Origin: A brief summary of the origin - The surname Lamond originated from Scotland, from the Clan Lamont. Over time many Lamont's changed their names to Lamond. The Lamont Castle is located in Dunoon in Western Scotland.

== See also ==
- Lamond-Riggs, a residential neighborhood in Northeast Washington, D.C.
