= Tudhope =

Tudhope is a surname. Notable people with the surname include:

- Ben Tudhope (born 1999), Australian Paralympian
- Danny Tudhope (born 1985), Scottish jockey
- George Ranken Tudhope (1893–1955), Scottish pathologist
- James Brockett Tudhope (1858–1936), Canadian manufacturer and politician
  - Tudhope Building, Orillia, Ontario, Canada
- John Henry Tudhope (1891–1956), South African flying ace
- Philip Tudhope (1898–?), South African flying ace
- Ryan Tudhope, American visual effects supervisor

== See also ==
- Tudehope, surname
