= Newport Railway, Scotland =

Former railway line in Scotland

The Newport Railway was a Scottish railway company that built a line along the south bank of the Firth of Tay in Fife. The line was opened in 1879, and connected to the Tay Bridge, giving quick access to Dundee; daily residential travel to Dundee from Tayport became a practicality.

The use of the bridge gave the railway a massive advantage in passenger and goods transport across the Tay, until the opening of the Tay Road Bridge in 1966. Closure of the railway swiftly followed, and there is no railway use of the route at the present day.

== First railways ==
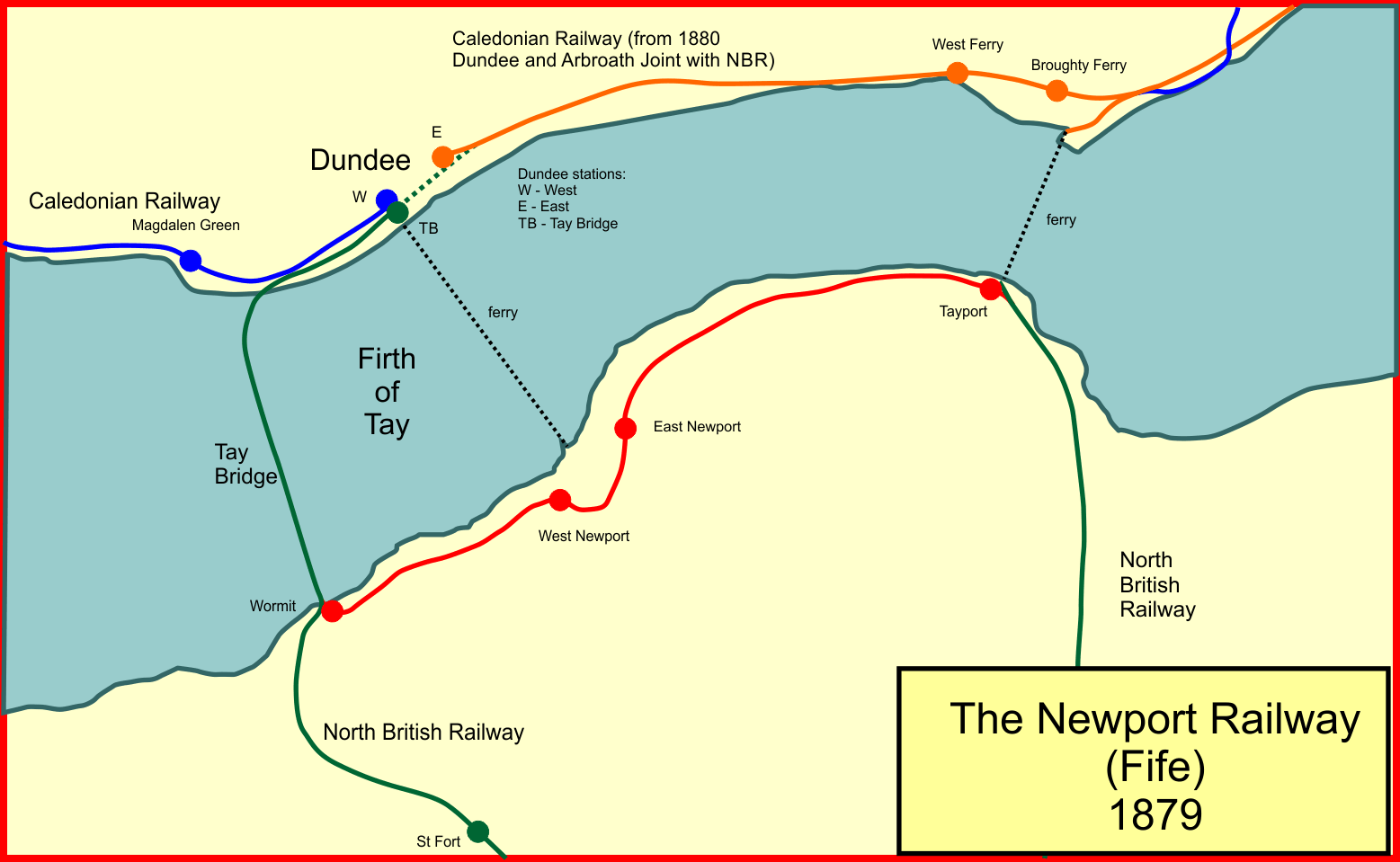
The Newport Railway in 1879

The first railway serving the north-eastern part of Fife was the Edinburgh and Northern Railway, authorised in 1845. Its main lines were built from Burntisland to Perth and to Ferry-Port-on-Craig, and opened in 1849. Ferry-Port-on-Craig was the harbour for the ferry crossing the River Tay to Broughty, and passengers and goods to and from Dundee used the Dundee and Arbroath Railway from Broughty. In 1851 Ferry-Port-on-Craig station was renamed Tay-Port (later Tayport) and the E&NR altered its name to the Edinburgh, Perth and Dundee Railway. The ferry between Tay-Port and Broughty for goods and mineral traffic was adapted to take railway wagons on the vessel; this was a very early instance of roll-on roll-off ferry operation. (Passengers travelled on conventional ferries on the route.)

Tay-Port was little more than a ferry terminal, having been overtaken by the town of Newport-on-Tay, a few miles to the west, which, before the railway, had a more convenient ferry to Dundee. Indeed, the early deliberations of the Edinburgh and Northern Railway included the possibility of taking the route of the railway through Newport, either for a bridge or as a ferry terminal. Newport had a population of 1,326 at the 1861 census.

In 1856 local interests promoted a Tayport and Craighead Railway; it was to run from the Edinburgh, Perth and Dundee Railway station at Tayport, and run to a pier on the River Tay at Craighead, at the north-eastern extremity of Newport.

This scheme, in effect duplicating the EP&DR route to Dundee, came to nothing. In 1862 the EP&DR was absorbed by the growing North British Railway. Local people in Newport saw the benefits that being situated on a railway line offered, and from 1860 there had been gathering momentum behind the construction by the EP&DR and the North British Railway of a Tay Bridge. This would transform the fortunes of North Fife, and more particularly it offered an opportunity to the railway promoters of Newport. A line from Tay-Port to the Fife end of the Tay Bridge would connect into the southward railway network at Tay-Port and towards Dundee at the bridge. A six-mile railway linking the two was what they wanted.

== The Newport Railway ==
Newport Railway
Overview
- Locale: Scotland
- Dates of operation: 1879–1969

Technical
- Track gauge: 4 ft 8 1/2 in (1,435 mm)

Newport Railway Act 1866
- Act of Parliament
- Parliament of the United Kingdom
- Long title: An Act for making a Railway from the North British Railway to Newport; and for other Purposes.
- Citation: 29 & 30 Vict. c. cccxxix

Dates
- Royal assent: 6 August 1866

Accordingly, the Newport Railway obtained its authorising act of Parliament, the Newport Railway Act 1866 (29 & 30 Vict. c. cccxxix), on 6 August 1866, with share capital of £96,000. However the act only authorised the share capital, and at a subscription meeting on 5 November 1866 to permit the public to subscribe, no-one turned up: there was not enough ready money locally to pay for a railway.

There was much worse to come; the North British Railway was in serious financial difficulty, and was being called upon to repay substantial secured loans; at the same time shareholder agitation that the NBR had been over-reaching itself financially took hold. The directors of the NBR had to bow to the pressure, and the parliamentary bill for the planned Tay Bridge was withdrawn. With it, for the time being, went the plans of the Newport Railway. They did not want to lose their railway altogether, so they cut it back to the 1856 scheme:

"The promoters of the Newport Railway have, in consequence of the abandonment of the Tay Bridge, found it necessary to abandon part of their scheme, and a Bill is to be brought forward authorising them to make the terminus of the line at Craighead, which would be convenient for East, but scarcely so for West, Newport."

— Dundee Advertiser, 17 November 1866

Craighead is some distance north-east of Newport, at a place where the crossing to Dundee is narrowest, and there may have been thoughts of establishing a ferry pier there cheaply.

"The Newport Railway: This line, which is only scheduled to come up to Craighead Cottage, has a length of two miles all but seven yards. The present plans show a deviation from those of last year; the line being now taken at a lower level, nearer the water's edge. It is only to be regretted that it is to terminate for the present so far to the east of Newport."

— Dundee Advertiser, 1 December 1866

Newport Railway Act 1867
- Act of Parliament
- Parliament of the United Kingdom
- Long title: An Act for making a Deviation of Part of the Newport Railway; for relinquishing a Portion of said Railway; and for other Purposes.
- Citation: 30 & 31 Vict. c. clvii

Dates
- Royal assent: 25 July 1867

Text of statute as originally enacted

The much-reduced railway got its revised authorisation in the Newport Railway Act 1867 (30 & 31 Vict. c. clvii); putting a brave face on the situation, the directors reported that:

The abandonment of the Tay Bridge scheme rendered it necessary to delay taking any steps under the powers conferred on the Company by the Act. To afford to the rising and populous village of Newport more easy access to Dundee on the one hand, and connection with the railway system to the south on the other, as well as to give greater facilities of access between Dundee and Ferry-Port-on-Craig, were the objects sought to be obtained by the original Act; and, as there was no prospect of the original scheme being carried out for a considerable time, it seemed desirable to your Directors, if it were possible to do so, to accomplish these objects by a modified plan... It was arranged, in view of [the North British Railway] Company improving their station at Dundee, to construct a short line commencing at the terminus at Tayport, and terminating at a point near Craighead Cottage, to the east of Newport. Accordingly, application was made in the last session of Parliament for an Act to empower your Company to deviate and relinquish a portion of the line; and your Directors are happy to report that the Bill passed both Houses of Parliament unopposed, and received the Royal Assent on 26th July last. In consequence of the financial position of the North British Railway Company, your Directors have not yet completed any arrangements for carrying out of the line. They, however, hope to do so shortly.

— Fife Herald, 3 October 1867

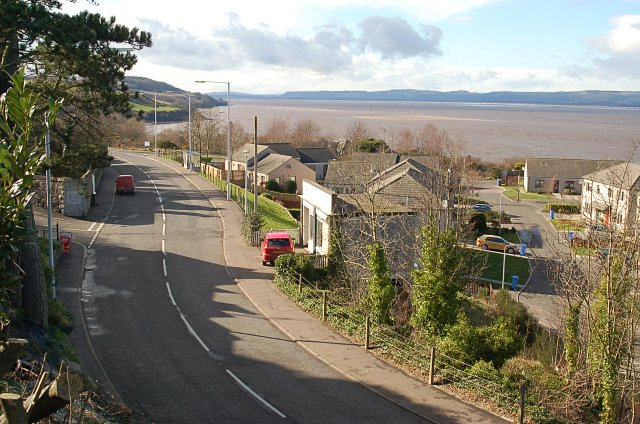
The site of Wormit station at the present day.

The chairman betrayed his pessimism about the financial prospects of the Newport company:

At the conclusion of the meeting, the Chairman remarked that if the North British Railway would guarantee a small dividend, and work the line at a moderate rate, with a lien to the shareholders, as they did on the St Andrews and other branches of the North British system, he had no doubt that great interest would be given to the scheme.

— Fife Herald, 3 October 1867

== Back to the original route ==
Newport Railway Act 1870
- Act of Parliament
- Parliament of the United Kingdom
- Long title: An Act for making a Railway extending from the authorised Newport Railway to Long Craig, in the County of Fife; for abandoning the Newport Deviation Railway; and for other purposes.
- Citation: 33 & 34 Vict. c. cliii

Dates
- Royal assent: 1 August 1870

Text of statute as originally enacted

The North British Railway did not pick up the invitation to take over the little company. However it soon managed to put its financial problems behind it, and the scheme to build a Tay Bridge was back on. The Newport Railway was quick to spot the changed circumstances, and in 1870 it obtained a third act of Parliament, the Newport Railway Act 1870 (33 & 34 Vict. c. cliii), reinstating the original route, to build throughout from Tayport to the Tay Bridge. It managed to assemble the capital it required to build its line.

== Opening ==
The Tay Bridge opened on 1 June 1878 and the Newport Railway Company progressed with building its line. It opened to traffic on 12 May 1879 between Newport and the relocated Tayport station, (Note: Tayport station had been built as a terminus station facing the jetty there; when the Newport company transformed it into a through station, it was relocated a short distance.) and throughout on 13 May 1879: The Tay-Port ferry closed and residential travel from the Fife coast to Dundee became a practical possibility.

The line was single track except for a crossing loop at Tayport and another at Wormit. A crossing loop was provided at East Newport in 1878. Tay-Port became Fife's largest station north of Cupar.

In the down direction, the line from Tayport to East Newport climbed at 1 in 83 and 1 in 72 for 2.5 miles, and was then broadly level to beyond the station, then falling at 1 in 103 and 1 in 193 for about a mile past West Newport, levelling off to 1 in 313 for a quarter mile, then falling at 1 in 66 to Wormit tunnel; through the tunnel the line fell at 1 in 178.

== The Tay Bridge disaster and afterwards ==
However the new railway was not to be open for long; on 28 December 1879 part of the Tay Bridge fell, taking a train with it, in the Tay Bridge disaster, in which 75 persons perished. The Newport Railway had lost its connection to Dundee. Suddenly the Tay-Port end of the line became the route to Dundee once again, by way of the ferry to Broughty. The ferry had been closed down when the Tay Bridge was opened, and it had to be quickly reinstated.

Beyond the loss of life, this was a massive set back for the North British Railway, and the company set about the business of building a replacement. The reconstructed Tay Bridge opened to passenger trains on 20 June 1887, (Note: Goods trains had been running since 13 June.) and the Newport line was connected to a rearranged junction at Wormit.

The passenger trains service consisted of four through trains from Leuchars to Dundee in addition to 13 weekday trains from Tayport to Dundee. A limited-stop passenger service achieved a ten-minute journey from Dundee to Newport West, fourteen minutes to Newport East. The Wormit to Tayport line was one of the few Scottish branch lines to offer Sunday services, in connection with attendance at divine service in Dundee by Fife residents.

== From 1900 ==
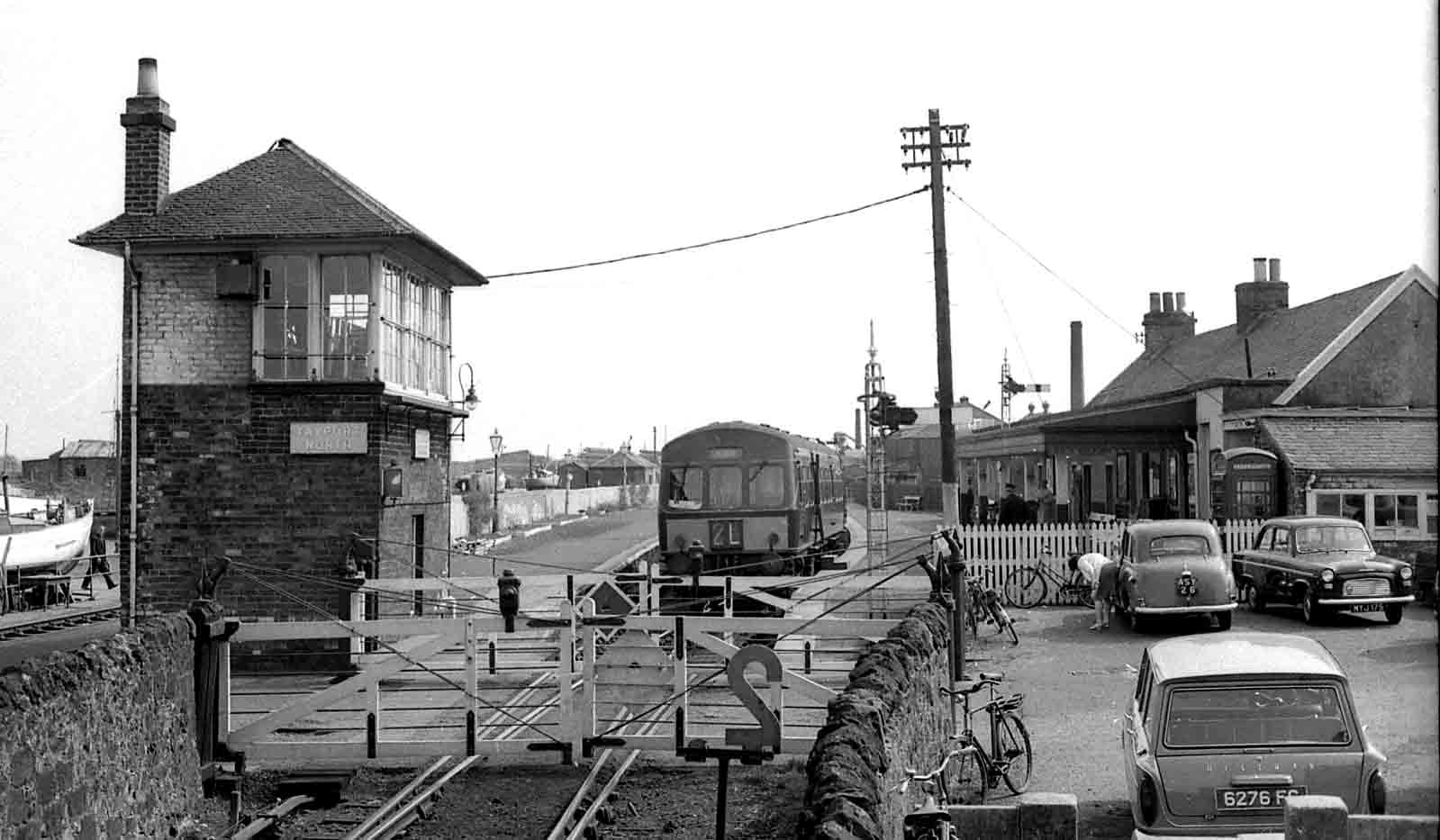
Diesel multiple unit train at Tayport station in May 1958

The Newport Railway Company was absorbed by the North British Railway on 6 August 1900 by the North British Railway (General Powers) Act 1900 (63 & 64 Vict. c. ccix).

By April 1910 the passenger train service was 21 trains each way daily.

A train derailed at Wormit on 28 May 1955. It was a school special excursion returning from Tayport to Dundee; an LMS class 5 steam engine running tender first derailed on the sharp curve emerging from the tunnel. Three persons were killed and 42 injured. Excessive speed on the curve was the immediate cause, and both the driver and the guard had been drinking.

== The road bridge, and closure ==
The Newport-on-Tay branch, as it had become, enjoyed a high level of patronage, and the existence of the Tay (Rail) Bridge enabled daily commuter travel to Dundee. In the late 1950s it became obvious that this monopoly position had a limited life, as the Tay Road Bridge began to be constructed.

The line from Leuchars to Tayport had closed in 1956, and Tayport was served from the Wormit end by the branch. On 22 May 1966 the section of the branch from Newport East to Tayport was closed, although Tayport station remained open to issue tickets on the replacement bus service, and to handle parcels. (Note: Thomas, in Forgotten Railways, says that "Tayport to Newport East was closed completely on 18 December 1967 on the encroachment of the Tay Road Bridge works." As the approach road to the bridge cut across the route of the line to Tayport the latter was closed.) The remainder of the branch was to be closed on 6 January 1969, but it was delayed when the local authority demanded the provision of a turning circle for buses at Wormit station; finally the entire branch closed on 5 May 1969.

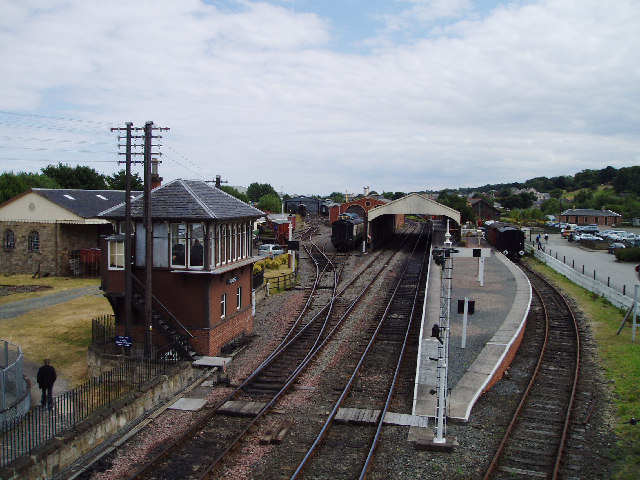
Some buildings from Wormit Station have now been re-erected at the Scottish Railway Preservation Society

The Scottish Railway Preservation Society dismantled some of the station buildings at Wormit and re-erected them at Bo'ness on the south bank of the Forth estuary. They are still in use today by the society's heritage railway.

== Station list ==
- Leuchars (Old); Edinburgh and Northern Railway station; opened 1848; closed 1921;
- Tayport; Edinburgh and Northern Railway station; closed 22 May 1966, but buses ran until 18 December 1967;
- East Newport; opened 12 May 1879; renamed Newport-on-Tay East by 1955; closed 5 May 1969;
- West Newport; opened 12 May 1879; closed 12 January 1880; re-opened 20 June 1887; renamed Newport-on-Tay West by 1955; closed 5 May 1969;
- Wormit; opened 1 May 1889; closed 5 May 1969.

== Archives ==
Miscellaneous papers relating to the Newport Railway including legal papers and minutes of the directors and shareholders in the nineteenth century are held by Archive Services at the University of Dundee as part of its Thornton Collection of Manuscripts and Plans.
