= Tudehope =

Tudehope is a surname. Notable people with the surname include:

- Damien Tudehope (born 1953), Australian politician
- David Tudehope, Australian physician
- Monica Tudehope (born 1985), Australian politician

== See also ==
- Tudhope, surname
