= Wormit =

Village in Scotland

Coordinates: 56°25′28″N 02°58′46″W

Wormit: Scottish Gaelic: Burmaid
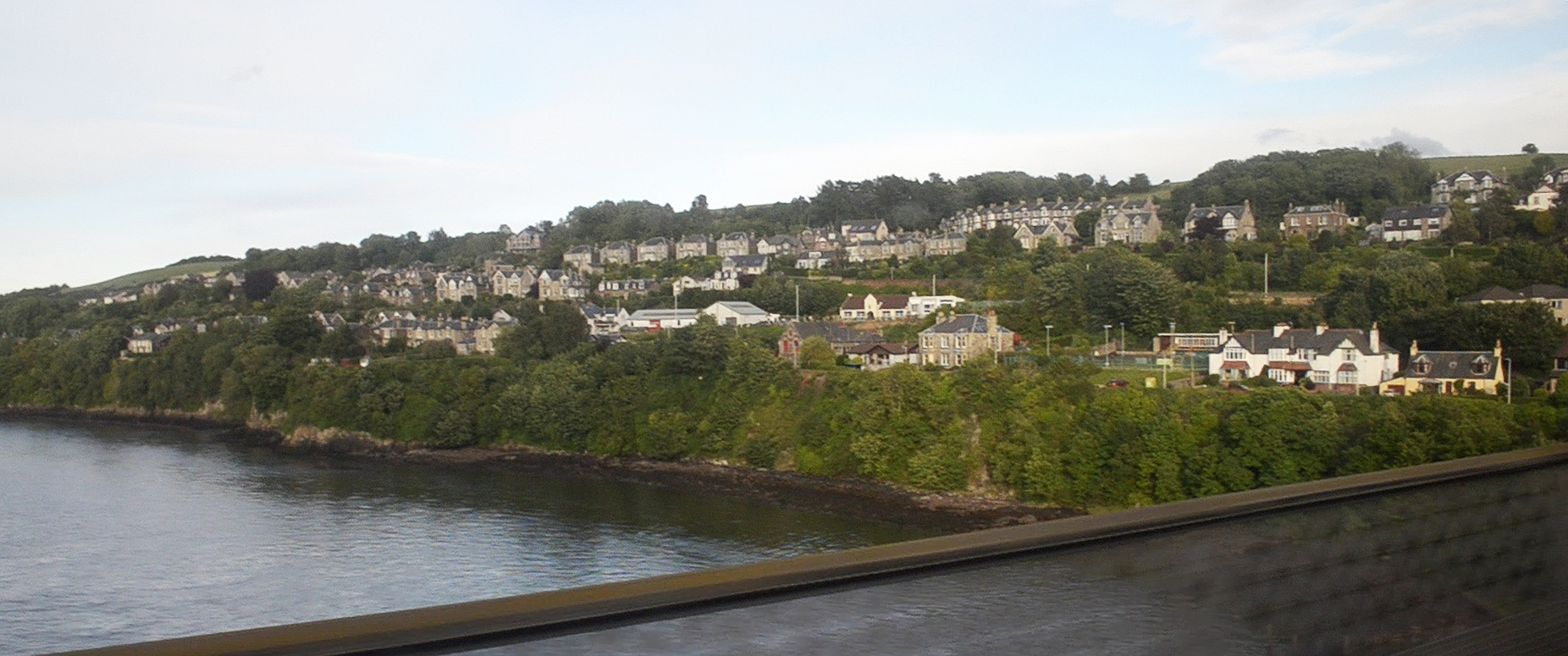
- Eastern part of Wormit seen from the Tay Rail Bridge

- Location within Fife Location near the Dundee City council area
- OS grid reference: NO3624
  - Edinburgh: 33 mi (53 km)
  - London: 359 mi (578 km)
- Council area: Fife
- Country: Scotland
- Sovereign state: United Kingdom
- Post town: Newport-on-Tay
- Postcode district: DD6
- Dialling code: 01382
- Police: Scotland
- Fire: Scottish
- Ambulance: Scottish
- UK Parliament: North East Fife
- Scottish Parliament: North East Fife

Wormit is a village on the south shore of the Firth of Tay in north-east Fife, Scotland. It is located at the southern end of the Tay Rail Bridge and together with Woodhaven and Newport-on-Tay, Wormit is a part of The Burgh of Newport-on-Tay. The name of the village is thought to be derived from the plant wormwood.

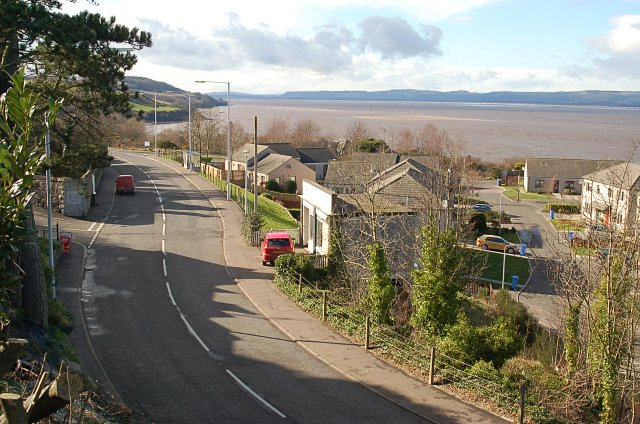
Wormit, by the old railway station

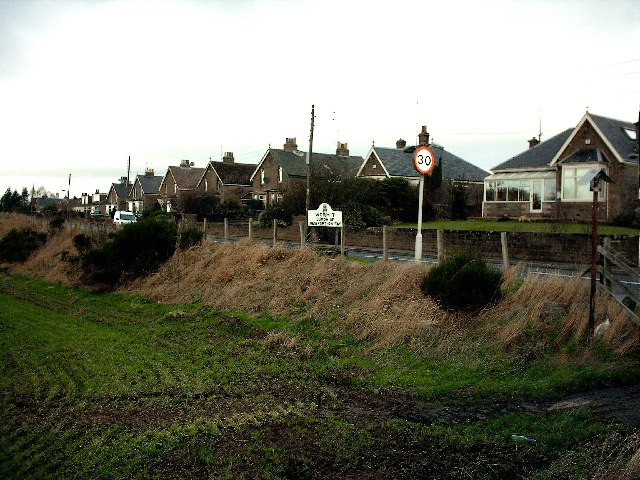
Entering Wormit from the South East via Kilmany Road.

== Wormit Station ==
Wormit Railway Station, opened on 1 May 1889 and closed on 5 May 1969, was operated on a closed branch line, The Newport Railway, which left the main line (Edinburgh/Dundee) railway immediately at the south end of the Bridge to serve Wormit/Newport. After closure, Wormit Station was later dismantled and rebuilt at the heritage Bo'ness and Kinneil Railway to the west of Edinburgh.

In 1955, there was a serious train crash in Wormit Station in which three people were killed and forty-one were injured.

== Power ==
Wormit claims to be the first Scottish village to have installed electricity. A windmill located on Wormit Hill generated the power, with a steam engine supplementing this when the wind was low. This was later replaced by a coal-gas engine until the 1930s, when Wormit was connected to the national grid. Alexander Stewart, who built many of Wormit's early houses, owned the windmill and steam engine and offered electrical lighting to homeowners as well as basic street lighting. Consumers paid 10 shillings a quarter and could use as much electricity as they liked. The first houses to have electricity had sun rays painted on the front, and these can still be seen along the highest row of terraced housing in the village.

== Norwegian connection ==
During the Second World War, King Haakon VII of Norway visited a house in Wormit used as a base by officers of the Norwegian Army. The soldiers painted a sea motif for the king on the walls of a bedroom, and it is still present in the house. Norwegian Catalina flying boats of No. 333 Squadron RNoAF were stationed at Woodhaven, Fife, and a Norwegian flag is still flown in the harbour, which has since been changed back into Wormit Boating Club, from where occasional pleasure sailings operate for much of the year upon the River Tay, mainly between the Tay Rail Bridge and Tay Road Bridge.

== Reservoir ==
Wormit water reservoir was built in 1923 in anticipation of the population of the town growing, but war intervened and the reservoir was eventually decommissioned due to costs. Trevor Cox, a professor of acoustic engineering at the University of Salford, identified the reservoir as one of the "strangest sounding places in the UK". It is a large concrete box 60 m (200 ft) long, 30 m (100 ft) wide and 5 m (16 ft) high. In a normal room, sounds die away quickly due to sound waves reflecting in to the walls, losing energy. In Wormit water reservoir, the size of the room means the time between reflections is much greater, coupled with sound waves losing less energy when reflecting off concrete, meaning sounds last for much longer. This was demonstrated by an experiment in which a balloon was popped inside the reservoir.

== Amenities and services ==
Wormit has its own primary school (established in 1896), church, blacksmith, garage, hair dresser, restaurant and local shop. The local secondary school is Madras College, St Andrews.

There are several sports clubs within Wormit, including tennis, bowling and boating clubs. Wormit Bowling Club was established in 1901; its clubhouse was built in 1955.

Wormit seen from Dundee Law.

== Notable residents ==
- John Meadows Jackson, FRSE (1907–1998), mathematician and physicist, lived here in the 1940s and 50s.
- Thomas Symington Halliday, MBE, FRSA (1902–1998), artist and sculptor, lived in Wormit for many years.
- Richard Gadd (1989–), actor, writer and comedian, was born in Wormit.
