= Joseph Lee (poet) =

Scottish journalist, artist and poet

- Born: Joseph Johnston Lee; 1876; Dundee, Scotland
- Died: 1949 (aged 72–73); Dundee, Scotland
- Occupations: Poet, journalist, artist, soldier
- Known for: War poetry

Joseph Johnston Lee (1876–1949) was a Scottish journalist, artist and poet, who chronicled life in the trenches and as a prisoner of war during World War I. He is also remembered for his dispute with then poet laureate Robert Bridges over the literary value of Robert Burns' work. He has been described as "Scotland's 'Forgotten' War Poet", as well as "Dundee's forgotten war poet."

== Biography ==
=== Early life and career ===
Born in Dundee, in 1876 Joseph Johnston Lee was the grandson of Sergeant David Lee, who had fought in the Napoleonic Wars, and was one of nine siblings. Lee began his working life at the age of 14. After a spell of employment in the office of a local solicitor, he went to sea as a steamship's stoker.

While working in Dundee had taken art classes at the local YMCA and by 1904 was working as an artist in London drawing cartoons for the Tariff Reform League, and subsequently became a newspaper artist. While in London he also studied at Heatherley's School of Fine Art. He returned to Dundee in 1906 and started to write for, produce and edit several local periodicals, most notably The City Echo and The Piper O' Dundee. In 1909 he founded and edited The Tocsin a monthly periodical which promoted the labour movement in Dundee and included contributions from Dundee's Labour MP Alexander Wilkie. This publication won praise from leading figures in the Labour Party including Keir Hardie and Philip Snowden, but folded after less than a year. These works also featured many illustrations by Lee, sometimes produced under the pseudonym 'Crowquill', such as cartoons of the then Dundee MP Winston Churchill.

In 1909 he gained employment with the Dundee newspaper and periodical publishers John Leng & Co. He was soon a regular contributor of poetry to their weekly newspaper The People's Journal, a publication which he would go on to edit. He published his first book of poems, Tales o’ Our Town, in 1910. In April 1914 his play Fra Lippo Lippi, Painter of Florence was produced and performed by students of the Dundee Technical College and School of Art. This was Lee's second theatrical work after a one-act play called The Song: An Episode from Bohemia, which was performed in Dundee in 1913.

Matthew Jarron notes that Lee was also in demand as an illustrator, with his drawings featuring in books including Dundee from the Tramcars (1908) and Lochee as It Was and as It Is (1911) as well as in his own Tales o’ Our Town.

=== World War One ===
Although he was aged almost 40 when World War I began, Lee enlisted in the 4th Battalion of the Black Watch, which was the territorial battalion for Dundee, in 1914 and eventually rose to the rank of Sergeant. He and eight other Dundee journalists who joined the battalion were dubbed 'Fighter-Writers'. Lee's enlistment was despite his age, health problems (he was suffering from asthma) and the fact many of his associates in the labour movement in Dundee strongly opposed the war. Caroline Brown, Matthew Jarron and Kenneth Baxter, have noted that it is possible Lee was inspired by the fact his grandfather had fought at Waterloo (Lee wrote a poem about this in 1915), or was swept up in a wave of patriotism which swept Dundee at this time. However, as they note, whatever his reasons were, it is unlikely he realised his involvement in the War would prove to be the key point of his literary career.

The 4th Black Watch were sent to France in 1915, and in that year took part in the battles of Aubers Ridge, Neuve Chapelle and Loos. During his time fighting, Lee sent sketches and poems back home to Scotland and became known as 'the Black Watch Poet'. These poems were eventually collected in two books of poetry, Ballads of Battle and Work-a-Day Warriors. In 1917 he gained a commission as a second lieutenant in the 10th Battalion of the King's Royal Rifle Corps. Later that year he was reported to be missing in action. In fact Lee had been captured and became a prisoner of war in Germany where he was held at camps at Karlsruhe and Beeskow. During his imprisonment, Lee kept journals in which he included sketches and other material. These journals were adapted into A Captive in Carlsruhe, a book which chronicled his time as a POW published in 1920.

=== Later life ===
In 1924 Lee married Miss Dorothy Barrie, who was a well-known viola player. The couple settled in Epsom and Lee became sub-editor on the News Chronicle. He also studied at the Slade School of Art during this period. From 1940 to 1944 he was a member of the Home Guard. He returned to Dundee in 1944, and died there in 1949.

== Music ==
Some of Lee's poems have been set to music. A musical score to accompany poems from 'Ballads of Battle' which had been set to music by Dundee musician J. F. Heyde (real name James H Foote) was published in 1916. This was followed in 1917 by 'Songs from Somewhere (5 further Ballads of Battle)' which was also set to a score by Heyde. A new musical version of Lee's poem 'The Listening Post', to a setting by Dallahan, was performed for the first time at a national commemorative event held in Dundee in 2015 to mark the 100th anniversary of the Battle of Loos.

== Reputation as a poet ==
Lee's war poetry was widely praised when it was published during the Great War. His poem The Green Grass was acclaimed by John Buchan as one of the best war poems he had read. In 1918 the New York Times described his work as 'rather widely quoted'. Lee's reputation as a war poet once ranked alongside those of Wilfred Owen, Siegfried Sassoon and Rupert Brooke. However, as the works of Owen and Sassoon grew in popularity, Lee's fame waned, and his poetry became neglected.

Lee's biographer Bob Burrows suggests that one reason why Lee's poetry failed to achieve the lasting recognition of that of his more famous contemporaries was because he did not have the backing of an influential supporter. He also notes that Lee came through the War relatively unscathed and returned to his old work as a journalist after his release from captivity in Germany. Burrows also suggests that Lee had no ambition to be a great literary figure and thus did little to push his work. In addition he puts forward the view that Lee's working class origins would have made it difficult for his work to achieve widespread acclaim.

Keith Williams notes that Lee's work is difficult to categorise as he was not explicitly anti-war, but nor was he 'a naive patriot'. He argues this is a key factor in explaining why Lee's poetry came to disappear from the 'post-Great War canon'.

== Reputation as an artist ==
Jarron argues that Lee was the artist who dominated Dundee's newspapers and magazines before the Great War. He also highlights the importance of Lee's war illustrations, drawn at the front and published with his poems, contenting that they were 'a major part of... [Ballads of Battle's] powerful sense of authenticity'. In 1915 Lee's art works were the subject of a full-page section in the People's Journal entitled "'Dundee's Own' Artist at the Front". During the War some of his sketches which were sent home were exhibited in the Albert Institute (now the McManus Galleries) in Dundee.

When in London after the First World War Lee is known to have sketched many famous figures that he encountered including Edward Elgar, Max Beerbohm and Edith Sitwell.

== Legacy ==
Joseph Lee's papers are now held by Archive Services at the University of Dundee. They include Lee's correspondence with Robert Bridges as well as material relating to his time as a prisoner of war. The collection also features copies of Lee's publications and material relating to them, including a letter from Keir Hardie. Over 250 of Lee's drawings (including ones sketched while a prisoner of war in Germany) are held by the University of Dundee Museum Services. An exhibition devoted to Lee was held at the University of Dundee in 2005 and was opened by his great niece. In 2011 materials from Lee's papers, including extracts from the diary he wrote during his spell as a prisoner of war, were featured in an exhibition held by Archive Services to mark Remembrance Day. Another major exhibition of Lee's work was held in the university from August to November 2016.

A biography of Lee, by Bob Burrows, was published in 2004.

The University of Dundee holds a 1921 portrait of Lee by Henry Young Alison and a 1913 lithograph portrait by Stewart Carmichael. Another portrait of Lee, by David Foggie is held by the Dundee Art Galleries and Museums Collection.

== Publications ==
- Lee's first major collection of poetry, Tales o’ Our Town (Dundee: George Montgomery, 1910), features around sixty poems, most of which relate to people, places and events in his native Dundee. The volume also contains illustrations drawn by Lee.
- His first collection of war poetry, Ballads of Battle (London: John Murray, 1916), contains 38 poems and 17 illustrations drawn by Lee.
- Work-A-Day Warriors (London: John Murray, 1917) contains 39 poems, including four which had previously been published in The Spectator and one, "The Carrion Crow", which had earlier been published in The Nation. As with his earlier works, this volume also contains drawings by Lee. The New York Times regretted Lee's choice of title for this volume, as it felt it failed "to convey the real depth of Mr. Lee’s work".
- A Captive at Carlsruhe and other German prison camps (London: John Lane, 1920) is the published account of Lee's time as a prisoner of war and is based on the journals he kept while a prisoner of war.
- A new volume of Lee's War poetry was launched at the University of Dundee in October 2014.
