= Sons of England War Memorial =

Monument in Toronto, Ontario, Canada

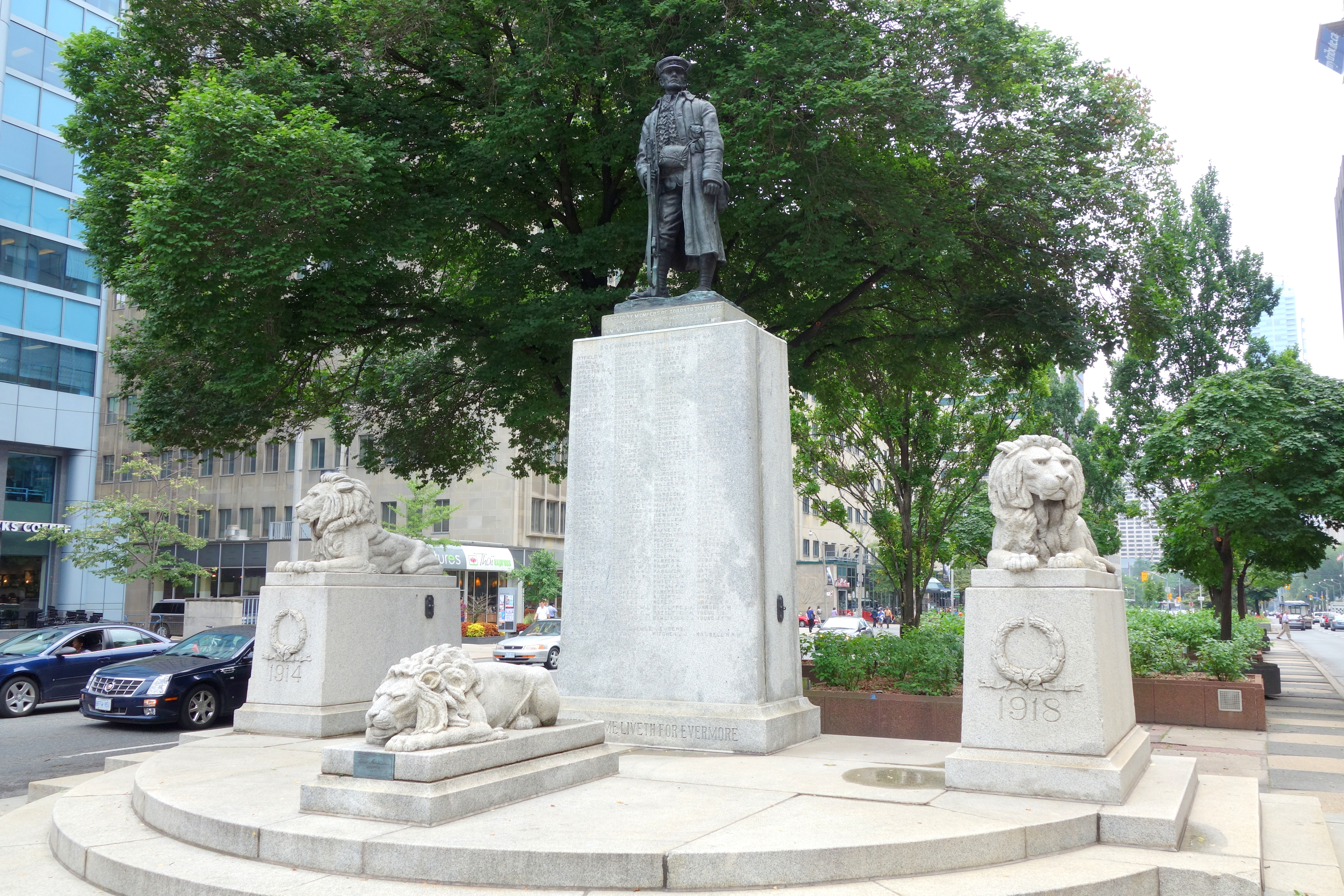
- The memorial in 2013
- Interactive map of Sons of England War Memorial
- Location: Toronto, Ontario, Canada
- Coordinates: 43°39′22.1″N 79°23′20″W

The Sons of England War Memorial is installed at the intersection of University Avenue and Elm Street in downtown Toronto, in Ontario, Canada. The statue was designed by Charles Adamson.
