= Wormit railway station =

Disused railway station in Wormit, Fife

Wormit
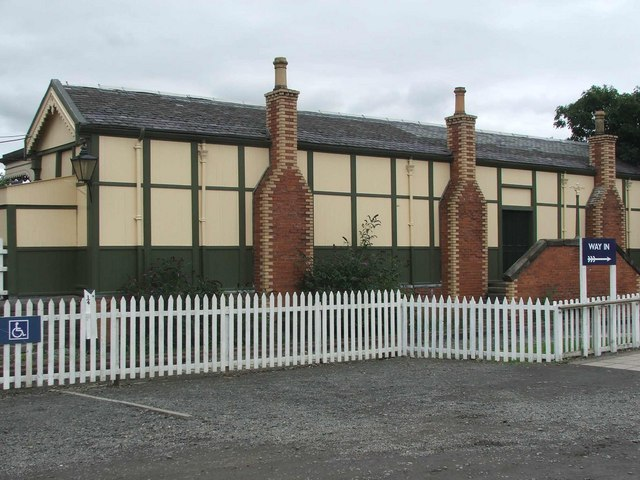
- The station building at the preservation site in 2007

General information
- Location: Wormit, Fife; Scotland
- Coordinates: 56.4252°N 2.9811°W
- Grid reference: NO395263
- Platforms: 2

Other information
- Status: Disused

History
- Original company: Newport Railway
- Pre-grouping: Newport Railway; North British Railway
- Post-grouping: LNER

Key dates
- 1 May 1889: Opened
- 5 May 1969: Closed
Location

Wormit railway station served the town of Wormit, Fife, Scotland from 1889 to 1969 on the Newport Railway.

== History ==
The station opened on 1 May 1889 by the Newport Railway. In 1955 a train crash occurred where 3 people were killed and 41 were injured, 15 with severe injuries. The station closed to both passengers and goods traffic on 5 May 1969.
