= Frank Laing =

Scottish painter and etcher

Seaside Stroll by Frank Laing

Frank Laing (born Francis James Laing; 1862–1907) was a Scottish painter and etcher. He is best known for his watercolours and etchings of European landscapes and architectural subjects. Born in Tayport, Fife, Laing lived and worked throughout Europe, producing a portfolio of notable work from Spain, Paris, Chartres, Antwerp and Venice before returning to Scotland.

An elected Associate of the Royal Society of Painter-Etchers and Engravers, his etchings were commended by noted American artist and etcher, James Abbott McNeill Whistler, who he was a follower of. He exhibited widely, including at the Royal Academy (RA), Royal Scottish Academy (RSA) and the Paris Salon. In 1900 he won a jury commendation at the Paris Exposition Universelle.

While most of his work is held in private collections, there are examples to be found in the Fitzwilliam Museum, Cambridge, Dundee Art Galleries and Museums Collection, the Aberdeen Art Gallery, and the University of Dundee’s Fine Art collection.

Along with Alec Grieve, Laing founded the Tayport Artists’ Circle in 1905. Its other members included noted Scottish painters David Foggie, Stewart Carmichael and James Douglas. Laing was active in promoting the cause of local Scottish artists and arts groups before dying at the relatively young age of 45.
