= Charles Adamson (sculptor) =

Scottish-Canadian sculptor (1880–1959)

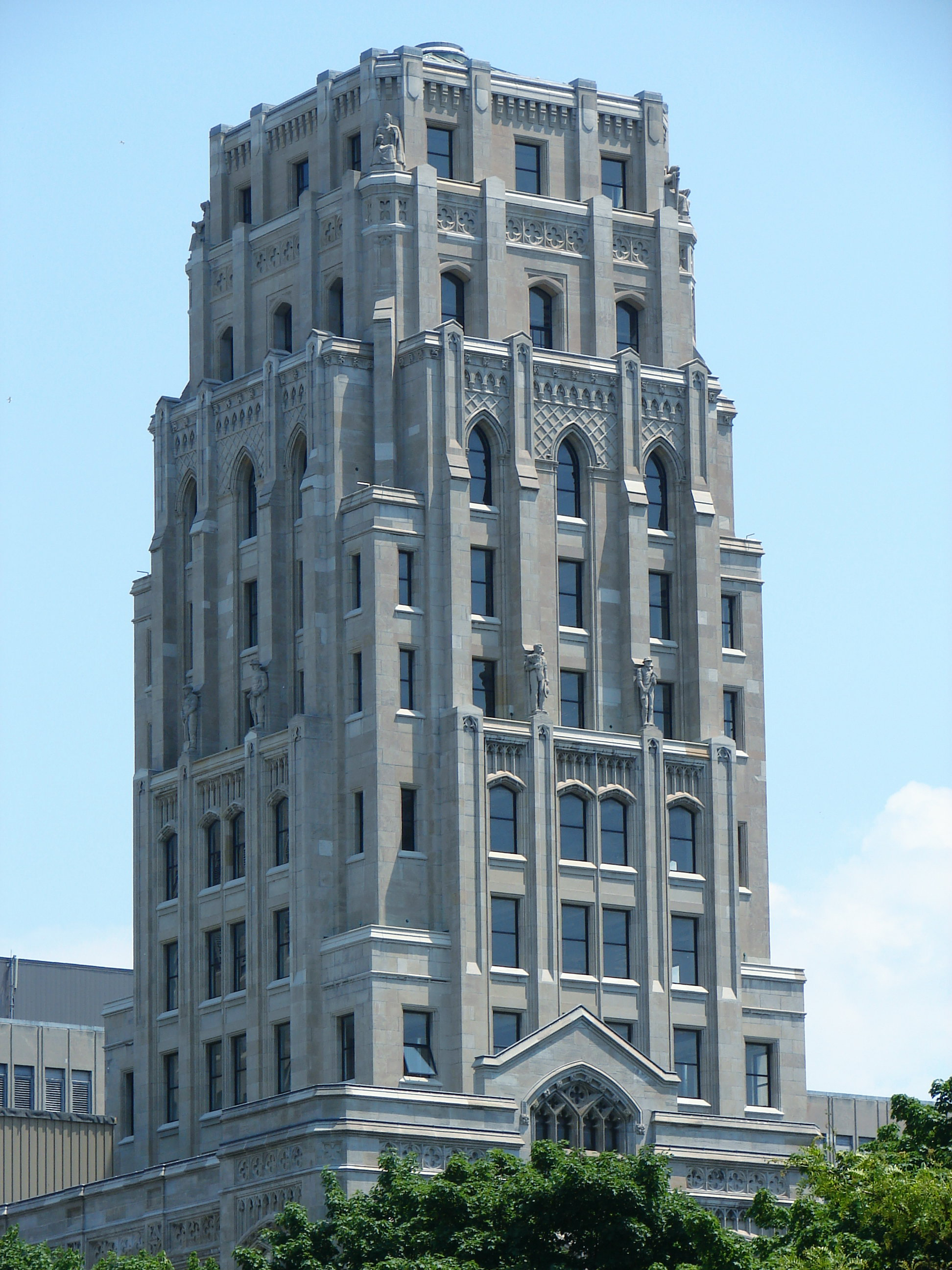
The tower of Toronto's Whitney Block, with figures by Adamson on two levels

Charles Adamson (1880 — 13 February 1959) was a Scottish-born Canadian sculptor.

Adamson was born in Dundee, Scotland. He served in the Corps of Canadian Railway Troops in World War I. His army record shows that he was married with six children and living in Toronto when he enlisted in 1917.

He created the sculptures for the tower which was added in 1932 to the Whitney Block government building in Toronto. At the top of the tower there are four female "guardians", while at mid-height there are eight male figures representing occupations: a judge and a professor on the east, a labourer and a miner on the north, a farmer and a lumberjack on the west, and a businessman and a doctor, plus a small boy looking up at the doctor, on the south. He also created the bronze soldier and stone lions for the Sons of England War Memorial in Toronto, on University Avenue at Elm Street.

His bust of Scottish painter William Bradley Lamond is held in the collection of the McManus Gallery in Dundee.
