= William Mackay Mackenzie =

British historian

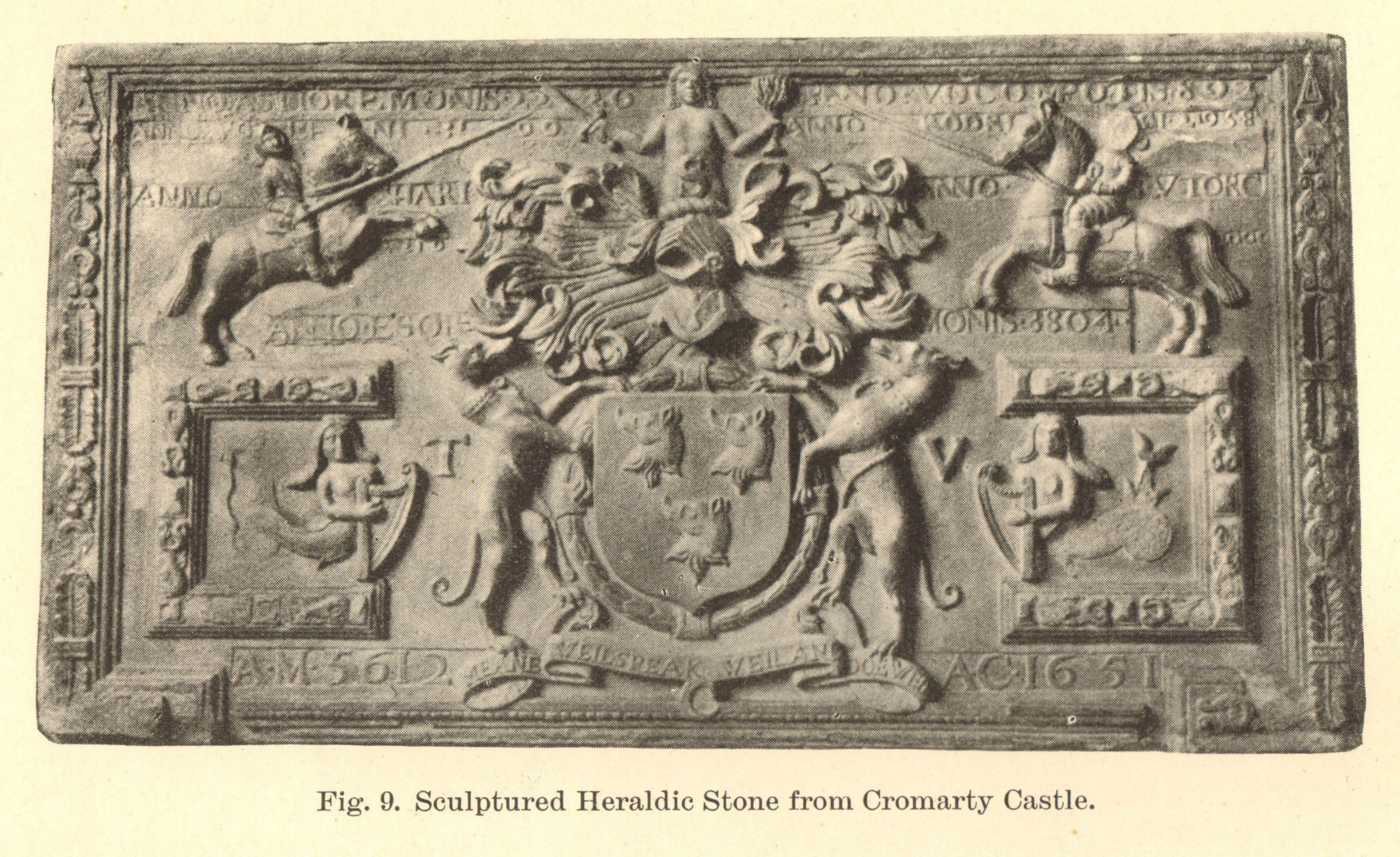
Sculptured heraldic stone from Cromarty Castle (demolished 1772). From Mackenzie Some Stray Inscriptions (1927)

William Mackay Mackenzie HRSA FSA Scot (1871–1952) was a Scottish historian, archaeologist and writer, who was Secretary of the Royal Commission on Ancient and Historical Monuments of Scotland between 1913 and 1935, and also an expert on folk-lore. He was born in Cromarty, graduated with an MA from the University of Edinburgh and taught at Glasgow Academy between 1896 and 1912. Mackenzie received a PhD from the University of Edinburgh in 1929. He also had a DLitt.

William Mackay Mackenzie was married to Isabella Jane Mackenzie (1869–1955) in Stornoway, Isle of Lewis on 10 April 1901.

In 1925–1926, he was Rhind lecturer in archaeology at the University of Edinburgh and during the Second World War acted as head of the department of Ancient Scottish History. In 1942 he was appointed to be a member of the Commission where he had formerly been Secretary. He was a Fellow of the Society of Antiquaries of London (FSA) and was made an honorary Doctor of Laws in 1949 at Edinburgh. As well as writing on medieval history, he published a major edition of Dunbar's poems. His younger brother, Donald Alexander Mackenzie, was also a prolific writer on religion, mythology and anthropology.

He died in Inverness in 1952.

== Public Recognition ==
A portrait of Mackenzie by David Foggie, painted in 1914, is held by the National Gallery of Scotland but is rarely displayed.

A portrait photograph of Mackenzie by Inverness photographer Andrew Paterson is held by the National Gallery of Scotland (Accession No. PGP EPS 539.5). Paterson achieved success with the photograph in 1930 at the open exhibition held by he Edinburgh Photographic Society (Northern Chronicle and General Advertiser for the North of Scotland, 12 February 1930).

== Bibliography ==
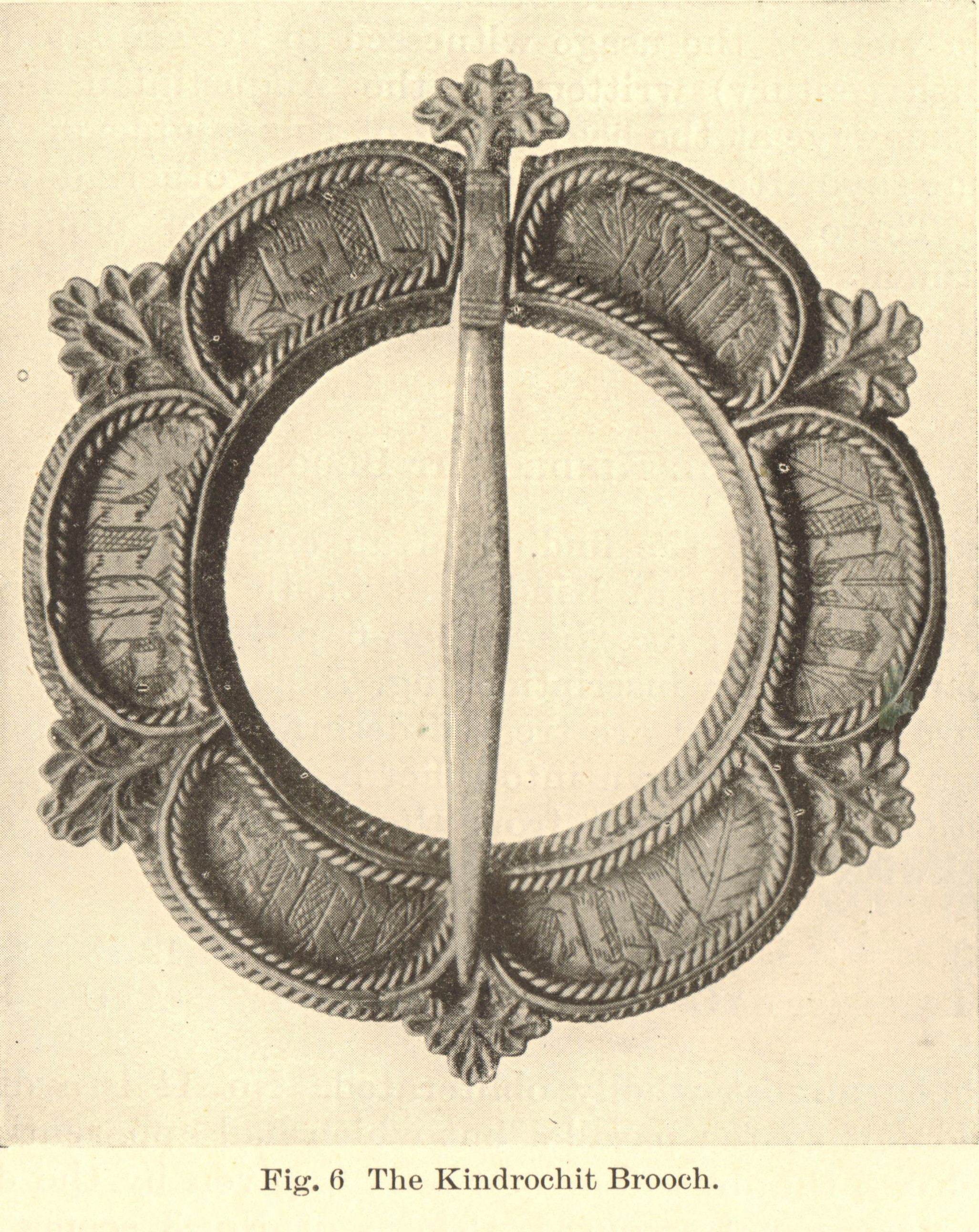
The Kindrochit Brooch. From Mackenzie Some stray inscriptions (1927)

- Mackenzie, William Mackay (1905). Hugh Miller: A Critical Study. Hodder and Stoughton. OCLC 10797545.
- —— (1907). Outline of Scottish History: From Roman Times to the Disruption. Adam and Charles Black. OCLC 1064794666.
- —— (1910). Pompeii. Painted by Alberto Pisa, Described by W.M. Mackenzie. Adam and Charles Black. OCLC 1000337363.
- —— (1913). The Battle of Bannockburn: A Study in Mediaeval Warfare. J. MacLehose. OCLC 1017268017.
- —— (1927). The Mediaeval Castle in Scotland: (Rhind lectures in archaeology, 1925 - 26). Methuen & Company Limited. OCLC 1008315489.
- —— (1927). "Some Stray Inscriptions - (1) Runes on Standing Stone at Oykell Bridge;(2) on Bracket at Gleneagles;(3) on the Kindrochit Brooch;(4) the Atholl Motto;(5) Two Carved Stones of the Urquharts of Cromarty". Proceedings of the Society of Antiquaries of Scotland. 61: 173–191. doi:10.9750/PSAS.061.173.191.
- —— (1934). "Clay Castle-Building in Scotland". Proceedings of the Society of Antiquaries of Scotland. 68: 117–127. doi:10.9750/PSAS.068.117.127.
- —— (1949). The Scottish Burghs: An Expanded Version of the Rhind Lectures in Archaeology for 1945. Oliver and Boyd.
- ——, ed. (1932). The poems of William Dunbar. Edinburgh: The Porpoise Press.
