= John Maclauchlan Milne =

Scottish artist

John Maclauchlan Milne RSA (1885–1957) was a Scottish painter much associated with the Dundee artistic community of the early 20th Century, but who also spent much time abroad particularly in the South of France. He was essentially a landscape painter, although urban paintings often occur. His works are found in many public art galleries, especially in Scotland.

== Life ==
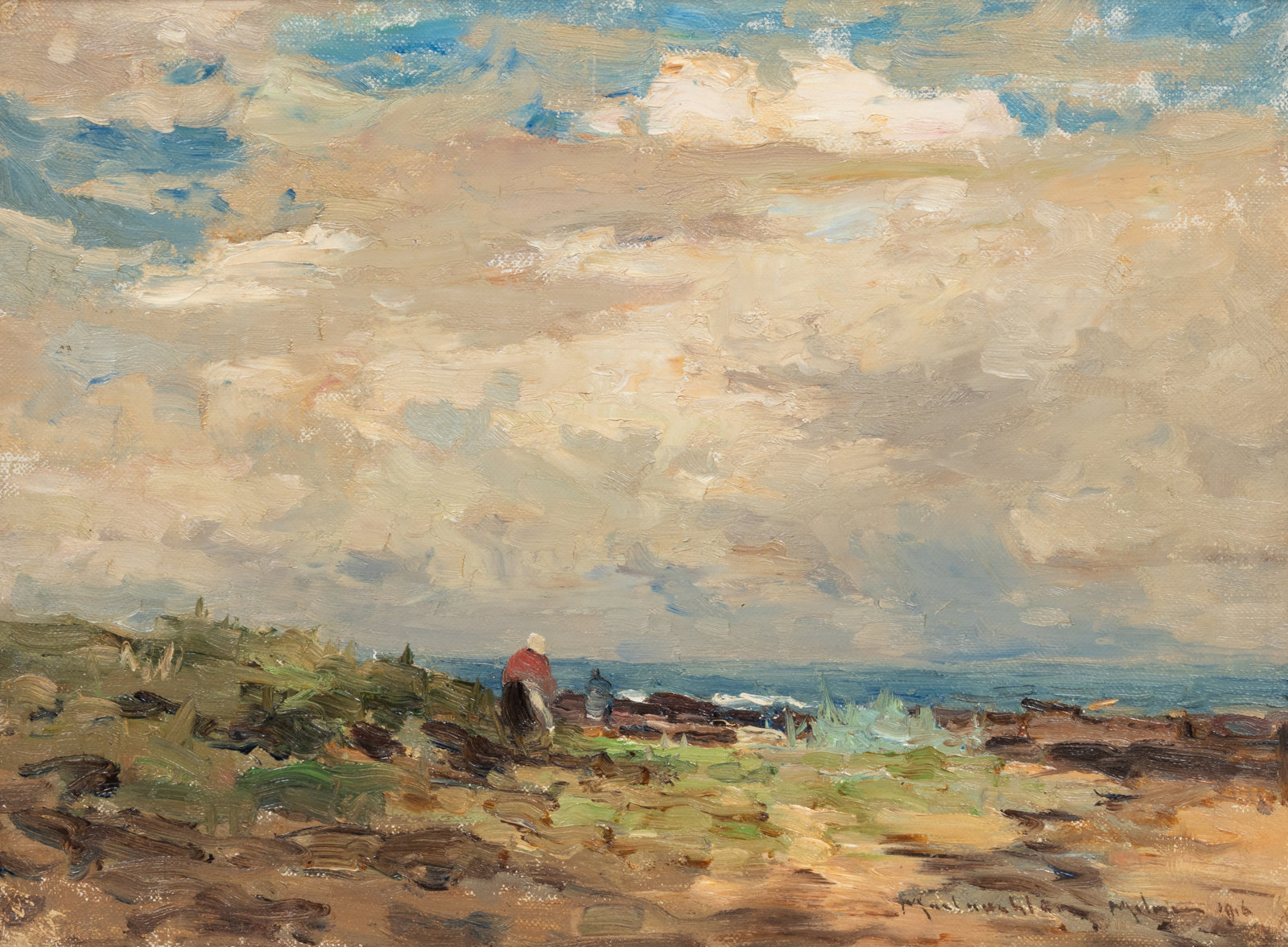
Along the Shore, 1916, an early work by John Maclauchlan Milne painted in a 'traditional' manner

Maclauchlan Milne was born in Buckhaven in Fife, the first of four children. His father, Joseph Milne was also a landscape painter. The family lived in Edinburgh, where he went to school. Maclauchlan Milne emigrated to Canada in 1903 before rejoining his family in London in 1907. They returned to Scotland and Dundee in 1908. He married his wife in 1911 and thereafter travelled considerably while maintaining a studio in Dundee at 132A Nethergate, Dundee, for some twenty years. The patronage of art collectors in Dundee gave him financial support, enabling him in the 1920s to visit the South of France. He settled in Arran in the early 1940s, dying in Greenock in October 1957.

== Art ==
Maclauchlan Milne was initially much influence by his Father, Joseph (Joe) Milne (d.1911) and his uncle William Watt Milne (d. 1949) who were both professional artists. This can be seen in his painting Fife Landscape, which is very much in the manner of his father. However, a visit to Paris in 1920 changed his outlook and style. After seeing the works of Cézanne he embraced the Modernist and a somewhat Impressionistic style of painting and thereafter worked in that manner. He adopted a far bolder colour palette, very much in tune with the French artists he observed.

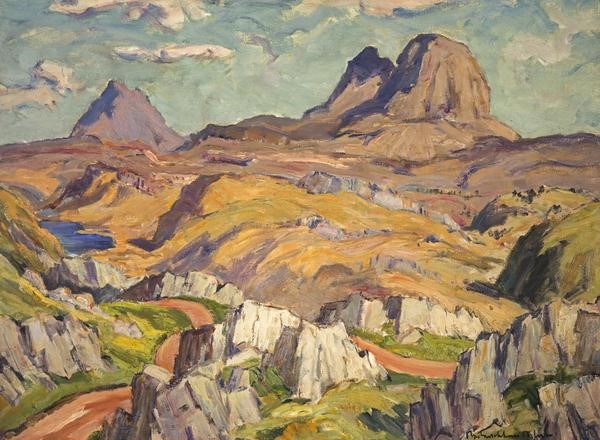
Landscape, Sutherland, circa 1930 - 35 by John Maclauchlan Milne in his mature manner

He was also in direct contact with Peploe, Fergusson, Cadell and Hunter, the ‘Scottish Colourists’, including exhibiting with them in Dundee in 1924, and no doubt took some inspiration from them. He also painted in Iona which he would have associated with the works of Cadell and Peploe, although he may have only visited the island several times in the late 1930s. He continued to paint on Arran, his Scottish paintings often showing a brightness of colour not always associated with the Scottish landscape.

== Legacy ==
Milne seems to have been greatly appreciated in his day. The Dundee collector, Matthew Justice for example had his sitting room hung exclusively with paintings by Milne and Peploe. Several other important Dundee collectors owned his works. He has often been compared to the four Scottish Colourists, but has never achieved the level of recognition accorded to those artists. Professionally, he was recognised by being elected an Associate of the RSA in 1933 and a full RSA in 1937.
