= John Meadows Jackson =

British mathematician

Dr John Meadows Jackson FRSE FIMA FRAS (1907–1998) was a British mathematician.

== Life ==
He was born in Chorlton-cum-Hardy on the edge of Manchester on 8 February 1907. His mother died during his birth and he was raised by his grandparents. He was educated at Manchester Grammar School having won a scholarship on the basis of his intellect.

He obtained two BSc degrees at the University of London: Physics in 1927 and Mathematics in 1928. He won a further scholarship, enabling him to undertake postgraduate studies at Trinity College, Cambridge, under Sir Nevill Mott where he obtained a PhD in Physics in 1933. He then took a job as Assistant Lecturer at Manchester University. He began lecturing in Mathematics at Westfield College in London in 1937. At that time the college was exclusively for women.

His career was interrupted by the Second World War. Westfield College was relocated to Oxfordshire in 1939 to avoid bombing. In 1941 he was seconded to the Mine Design Department of the Admiralty based in Helensburgh. The department later relocated to Fettes College in Edinburgh where he worked on the design of mine-sweeping equipment. At the end of the war the family decided not to return to London but to stay in Scotland. In January 1946 he began lecturing in Mathematics at University College, Dundee, initially living with his family in Wormit in Fife on the opposite side of the Tay estuary. He was elected a Fellow of the Royal Society of Edinburgh in 1947. His proposers were Edward Copson, George Dawson Preston, Robert Campbell Garry, and Robert Percival Cook.

He retired in 1974 and died at his home, the Cedars on Perth Road in Dundee, on 23 March 1998.

== Family ==
In 1940 he was married to Pat Harris, a lecturer in Chemistry whom he had met at a conference in 1938. They had three daughters: Kathleen, Esther and Margaret.

== Publications ==
- Energy Exchange between a Gas and a Solid Surface (1937)
