= Newport-on-Tay East railway station =

Former railway station in Fife, Scotland

Coordinates: 56.4406°N 2.9348°W

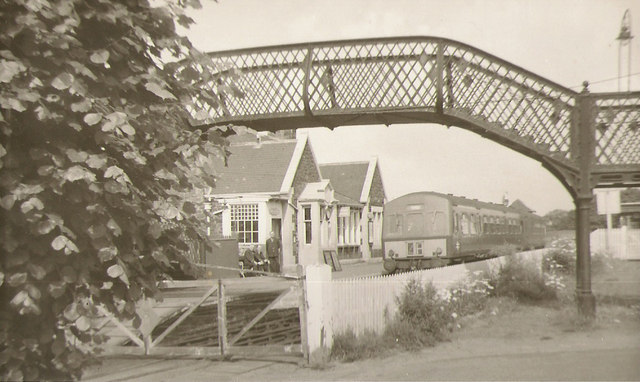
Newport-on-Tay East railway station, 1968

Newport-on-Tay East railway station formerly served the town of Newport-on-Tay, Fife, Scotland. The station closed in 1969.

== Tayport branch ==
Newport-on-Tay East station was opened by North British Railway on 13 May 1879 with a branch line from the southern end of the Tay Bridge which was later extended to Tayport. In 1923 it became the LNER and from 1948 the Scottish Region of British Railways. The line was single track but with passing places at Wormit station and the second was at Newport-on-Tay East. The single platform Newport-on-Tay West railway station was much smaller.

== Description ==
The East station had two platforms which were curved slightly to follow the line of the track. At the end nearest Station Road there was a level crossing and a pedestrian bridge. The main ticket office, and the stationmaster's house were situated on the up track (towards Tayport). On the down track, there was only a waiting room. The station was lit by gas lamps, which were activated by the station staff. The signal box was situated at the far end of the Eastbound platform, and the signalmen used to hand the pouches containing the tokens for the stretch of track to Tayport from a platform situated on the stair leading up to the signal box.

The strip of land between the up track and Norwood Terrace contained allotments. The land on the other side of the main tracks was taken up by a goods yard. Two coal merchants had their premises here. There was also an additional spur of track leading to a ramp which was used for loading sugar beet. At harvest time, tractors loaded with beet would drive in and tip the contents of their trailers into railway waggons parked on this spur.

The station layout shown on the 1914 Ordnance Survey map remained practically unchanged till it closed.

There were two accidents in the station. In one case, a train hit one of the level crossing gates, and it had to be replaced. The other accident was more serious. A workman was killed during an accident while shunting coal waggons.

== Opening of the Tay Road Bridge ==
The railway was mainly used by people who lived in Newport and worked in Dundee. Until the opening of the Tay Road Bridge in 1966 the Tay Ferry provided the only alternative means of getting there. The opening of the Road Bridge allowed direct bus services from Newport to Dundee, as well as easy access by car, thus directly leading to the closure of the line in 1969.

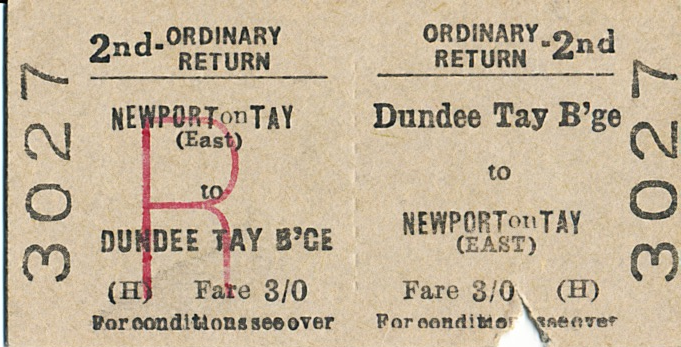
A return ticket for the train service from Dundee to Newport-on-Tay purchased on 3 May 1969.

During the 1960s the trains were normally pulled by British Railways 2-6-4T engines. Later the steam trains were replaced by diesel multiple units, probably British Rail Class 101.
