= George Ranken Tudhope =

20th-century Scottish pathologist and medical author

George Ranken Tudhope MD FRSE DPH (1893–1955) was a 20th-century Scottish pathologist and medical author.

The George Ranken Tudhope Prize for best student in Pathology at the University of Dundee is named in his honour.

== Life ==
He was born on 7 July 1893 in Newport-on-Tay in Fife the son of George Tudhope. He was educated at the High School of Dundee.

He studied medicine at the University of St Andrews, graduating MB ChB in 1918. From 1919 to 1955 he taught pathology at University College, Dundee, then a constituent college of St Andrews.

He was elected a Fellow of the Royal Society of Edinburgh in 1947. His proposers were Robert Campbell Garry, Edward Thomas Copson, Robert Percival Cook and Alexander David Peacock.

He was President of the Forfarshire Medical Association 1954/55.

He died suddenly in Dundee on 13 December 1955 aged 62.

== Family ==
In 1922 he married Elizabeth Florence McCombe (d.1946). In 1949 he married Christian Johnston Bissett.

From his first marriage he was father to his namesake George Ranken Tudhope (1924–1998) who also had an eminent career as a doctor.

== Publications ==
- Thyroid and the Blood (1969) - ISBN 9780433328308
