= Leuchars (Old) railway station =

Disused railway station in Leuchars, Fife

Coordinates: 56.38213°N 2.88732°W

Leuchars (Old)

General information
- Location: Leuchars, Fife; Scotland
- Platforms: 4

Other information
- Status: Disused

History
- Original company: Edinburgh and Northern Railway
- Pre-grouping: North British Railway

Key dates
- 17 May 1848: Opened as Leuchars
- 1 July 1852: Name changed to Leuchars Junction
- 1 June 1878: Closed
- 1 December 1878: Reopened as Leuchars (Old)
- 3 October 1921: Closed
Location

Leuchars (Old) railway station served the town of Leuchars, Fife, Scotland, from 1848 to 1921 on the Edinburgh and Northern Railway.

== History ==
The station opened on 17 May 1848 as Leuchars by the Edinburgh and Northern Railway. To the south was a small goods yard and to the north was the signal box, next to the level crossing. The name of the station was changed to Leuchars Junction on 1 July 1852. It closed on 1 June 1878 when the new station opened but it reopened on 1 December 1878 as Leuchars (Old). It closed permanently on 3 October 1921.

| Preceding station | Disused railways | Following station |
|---|---|---|
| Tayport; Line and station closed | Edinburgh and Northern Railway | Leuchars; Line closed, station open |
