= David Foggie =

Scottish painter (1878–1948)

- Self-portrait by Foggie
- Born: 31 December 1878; Dundee, Scotland
- Died: 2 June 1948 (aged 69); Dundee, Scotland

David Foggie RSA (31 December 1878 Dundee – 2 June 1948), was a Scottish painter, born to parents James and Margaret Foggie.

By the time of his death, David Foggie was a known name across Scotland. Since that time he had sunk into obscurity, but enjoyed a revival in popularity with the 2004 Dundee exhibition of an extensive collection of his work. Foggie's works are found in the National Galleries of Scotland, the Royal Scottish Academy, and many public and private collections.

Foggie started his studies at the Dundee School of Art in 1887, where 10 years later he was appointed Pupil Assistant and joined the Dundee Graphic Arts Association. The following year he left for Belgium, where he studied at the Antwerp Academy. On his return in 1904 he built a house at Lucklawhill overlooking Leuchars and Balmullo in Fife, and in the following year helped found the Tayport Artists Circle.

In 1920 he took a post teaching at Edinburgh College of Art.

== Public or Notable Works ==
see

- A Fisherrow Fishwife, East Lothian Council Collection
- Forfouchten (Tired Out), Dundee Art Gallery and Museum
- Dreams, City Art Centre, Edinburgh
- Lady Darling, Paisley Art Gallery and Museum
- William Mackay Mackenzie, 1914, National Gallery of Scotland
- Joseph Lee, War Poet (1876-1949), 1921, Dundee Art Gallery and Museum
- Portrait of the Artist's Wife, 1922, Dundee Art Gallery and Museum
- Sir James Key Caird, 1929, Dundee University (based on a famous photograph - painted posthumously)
- Interlude, 1935, Aberdeen Art Gallery and Museum
- Grandmother Knits, 1943, Glasgow Museums
- Self Portrait, 1945, Scottish National Portrait Gallery
