= William Bradley Lamond =

Scottish painter (1857–1924)

William Bradley Lamond RBA (1857–1924) was a Scottish painter, born at Newtyle, Angus. He had no formal art training and worked for the Caledonian Railway company for many years. He initially specialised in portraits and later worked on landscapes which have been described as "vigorous impressionistic scenes in oil – with a strong use of colour". He was elected a member of the Royal Society of British Artists in 1906, and exhibited at the Royal Academy, Royal Scottish Academy and Glasgow Institute of the Fine Arts.

== Early work ==
William Bradley Lamond first publicly exhibited his work at Dunfermline's Fine Art Exhibition in 1883, followed by the Dundee Fine Art Exhibition in 1884. Five years later he showed at the Royal Scottish Academy for the first time with the painting A Mile Abune Dundee. In 1890 he became one of the founding members of the Dundee Graphic Arts Association and had work shown at Robert Scott's gallery in the city.

His first notable commission came the following year – a presentation portrait of Sgt Major Kilgour of the Dundee Highlanders. Around 1894, he hit on one of his most profitable subjects – shore scenes featuring seaweed gatherers at work with horse and cart. He showed one such scene at Scott's which the Evening Telegraph hailed alliteratively as "a brilliant bit of brightsome work". It was soon bought by a local collector and Lamond painted many more variations on the same theme, including A Breezy Day (1896).

== Later work ==
In 1895 he had his most successful year yet, showing at the Glasgow Institute and the RSA and ending with an exhibition of paintings and sketches in his studio at 61 Reform Street. Although Lamond eschewed modern art, his compositions were often regarded as distinctive due to his preference for capturing particular effects rather than selecting subject matter because of its social or symbolic meaning, in contrast to other Dundee painters such as John Duncan or Stewart Carmichael.

In 1898, 60 of his paintings were auctioned by William Fyfe at the City Assembly Rooms, fetching prices of up to 19 guineas. In 1900 he showed at the Royal Academy for the first time, and soon began to cultivate a London audience. In 1902 he opened his first one-man show in London, at Clifford's Gallery in Haymarket. Although many Dundee illustrators and cartoonists had enjoyed success in London (such as Martin Anderson and Max Cowper), the city's painters had rarely made such an impact in the capital.

Lamond returned to London in 1903 to undertake a number of commissions and later that year was elected a member of the Royal Society of British Artists, recognised as "a painter of strength, with a true eye for colour harmonies and a special aptitude for interpreting the beauties of northern landscape and coast scenery".

He continued to show work at the exhibitions of the RBA, RSA, Glasgow Institute and GAA, but in 1906 his health broke down and he withdrew from all of these.

By summer 1908 Lamond was back in Dundee, where he held an exhibition of his latest work in his new studio at 3 Constitution Road; the following year he moved to 27 Bank Street where he would remain for the rest of his life. In 1915 he gained a celebrity patron in the person of music hall legend Harry Lauder, who commissioned two paintings from him and visited him periodically in either Dundee or Auchmithie.

== Later life and death ==
During the Great War, Lamond continued to paint as much as ever, spending his summers in Auchmithie then showing the results in exhibitions in his studio each autumn.

Lamond died of pneumonia in 1924 at his home in William Street. He died intestate, and following an exhibition in his studio to try to sell off his remaining paintings, a memorial exhibition was held at the Victoria Galleries in 1925, featuring 68 works loaned by various collectors, along with numerous paintings donated by his fellow artists in order to raise money to provide for his widow and to erect a stone over his grave in the Eastern cemetery.

A bust of Lamond by the sculptor Charles Adamson is now in Dundee's Art Galleries & Museums' collections.
