= Logie, Fife =

Coordinates: 56°22′20″N 2°58′00″W

Logie (Scottish Gaelic: An Lagan) is a parish and village in east Fife, Scotland, 5 miles north-east of Cupar.

The parish is bounded on the east by the parish of Leuchars, on the south by Dairsie, on the west and north by Kilmany and at its northern tip by a short border with Forgan. Its length is 4½ miles from north-east to south-west and it is 1–1 ½ miles wide.

It contains the hamlet of Lucklawhill.

The civil parish has a population of 243 and its area is 3603 acres. Its Community Council is Balmerino, Gauldry, Kilmany and Logie.

The estate of Logie on the south side of the parish belonged to Sir John Wemyss, ancestor of the Earls of Wemyss in the reign of Robert III of Scotland and subsequently passed to a junior branch of the family.

The parish church was built in 1826 and restored in 1882. A previous church was mentioned in 1275, but in 1590 was so dilapidated that it had to be rebuilt. The church was dedicated to St Luag and belonged to Balmerino Abbey prior to the Reformation. In 1972 the congregation of Logie, which sat within the Presbytery of Cupar, was dissolved.

The story of the young laird John Wemyss of Logie who was arrested and imprisoned in Dalkeith Palace in August 1592 but escaped with the help of his Danish girlfriend Margaret Vinstarr is told in the ballad, The Laird o Logie. The lands of Logie passed to Andrew Wemyss, Lord Myrecairnie.
