= Archibald Wauchope of Niddrie =

Scottish landowner

Archibald Wauchope of Niddrie (c. 1565 – 1597) was a Scottish landowner and rebel.

== Family background ==
He was the son of Robert Wauchope of Niddrie, who died in 1598, and Margaret Dundas, daughter of James Dundas of Dundas. He was known as the "Laird of Niddrie, younger". The Wauchope lands were at Niddrie, Edinburgh, also called "Niddrie-Merschell".

== Career ==
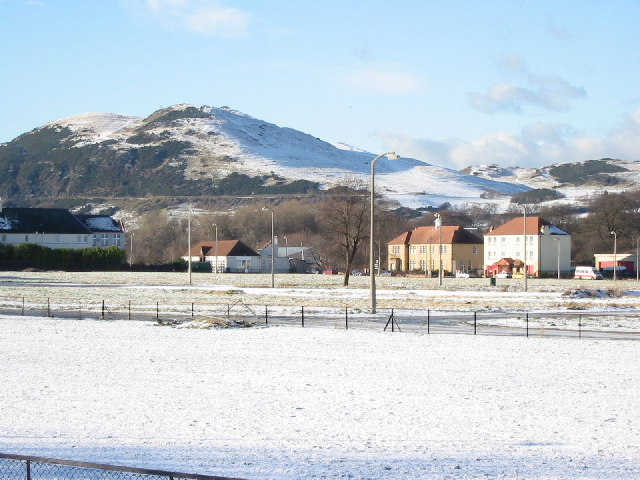
Niddrie, Edinburgh

In 1580 at Peffermill, Wauchope and his servant Joseph Reidpath killed Gilbert Home, a servant of John Bothwell, Abbot of Holyrood, who had criticised him for hitting an officer-at-arms. The Home family accepted Wauchope's humiliation and repentance.

In 1588 Wauchope and his father were involved in the murders of James and John Giffart of Sherriffhall, Robert Caise in Dalkeith, and John Edmonstone, brother of the Laird of Woolmet. He was captured at Bridgend on 12 May 1589 by Andrew Edmonstone, after a short siege was ended by James VI, and brought to Edinburgh. James Sandilands of Slamannan helped Wauchope escape from a window of Edinburgh's Tolbooth in May 1589. Despite this, Sandilands soon regained royal favour. The king remained angry with Wauchope, and in May 1590 interrupted a ceremony where he was riding with his bride Anne of Denmark on the sands at Leith in view of the ships of the departing Danish ambassadors, and rode off to try and capture the laird.

In January 1591 he was accused of adultery with the wife of George Preston of Craigmillar. Preston tried to get a divorce but Wauchope's ally the Earl of Bothwell prevented Preston's witness from speaking in the Tolbooth and imprisoned him in Crichton Castle. At this time, James VI managed to prevent Wauchope fighting in single combat with David Edmondstone of Womett at Kelso.

=== Holyrood, Falkland, and Craignethan ===
Wauchope participated in the attack on Holyrood Palace organised by Francis Stewart, 5th Earl of Bothwell on 27 December 1591. He was shot and injured in the thigh and hand by John Schaw, master of the king's stable. Schaw was killed by the raiders. For this act he was forfeited and declared a traitor. In March 1592 the ringleaders of the Holyrood raid including Wauchope and Bothwell's half-brother Hercules Stewart, were thought to be in hiding in Northumberland with the earl.

Apparently after attacking Falkland Palace with Bothwell's men, on 1 July 1592 Wauchope was captured with others at the meadow of Lesmahagow by Lord John Hamilton and imprisoned in Craignethan Castle. Lord Hamilton came to Edinburgh to discuss the fate of his prisoners with James VI, who was lodged in John Laing's house at the Netherbow. The house, now Tweeddale Court on the Royal Mile, was heavily guarded by soldiers with "hagbuts" or muskets who shot a volley on Hamilton's arrival, accidentally killing James Sinclair of Earlston, injuring another man in the leg, and chipping a door lintel close to Hamilton's head.

Hamilton expected that the king would pardon Niddry and his companions, but James sent Sir John Carmichael to collect the prisoners. Before Carmichael arrived at Craignethan, one of Hamilton's sons released them, either on the orders of Hamilton, or by the persuasion of Margaret Lyon, Lady Hamilton. Although Lord Hamilton had promised their lives, the English ambassador Robert Bowes said they would have been brought to Edinburgh and "hanged in their boots", and it seems his family released the prisoners at Craignethan rather than have their promise broken.

=== Ferry boat ===
In July 1592 Bothwell and his followers made an elaborate plan to capture James VI from a ferry boat while he was crossing the Forth, but the plot was revealed to Robert Bowes by an informer who wanted the reward of a licence to import English beer. Bothwell waited with two boats out of sight from Leith beyond the island of Inchkeith, and when he realised he was rumbled, put in at Wardie. Bothwell, as was his habit, gave his followers an orientation and warm-up speech before this enterprise, reminding his men not to hurt the king. Wauchope then asked them all to raise their hands and promise not to harm the king, holding both his hands in the air.

=== Dalkeith Palace ===
In August 1592 James VI gave Wauchope's family estates to his household servant Sir John Sandilands. Bothwell and his supporters made several plans to capture the king at Dalkeith, including using Wauchope as a decoy. Two plotters, Michael Balfour of Burleigh and John Wemyss of Logie were caught. Wauchope waited with horses outside Dalkeith Palace at night while his friend John Wemyss of Logie escaped out of Anne of Denmark's window helped by his Danish lover Margaret Vinstarr. The English ambassador Robert Bowes heard that Wauchope set up a written challenge, a "cartell" on the mercat cross of Dalkeith, offering to fight dressed only in his shirt against any who dared question his loyalty to the king. It was said that Wauchope and Captain James Halkerston were "two great undertakers for any desperate exploit" for Bothwell.

On 4 September 1592 he was nearly captured in Leith by the Master of Glamis and James Sandilands, who arrested Captain Halkerston and John Hamilton of Airdrie. Hamilton, a leader at the Raid of Falkland, had asked Wauchope to stay and play cards with him at his lodging. Wauchope refused, preferring to sleep at a secret location. Airdrie and Halkerston were taken to Dalkeith Palace by John Carmichael, Captain of the royal guard, who threatened to torture them with the boot, a device for crushing their legs. Their meeting in Leith had been betrayed by a tailor called Kirkcaldy who was later found blindfolded in a Fife alehouse. Soon after, Wauchope and the Countess of Bothwell made their peace with James VI, who hoped to use them to entrap Bothwell.

=== Death ===
In April 1594 James VI went to Rossend Castle the house of Sir Robert Melville in Fife with his guard, and unsuccessfully tried to capture Wauchope and John Wemyss of Logie. Wauchope planned to help Bothwell attack Holyroodhouse again in September 1594 and abduct James VI to Blackness Castle. In November it was rumoured his support for Bothwell was wavering.

In May 1597, he was thought to be in England, and a request was made for his rendition, with other fugitives and rebels including; Archibald Douglas, James Douglas of Spott, Alexander Home of Prendergast, and Thomas Cranston. On 18 June 1597, he was surrounded in a house on Skinner's Close on Edinburgh's Royal Mile by followers of the Laird of Edmondstone, and fell to his death trying to escape from a dormer or "storm window".

== Marriage and children ==
In 1584 Wauchope married Rachael MacGill, a daughter of the privy councillor James MacGill, and widow of George Stewart of Rosyth. Their son, Francis Wauchope, named after Francis Stewart, 5th Earl of Bothwell, married Jean Sandilands, a daughter of James Sandilands of Slamannan and Jean Crawfurd.

In 1592 when Wauchope was a forfeited rebel, an Act of Parliament allowed Rachael MacGill her "terce", the third of the estate of her first husband George Stewart acquired by her father in name of "tocher" or dowry, and property and incomes from her marriage settlement with Wauchope, because it "was notoriously known to all the country in what miserable estate she was in during the time of the said Archibald remaining in this country, by reason of his own living and hers being all consumed in his vain uses and ungodly fantasies." The Act also encouraged her to dissolve her marriage.

In June 1600 Sandilands seemed likely to get his son-in-law restored to his estates, which angered Sir Robert Ker of Cessford, because Ker's cousin Andrew Edmonstone, Laird of Edmonstone had benefitted by Niddrie's forfeit. Ker argued with James VI that he ought not to restore the estates of followers of the Earl of Bothwell. Sandilands obtained Niddrie-Marischal in 1603, and Francis Wauchope was restored to the estate. Francis Wauchope was fully rehabilated to his estates in April 1609.
