= The People's Journal =

1858–1986 Dundee-based Scottish periodical

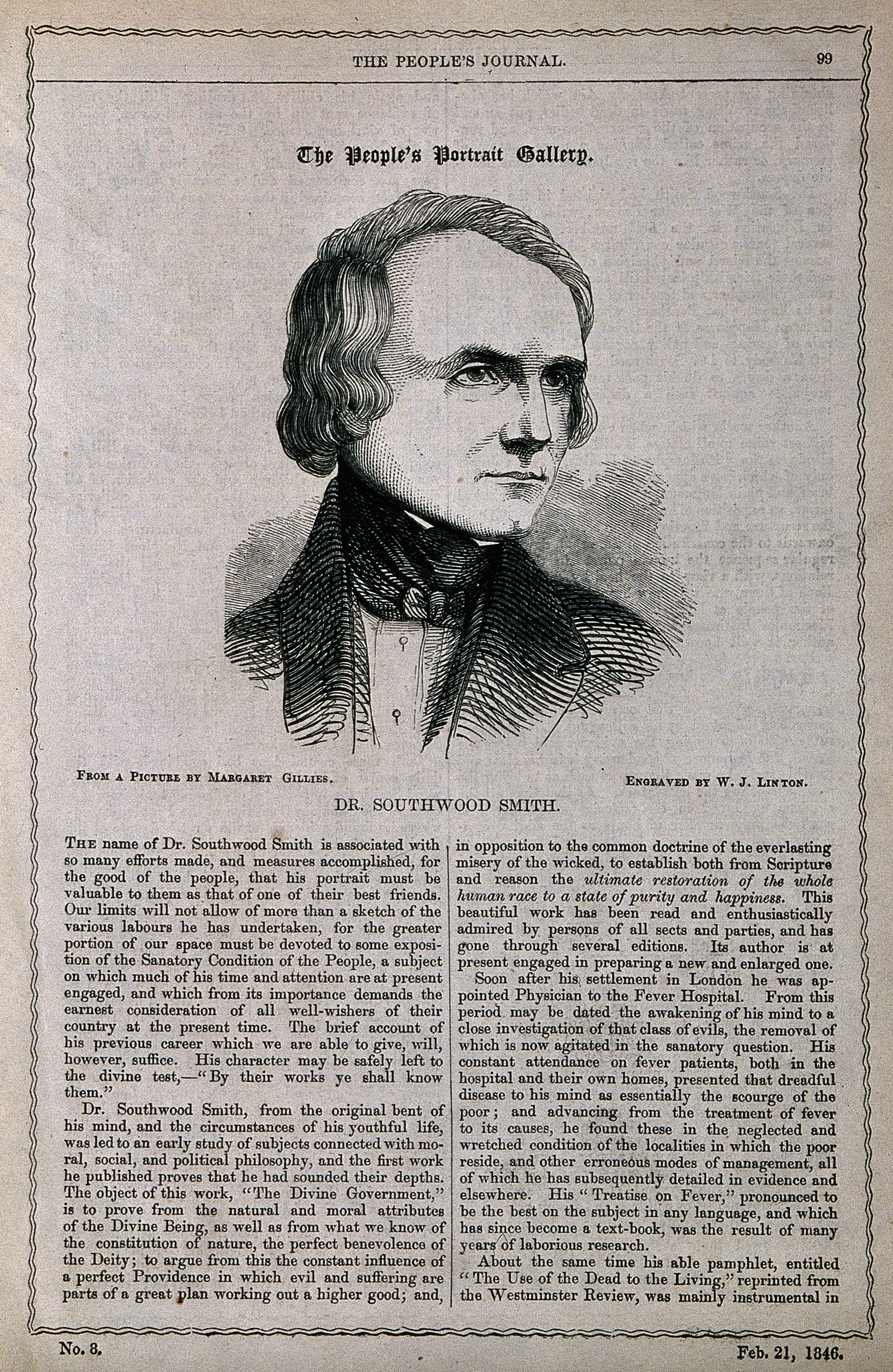
Issue No. 8 from 1846

The People's Journal, first published in 1858, was a Dundee-based Scottish periodical, originally produced by John Leng & Co., a local publishing company that for a time employed the Scottish artist, political cartoonist, postcard illustrator and publisher Martin Anderson (better known by his pseudonym Cynicus) as a member of its staff. Another contributor was Camilla Dufour Crosland. Latterly, The People's Journal was produced by the regional publisher D.C. Thomson & Co. The last edition was published on Saturday 11 January 1986. It carried poetry by readers, including William McGonagall.

Editors included William Duncan Latto and Robert Paterson.
