= The Laird o Logie =

Traditional song

The Laird O Logie or The Laird Of Logie (Roud 81, Child 182) is a traditional English-language folk ballad.

== Synopsis ==
Young Logie (or Ochiltrie) is imprisoned to hang. Mary Margaret comes to court to plead for his life. She cannot win a pardon but steals some token or a forged pardon (sometimes a weapon), sometimes with the queen's aid. With these, she frees Young Logie—the man she loves or the father of her baby, depending on the variant.

== Commentary ==
The ballad is based on historical events in Scotland in 1592. The king of the ballad is James VI of Scotland, the queen is Anne of Denmark, and Young Logie is John Wemyss, the Laird of Logie in North Fife. The offence for which he was imprisoned, unlike the stolen kiss claimed in some variants, was involvement with Francis Stewart, 5th Earl of Bothwell, in an attempt to kidnap the king. Margaret Vinstarr was one of the servants of Anne of Denmark, a Danish maid of honour, and succeeded in rescuing Logie from a prison in Dalkeith Palace. They later married.

== See also ==
- Geordie
