= Thomas Bellenden =

Thomas Bellenden may refer to:

- Thomas Bellenden, Lord Newtyle (died 1591), Scottish judge
- Thomas Bellenden of Auchnoule (c. 1485–c. 1547), courtier of James V of Scotland and judge
