= Andrew Wemyss, Lord Myrecairnie =

Scottish judge and Senator of the College of Justice

Andrew Wemyss, Lord Myrecairnie (c.1545–1617) was a 16th and 17th century Scottish judge and Senator of the College of Justice.

== Life ==
In the 14th century King David III granted lands in Fife to John Wemyss of Reres and Kincaldrum, previously owned by Robert Earl of Fife, making John the ancestor of the Earls of Wemyss.

Andrew was born in the mid-16th century, the second son of James Wemyss of Lathocker, and later owned two estates: Myrecairnie in the parish of Kilmany (north of Cupar) and Logie, both in Fife. His father James Wemyss was killed at the Battle of Pinkie in 1547. Given this death, Andrew must have had little memory of his father.

In November 1591 he was elected a Senator of the College of Justice, replacing Thomas Bellenden, Lord Newtyle (who had drowned). He operated as a Lord of Session until 1615 and died early in March 1617.

== Family ==
He was married to Grisel Drummond. They were parents to John Wemyss of Logie.

They had two further sons, James and David, and a daughter, Eufame.
