= Lucklawhill =

Coordinates: 56.387636°N 2.928801°W

- Location within Fife
- OS grid reference: NO4275222094
- Council area: Fife
- Lieutenancy area: Fife
- Country: Scotland
- Sovereign state: United Kingdom
- Post town: KIRKCALDY
- Postcode district: KY16
- Dialling code: 01334
- Police: Scotland
- Fire: Scottish
- Ambulance: Scottish
- UK Parliament: North East Fife
- Scottish Parliament: North East Fife

Lucklawhill is a hamlet one mile (1.6 km) northwest of the village of Balmullo in Fife, Scotland. Historically, Lucklawhill belonged to the Logie parish.

Lucklaw Hill is located 190 metres (620 ft) above sea level and marks the eastern extremity of the Ochil Hills. The hill on which it stands is mainly composed of feldspar porphyry, with a summit of compacted feldspar. Late 18th and early 19th century authors wrote that Lucklaw Hill was an ancient hunting park belonging to the Kings of Scotland.
