= John Wemyss of Logie =

Scottish courtier and spy

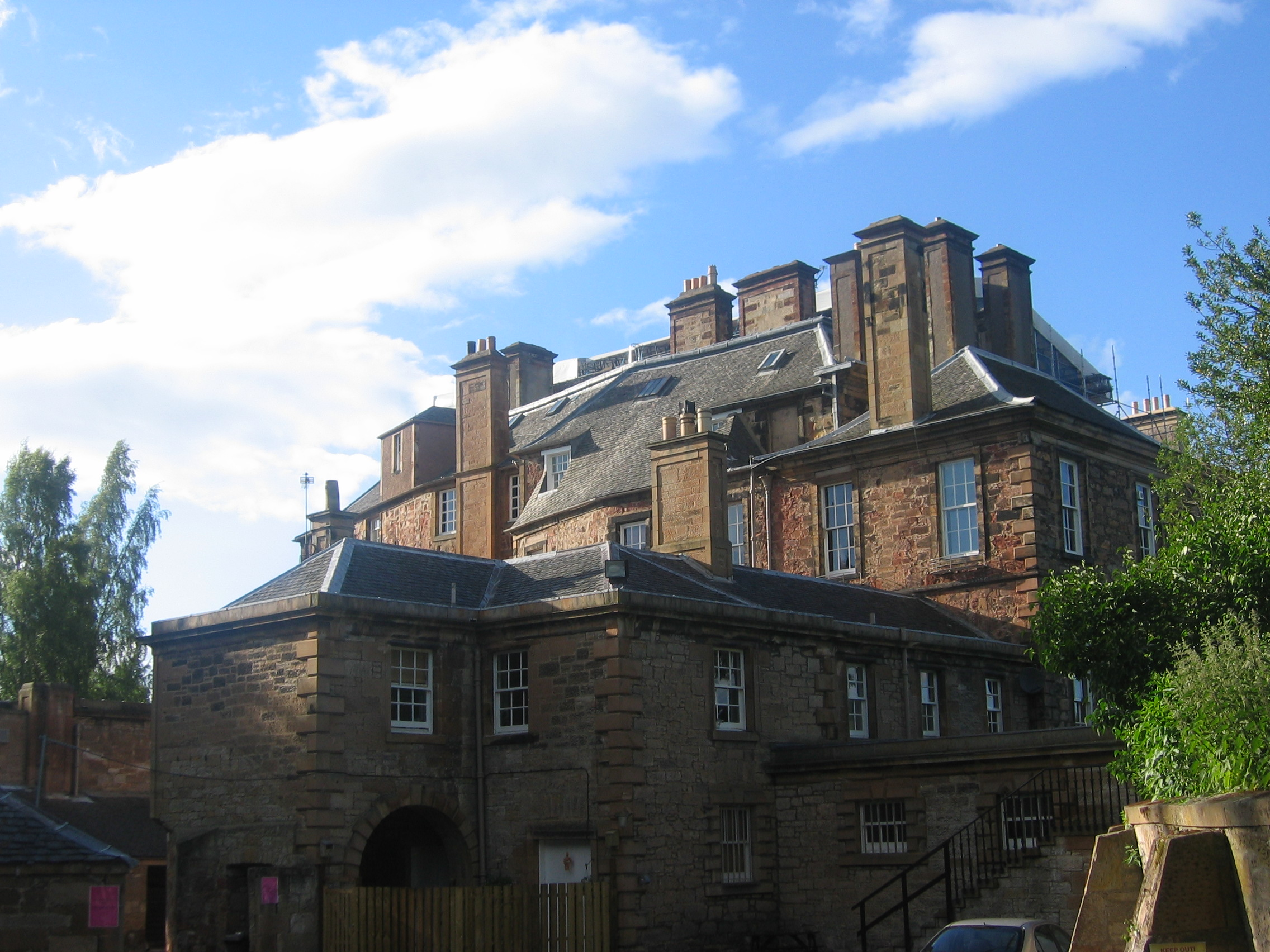
John Wemyss of Logie escaped from Dalkeith Palace with the help of his Danish girlfriend Margaret Winstar

John Wemyss younger of Logie, (1569-1597), was a Scottish courtier, spy, and subject of the ballad "The Laird o Logie", beheaded for plotting to blow up a fortification at Veere in the Netherlands.

== Life ==
John Wemyss was a son of Andrew Wemyss of Myrecairnie and Logie (later Lord Myrecairnie, a law lord).

He was a cousin of David Wemyss, Laird of West Wemyss, in Fife, Scotland. He was usually known as "Logie" after the family estate at Logie in Fife. He was a valet or varlet in the bed chamber of James VI of Scotland and his sister Euphemia was a lady-in-waiting to Anne of Denmark. He is remembered for his relationship and marriage to Margaret Winster or Vinstarr, a Danish woman who helped him escape from prison.

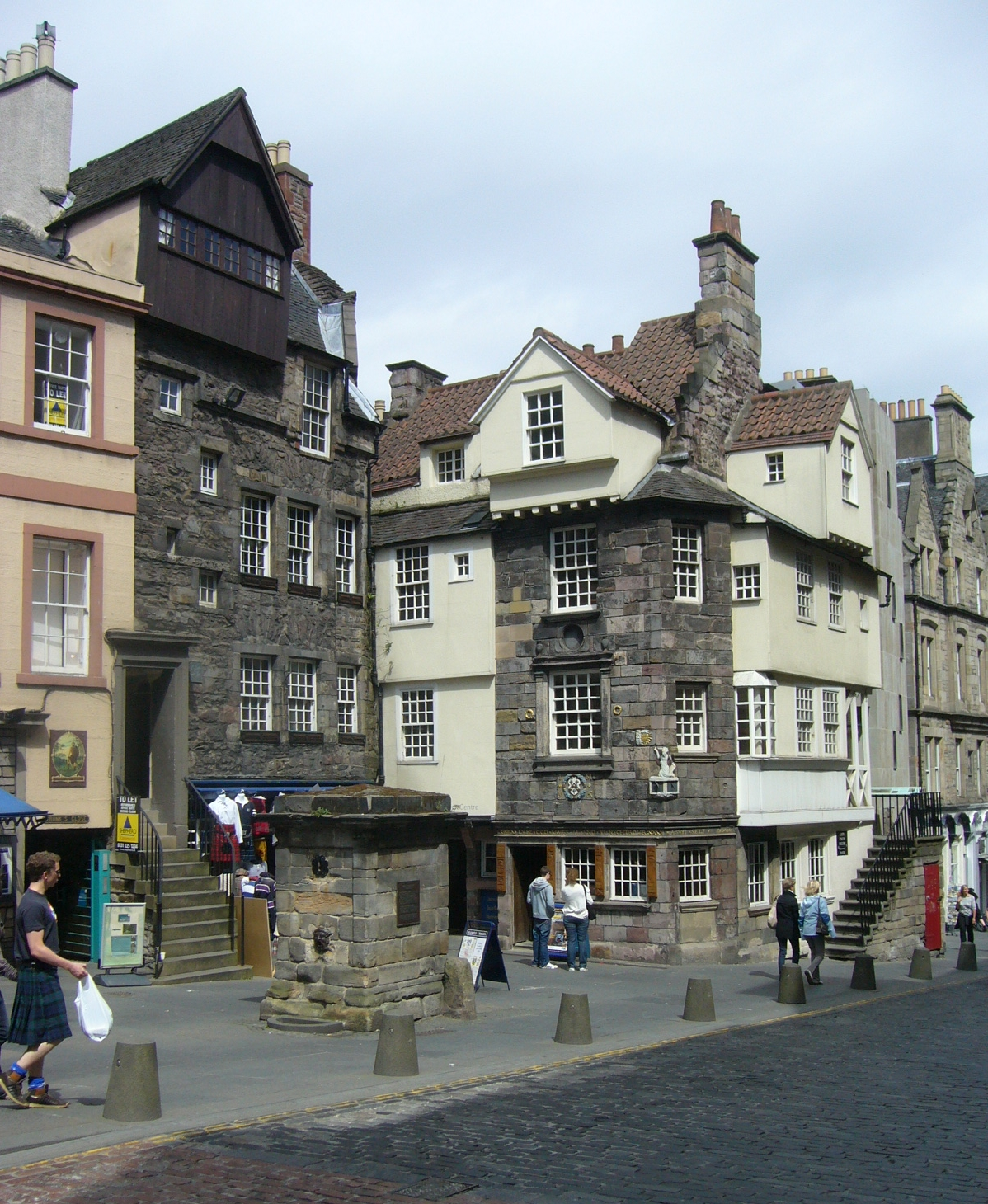
Logie fought with the Duke of Lennox on Edinburgh's High Street

== Quarrel with the Duke of Lennox ==
In 1590, James VI gave Logie £333 Scots from the subsidy money that Queen Elizabeth had given him. In 1591, "young Logy" received £300. These gifts are evidence of royal favour.

On 7 January 1591, Logie came to the attention of Robert Bowes, the English diplomat in Edinburgh who described a fight on Edinburgh's Royal Mile. Logie had upset or made Ludovic Stewart, 2nd Duke of Lennox jealous in an incident in the king's bed chamber. Bowes said the offence was "his disobedience" shown to the Duke. Lennox confronted Logie on the street and hit him on the head with his sword. King James, who was walking behind Logie, was dragged into a shop for safety. Lennox was commanded to leave the court for a while, for fighting near the king's person. Some further details were recorded by David Calderwood. In his version Logie's offence was to refuse to leave the bedchamber at Lennox's command, (Lennox was Chamberlain), Alexander Lord Home helped Lennox attack Logie, and the king's refuge was a skinner's shop where he "fylled his breeches for feare". The kirk minister Robert Bruce of Kinnaird spoke in his next sermon of the lack of reverence of the "men who troubled our causeway". Soon after, Lennox was returned to court by the queen's intervention.

Logie remained in favour, and was probably the valet who attended the king at the wedding of Lilias Murray, the Laird of Tullibardine's daughter, and John Grant of Freuchie on 21 June 1591. The king and his valet changed into costumes with helmets and masks and performed a masque for the guests at Tullibardine. An account for royal costume gives details of "ane stand of maskerye claythis to hym that wes his majesties vallett att thatt tyme".

== Escape from Dalkeith ==
Later in 1592 Logie helped Francis Stewart, 5th Earl of Bothwell who was a rebel against the king. Colonel William Stewart gave information to Sir James Sandilands that led to his arrest. A "Lady Patfaran" also revealed information. She was Isobel Hepburn, Lady Pitfarran, William Stewart's wife.

On 8 August 1592 the Duke of Lennox arrested Logie with Michael Balfour of Burleigh. Logie confessed to planning four different attempts to capture the king. One involved Margaret Vinstarr, Danish maid of honour to the queen, and Logie's mistress and fiancé. She would steal the keys to the back gate of Dalkeith Palace and let in Bothwell's men. When James interrogated him, Logie was immediately cooperative and withheld nothing, saying that many other servants were allies of Bothwell, in part because they had not been paid. Logie said that Bothwell had received money from Spain, but the Laird of Burleigh said this was only a rumour intended to show that Bothwell had Spanish backing and so encourage his faction. Bowes thought that James would want to have Logie executed, but the queen and Margaret Winstar, who was from a well-connected family and thought to be related to the queen, would work to save his life.

Logie was imprisoned in Dalkeith Palace. He escaped with the help of Margaret Winster or Vinstarr who slept in the queen's bedchamber. Vinstarr asked the guards to bring the prisoner to the queen, and then led him through the queen's bedchamber to a window where she had left a rope (or a pair sheets). An accomplice was waiting below with a horse. The story of the escape is the basis of the ballad, "The Laird of Logie". The queen was asked to send Vinstarr back to Denmark but she refused, instead she stayed at Wemyss Castle for a while. On 9 November 1592 Anne of Denmark wrote to the Laird of Wemyss to thank him for looking after her.

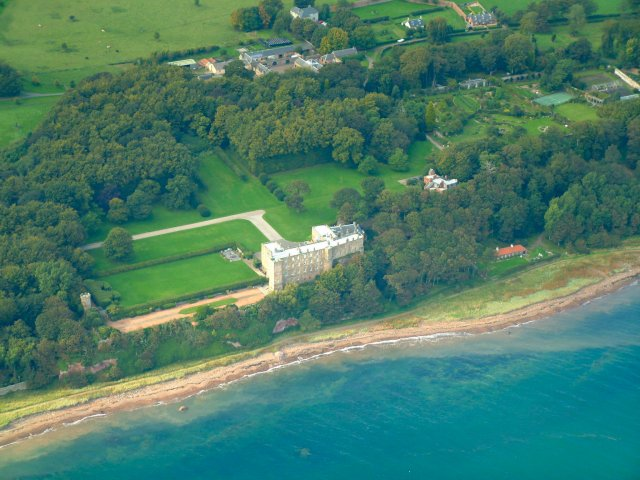
Margaret Winstar waited for the king's anger to subside at Wemyss Castle

David Moysie wrote an account of the escape in Scots, here given with a modernised version;

the same nycht that he was examinat, he escapit out by the meanis of a gentlewoman quhom he loved, a Dence, quho convoyed him out of his keiperis handis throw the Queinis chalmer, quhaire his Majestie and the Queine wer lyand in thair beddis, till a wyndow in the backsyde of the plaice, quhair he gead doun upone a tow, and schot thrie pistoletis in takin of his onlouping, quhaire sum of his servants with the laird of Nithrie wer awaiting him.

the same night that he was examined, he escaped out by the means of a gentlewoman he loved, a Dane, who conveyed him out of his keeper's hands through the Queen's chamber, where his majesty and the queen were lying in their beds, to a window at the back of the place, where he climbed down on a rope, and shot three pistols as a sign of his getaway, where some of his servants with the Laird of Niddry were waiting for him.

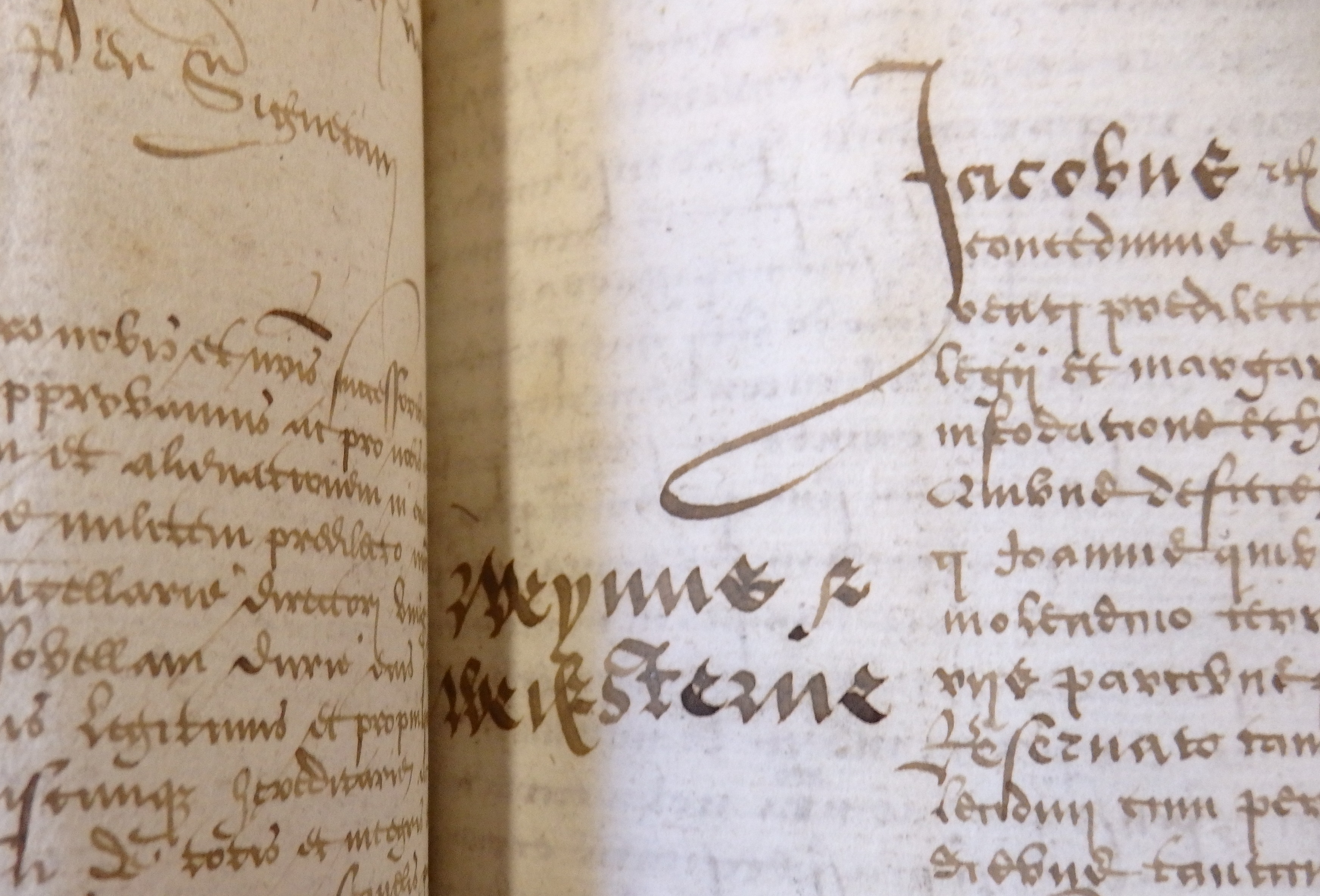
The king's gift to John Wemyss and Margaret Vinstarr, Privy Seal Registers of Scotland

James VI sent a brief account of the incident to Anne of Denmark's brother Christian IV of Denmark in a Latin letter on 17 August 1592, saying that Logie had betrayed his and Anne's trust. Despite the circumstance he had decided to forgive the couple, but Logie was banished from court. Logie was pardoned by James VI on 29 November 1592. He was in Scotland in April 1594 and married in May, a charter of December 1594 names his wife as "Margaret Weiksterne". A chronicle states that Sir Peter Young, the king's almoner and ambassador to Denmark, paid her dowry. Their marriage contract was dated November 1593 and March 1594, for Logie to inherit Myrecairnie, Wester Cruivie, Brighouse, and Logie. James VI also planned to make the lands of Logie a barony.

The story of the escape is also told in the contemporary narrative The Historie and Life of King James the Sext. The author draws attention to Margaret's role in the rescue as an act of charity and a good example for posterity, concluding that by "hir gude cheritable help he happilie escapit be the subteltie of loove". The author of the Historie may have been Mr John Colville, who was also an ally of Bothwell, and mentioned Logie in a letter to Henry Lock, a poet and agent of Sir Robert Cecil.

In June 1593 Robert Bowes described Logie's role in another much less romantic incident. James Gray, a servant of king James and brother of the Master of Gray, had abducted and married Catherine Carnegie daughter of John, Laird of Carnegie. She protested and was given a refuge in house of Robert Jousie in Edinburgh, a cloth merchant and business partner of Thomas Foulis. Gray sent his friend Logie to quietly break into the house. When he discovered that she was still inside, he signalled to James Sandilands and other accomplices to break down the doors and carry her back to Gray, while Lord Home and his followers prevented rescuers. Catherine eventually married Sir John Hamilton of Lettrick.

== Intrigue and execution ==
Logie was in London in March 1594. William Keith of Delny wrote to the Scottish resident agent in London, James Hudson, that both James VI and Anna of Denmark had told him that Logie had no diplomatic mission from them.

In April 1594 James VI came to Rossend Castle in Fife to arrest those suspected of intrigue with Bothwell, including Logie and Archibald Wauchope of Niddrie. Logie gave himself up to the king and was released into the custody of his kinsman the Laird of Wester Wemyss. In August 1594 he was again implicated in Bothwell's rebellion and was arrested on his way to Stirling Castle for the banquet at the baptism of Prince Henry. He was imprisoned at Blackness Castle then in Edinburgh Castle, and threatened with execution.

Margaret Vinstarr, now called "Lady Logie", went to Denmark or Holstein in June 1594 to see her family and returned to Scotland after a year in July 1595. Roger Aston heard she had been to see the queen's mother Sophie of Mecklenburg-Güstrow and brought back the message that the queen ought to obey the king in all things.

=== A stratagem of Theobalds ===
Again the queen intervened for his life and he was released. He tried to gain favour at the English court. On 1 April 1595 the former court musician turned diplomat James Hudson wrote to Anthony Bacon about Logie. Logie had asked Archibald Douglas and Hudson himself to speak to Sir Robert Cecil to advance his suit to Queen Elizabeth. Cecil hesitated to do this because he knew that Logie had been Bothwell's ally. Helping Logie would anger James VI. Hudson was concerned that Logie would now approach the Earl of Essex. He wished that Bacon would acquaint Essex with a cause that may "smell a little of the stratagem of Theobalds". Hudson knew that Bacon would otherwise be reluctant to deny the request of "a gentlemen and a stranger" unless he were "well advertised" that Logie was "in practises".

Logie wrote letters to Scotland with news of England, saying that he enjoyed Elizabeth's great favour. Roger Aston, a servant of the king's bedchamber, wrote to Hudson that this was disappointing news at the Scottish court which must be otherwise than "her majesty meaneth."

Logie had been in London in person in June 1595 when Hudson wrote to Sir Robert Cecil that he had gone Holland with Mr Andrew Hunter, Bothwell's former chaplain. Logie had information on Bothwell's movements and offered to broker peace with the Catholic earls Huntly and Errol, by 'delivering them from Spanish hopes' so that Elizabeth could intercede for them with James VI. Logie's own letter of 3 October 1595 to an unknown recipient in the circle of Robert Cecil describes his journey from England and a meeting with an Italian at Kiel in Holstein. He had news that the Scottish diplomat Colonel Stewart was in Mecklenburg, and Christian IV of Denmark had been to Braunschweig to meet his future wife, Anne Catherine of Brandenburg.

=== Brussels and Veere ===
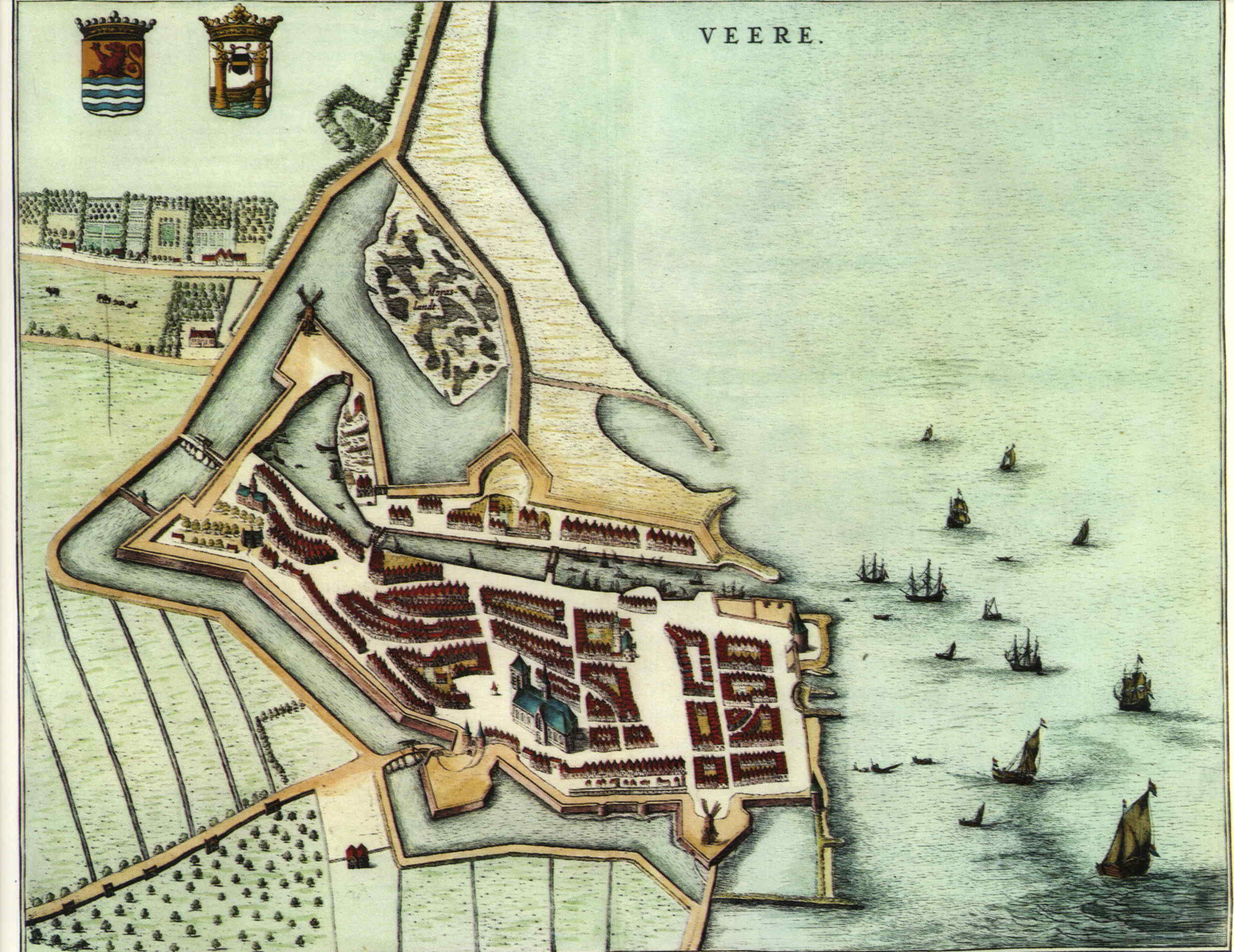
Logie plotted to blow up the Gunpowder Tower at the harbour of Veere and was caught and executed. The tower collapsed into the sea 35 years later

Logie was incriminated by a letter he had written to Sir Robert Cecil, when the English bearer passed it to the Jesuit Father Holt and Sir William Stanley who gave it to the Governor of the Habsburg Netherlands, the Count de Fuentes. In December 1595 he was imprisoned in Brussels for nine months. He was thought to have some information about Spanish affairs, matters within the "King's bounds". A letter of credit for Logie sent by Robert Bowes may have secured his release, or the intercession of John Lesley. Eufame Wemyss, Logie's sister, was banished from Anna's household on 21 November 1595.

Sir Robert Sydney spoke to Logie in October 1596 at Middelburg, and mentioned him in letters to Cecil and Earl of Essex, as "a man of good wit; but men of his profession will ever praise their own commodities". Logie was bound not to return to Scotland or England, under a penalty of £2,000. On 30 October Logie wrote from Veere in Zeeland to the Earl of Essex mentioning that he had been quietly in Germany, and then travelled to Brabant hoping to do Queen Elizabeth good service, and would like to meet the earl.

On 30 November he was arrested at Veere. Logie, who was then said to be 27 years old, was questioned about his movements, his connections to Jesuits, and to the Earl of Essex. Logie answered that he had been travelling to see his wife in Holstein but had missed seeing her. He was accused of planning to capture for Spain the Gunpowder tower, the "Kruittoren", that overlooked the harbour at Veere. He confessed immediately when he was shown the rack, and blamed a Scottish Jesuit Dr Hamilton and two Spanish men who had approached him while he was in prison in Brussels. He made a written confession. Robert Sydney requested a stay of execution on 5 December.

John Wemyss of Logie was beheaded at Middelburg on 8 January 1597 (NS).

Another Scot, named Nicholson, was approached by Juan de Mancicidor secretary to Albert of Austria to help the Spanish take Veere. Robert Sydney and Mr Andrew Hunter, the Scottish preacher and informer, sent copies of Logie's confession to Cecil. Hunter had recommended Logie to Henry Lock, who noted that the laird was cunning and had received a letter from the Earl of Essex. Elizabeth saw in Logie's confession a declaration of James VI's favour to the Catholic party, and in 1599 James VI was required to repudiate the detail of Logie's confession and what he called Andrew Hunter's slander, for Robert Bowes and Elizabeth, which he did on the grounds that Logie died banished and was not of his counsel. Margaret Vinstarr may have remained in Anna of Denmark's household in Scotland.
