= Balmullo =

Coordinates: 56.378393°N 2.928686°W

Balmullo: Scottish Gaelic: Baile Mhullaich; Scots: Bawmullo
- Location within Fife
- Population: 1,320 (2020)
- OS grid reference: NO427210
- Council area: Fife
- Lieutenancy area: Fife
- Country: Scotland
- Sovereign state: United Kingdom
- Post town: St Andrews
- Postcode district: KY16
- Dialling code: 01334
- Police: Scotland
- Fire: Scottish
- Ambulance: Scottish
- UK Parliament: North East Fife
- Scottish Parliament: North East Fife

Balmullo (Gaelic: Baile Mhullaich) is a village in Fife, Scotland. It is 7 miles (11 km) from the town of St Andrews and near to the villages of Lucklawhill, Guardbridge, Dairsie and Leuchars. Army base Leuchars Station is also nearby.

== History ==
The name Balmullo derives from Gaelic bāile "village" with mullaich "top". The village name was recorded as Beilmullhoh in 1282.

Now largely a dormitory settlement, it was once a weaving village. Balmullo was the home of the picture postcard cartoonist Martin Anderson ('Cynicus') whose red sandstone Cynicus Castle was demolished in 1939, seven years after his death.

== Balmullo today ==
Balmullo has a Spar grocery store which doubles as a Post Office and a pub, The Balmullo Inn.

The Balmullo Primary School is located in the heart the village. A village newsletter is published online.

In 2002, the village appeared in news articles after a big cat was allegedly spotted nearby.

== Industry ==
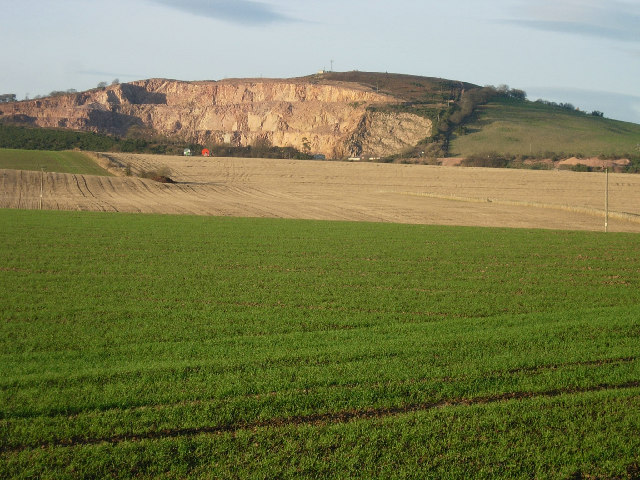
Balmullo quarry

The quarry at Balmullo extracts orange-pink felsite (red pathway chippings), and lies to the west of the village. Minerals found here include azurite, baryte, malachite, metatorbernite, and pseudomalachite.

== Transport ==
Nearby travel links are:

- Leuchars railway station, 1.6 miles (2.6 km)
- Cupar railway station, 5.8 miles (9.3 km)
- Dundee Airport, 10 miles (16 km)
