= Thomas Bellenden, Lord Newtyle =

Thomas Bellenden of Kilconquhar, Lord Newtyle (drowned November 1591) was a Senator of the College of Justice at Edinburgh.

The half-brother of Sir Lewis Bellenden of Auchnole & Broughton, Lord Justice Clerk, Thomas had from his father the barony of Carlowrie and Kilconquhar in Fife, as well as lands in the vicinity of Brechin.

He was admitted an Ordinary Lord of Session on 14 August 1591 in place of Thomas Bellenden of Newtyle, deceased, in the terms of the King's letter, dated at Falkland Palace the preceding day.

However, his place was taken by Andrew Wemyss, Lord Myrecairnie on 17 November, Thomas having drowned in the Loch of Kilconquhar.
