= Cynicus =

Martin Anderson (1854 – 14 April 1932), better known by his pseudonym Cynicus, was a Scottish artist, political cartoonist, postcard illustrator, and publisher.

== Early life ==
Martin Anderson was born in Leuchars, Fife, in 1854. After his mother, Margaret Martin, separated from his father, she moved with her children to Cambuslang, Glasgow. Anderson studied at Glasgow School of Art under Robert Greenlees, in Ingram Street Glasgow. On leaving he worked as a designer at a calico printer.

== Career ==
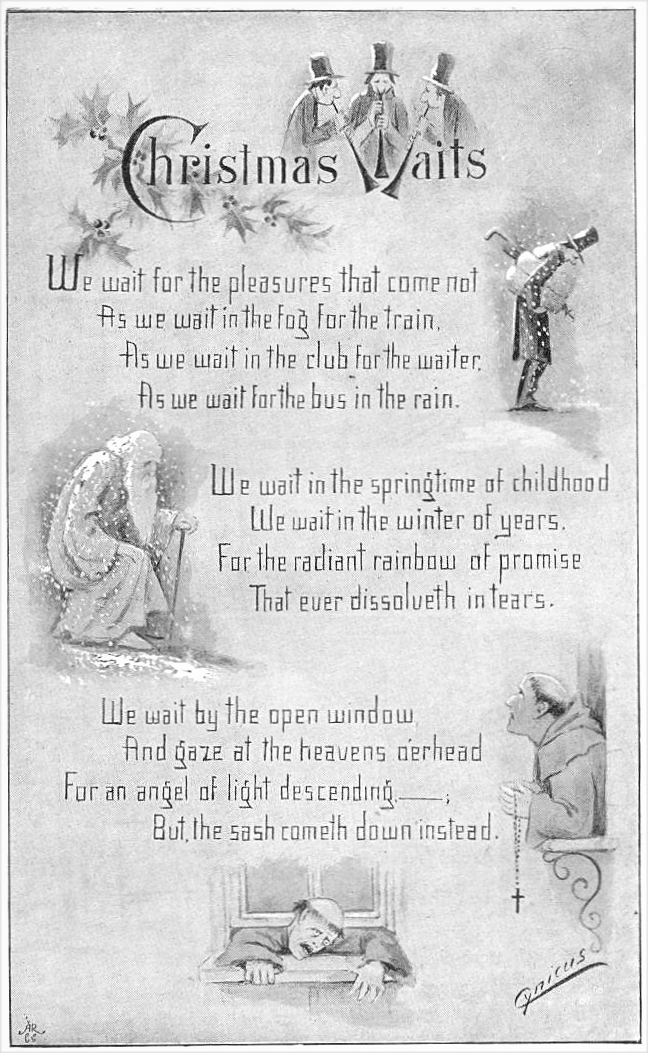
A satiric Christmas poem by "Cynicus" published in The Idler magazine, December 1892

When he was 19, he founded The St. Mungo Art Club in Glasgow, intended to be an alternative to the grander Glasgow Art Club. In 1877, he began to provide small illustrations for serial stories in the short-running News of the Week. In 1878 his painting The Music Lesson was accepted for the Royal Scottish Academy's annual exhibition. In 1879, age 24, he decided to move to London, ("to study art proper" he explained in an 1894 interview in The Sketch).

In 1880 he was invited to join John Leng and Co., (the publisher of titles such as the Dundee Advertiser, the Evening Telegraph, People's Journal, and The People's Friend), as its staff artist. Accepting the position, Andersen became the first such artist to be employed by any daily newspaper in Britain (until then daily newspapers were un-illustrated). He moved to Broughty Ferry near Dundee.

In 1881, as a freelance artist, he began contributing cartoons and illustrations to the comic weekly The Quiz, an imitation of the magazine Punch. For his illustrations in The Quiz he used the pseudonym "bob", but in November 1887 he adopted a second pseudonym, that of "Cynicus", and began to move away "from the safe and trivial to the dangerous and powerful realm of politics".

A series of cartoons titled The Satires of Cynicus appeared in The Quiz in 1888. In 1890 he decided to publish a collected edition of his more controversial subjects. The Quiz cartoons were redrawn in a larger size and hand coloured. They were published in six monthly parts, each part containing two full-page cartoons. However, they did not sell well.

In 1891, he moved back to London in an attempt to get his work noticed, taking a shop in Drury Lane, with the sign "Cynicus Publishing Company" over its door and with prints of his cartoons displayed in its windows. The Satires of Cynicus began to attract public attention and increasing sales. The edition was limited to 1000 copies, and by the end of 1891 it was almost out of print.

In 1891, he began contributing work to the Pall Mall Budget, as well as to The Idler and Ariel or the London Puck, yet another rival to Punch.

A second book, titled The Humours of Cynicus, again containing many reworked The Quiz cartoons, was partwork published starting in September 1891. The complete 1000-copy edition of the complete volume sold for 25 shillings, with a 100-edition deluxe version priced at 2 guineas. In 1892, he began work on another collection, Symbols and Metaphors. It was also issued in parts, like its predecessors. A cheaper edition of The Satires of Cynicus was published in June 1892, and there were also later reprints of it.

== Postcards ==
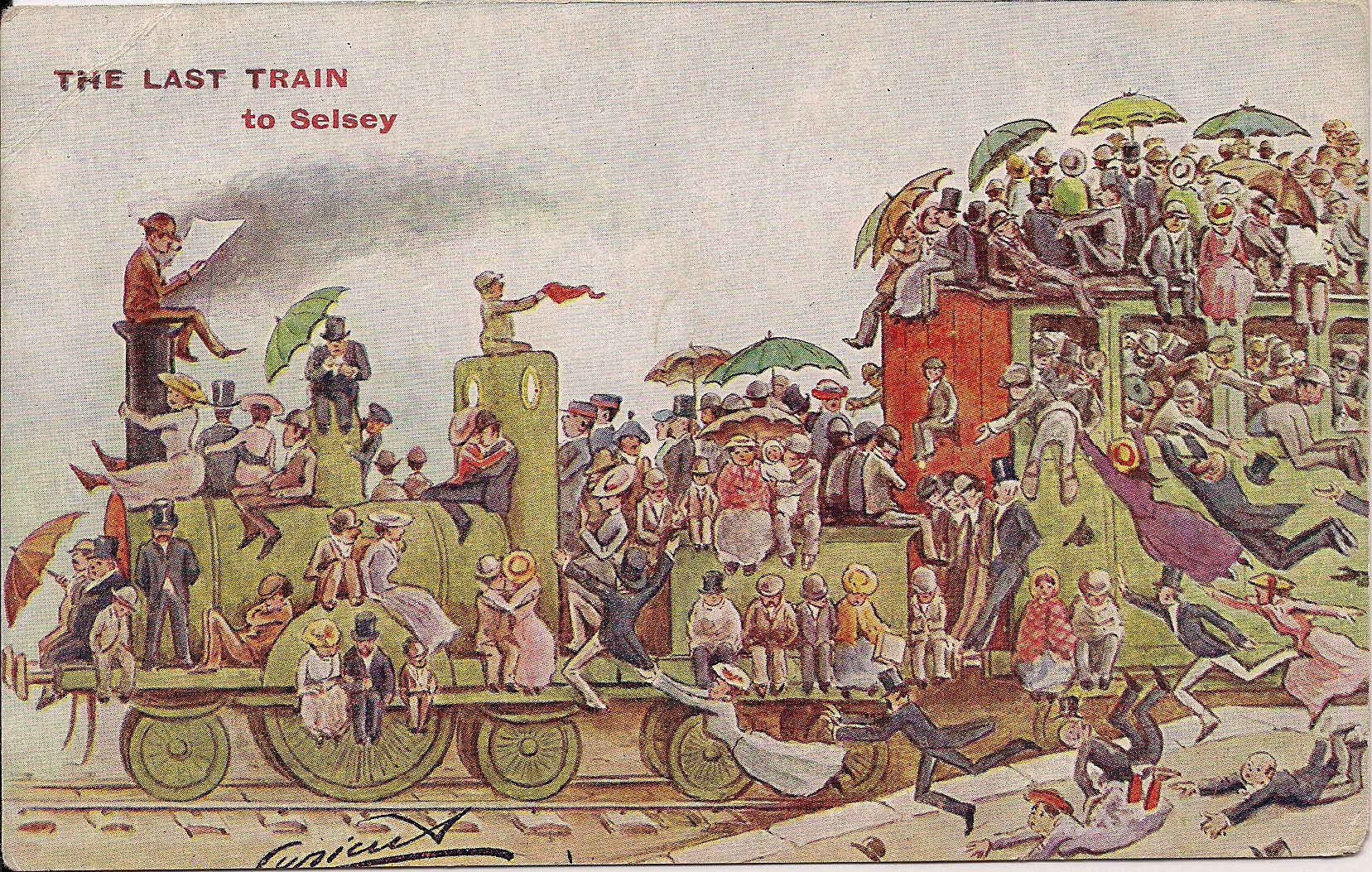
Cynicus Publishing Company postcard posted in 1908

In the late 1890s a new market for his products was quickly emerging – that of picture postcards. In 1898 Anderson began working for Blum & Degan where he designed court-sized postcards. In 1902, after the Post Office allowed divided back postcards, picture postcards became very popular and also began to be widely collected.

In 1902 Anderson decided to form his own company. The "Cynicus Publishing Company" was incorporated as a limited company and began publishing colour postcards by the second half of 1902. Initially, the company did exceedingly well. However, by 1908 the mass-market popularity of postcards began to decline and the company suffered from dwindling profitability. In 1911 the North of Scotland Bank forced the company to liquidate its assets. Its stocks of prints and original artwork were sold by the bank for a fraction of their true value and without any thought for their proper market: they were sold in a second-hand furniture salesroom rather than to art dealers in Edinburgh and London.

In 1912, after the collapse of the Cynicus Publishing Company, Anderson set up the "Cynicus Art Publishing Company" based in Leeds (the home of several postcard publishers), and began reissuing his old postcards and designing new ones. About 100 different postcards are known to have been printed by the Leeds company until 1914.

== WW1 Period ==
The outbreak of war put an end to the seaside postcard market in Britain, and Cynicus Art Publishing Company was forced to close. In 1915 Anderson moved to Edinburgh, leasing a basement shop in York Place. The printing plates for his postcards were sent from Leeds – but for uncertain reasons, and without the knowledge of Andersen, they were sold for scrap.

In 1915 he created an allegorical anti-war poster entitled War!: in a pyramidal composition, a crowned Mammon sits on a throne, tossing away the Nation's wealth to an ecstatic crowd clutching sacks marked "War Profits"; a semi-naked Lust caresses him, famine and disease sit at her feet; Justice and Parliament stand bound and gagged; the Lamp of Truth is extinguished by censorship; the Church encourages the slaughter. In the foreground, a bloody river carries away the bodies of the dead while bankers grab the bank deposits of the dead.

This poster was displayed in his shop window until he was warned he could be interned without trial under the terms of the Defence of the Realm Act (DORA). The poster was removed from view, but was made into a postcard which sold well.

In another allegorical poster titled The Dictator, produced after the end of the war, soldiers returning home are greeted by a fat figure representing Capitalism, seated on a huge sack full of the earnings of others, using a megaphone titled "The Press" to blast out "Propaganda and Misrepresentation" and setting his "Black and Tan" dog onto Ireland; the grave of Liberty and Freedom is trampled over by a truncheon-welding policeman titled DORA; two more fat figures, representing Lloyd George (standing on broken pledges) and the Church, carry a banner titled "Britain's welcome to the Troops" that frames the entrance to a poorhouse.

== Retirement and death ==
In 1924, his Edinburgh shop was destroyed by fire, everything inside it was lost, and he did not have the funds to repair and restock it. He retired to his castle-like mansion in Balmullo to live in increasing poverty. A final edition of The Satires of Cynicus was published in 1926.

In 1930 he wrote "Memoirs of Cynicus", published in 12 instalments in the Glasgow Evening News.

He died suddenly on 14 April 1932 and was buried in the Martin family grave in Tayport Old Churchyard. The funeral was never paid for and his grave is unmarked, without a tombstone.

His mansion in Balmullo was extensively vandalised after his death.

== Sources ==
Reid, Elspeth; Davidson, Flora (1995). The Fortunes of Cynicus: Victorian Cartoonist and Postcard Designer. Forest Lodge. ISBN 095259790X.
