= Margaret Vinstarr =

Danish courtier in Scotland to Anne of Denmark

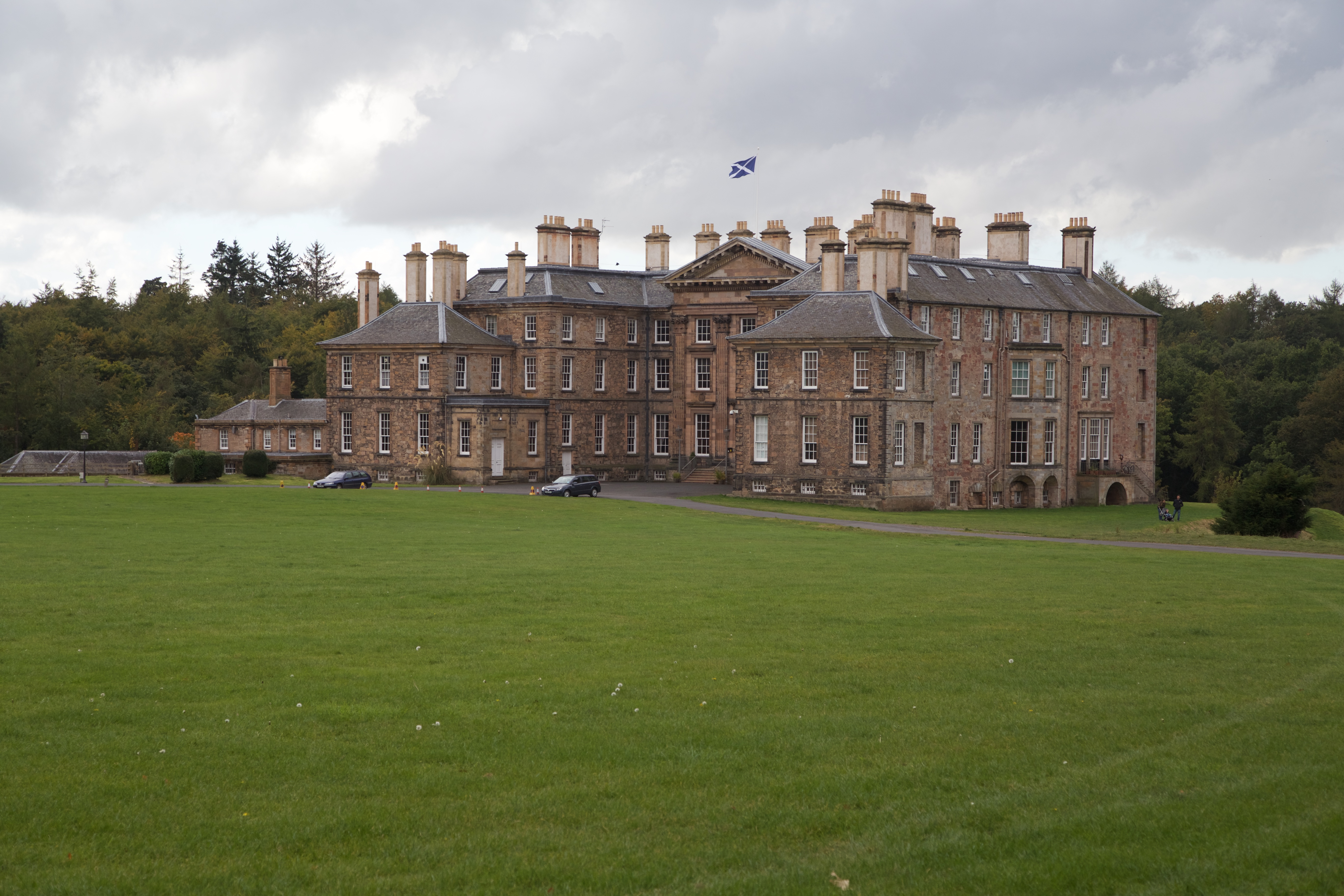
Margaret Winstar planned her lover's escape from Dalkeith Palace

Margaret or Margrethe Vinstarr (fl. 1590–1600), was a Danish courtier in Scotland to Anne of Denmark commemorated by the ballad "The Laird o Logie" for rescuing her imprisoned lover.

== A gentlewoman at the Scottish court of Anne of Denmark ==
Margaret Vinstarr's family background is unclear, and her family name was written in various forms in Scotland, including "Wencksternis", "Winster", and "Vinkstarn". The family name "Venstermand" has been suggested. Robert Bowes noted that she was descended from a wealthy Danish family.

She was a favoured courtier of Anne of Denmark, whose Scottish household included ladies in waiting and servants from Denmark and the northern states of Germany. She may have come to Scotland with the diplomat Paul Knibbe in July 1591, when two gentlewomen left to return to Denmark. The two departing courtiers were probably Sophia Kaas and Cathrina Skinkel who had attended Anne of Denmark's coronation. Anne of Denmark bought clothes for her, and the accounts show that she accompanied the queen when she went out riding.

Vinstarr is remembered because of her relationship and marriage with John Wemyss of Logie, a servant or varlet in the bedchamber of James VI of Scotland, and the daring escape she planned for him, featured in ballads and chronicles. John Spottiswoode, who was the queen's almoner in 1603, named "Margaret Twinslace" as one of the "Dutch Maids" and the "principal Maid in the Chamber".

== Logie's confession ==
In 1592, John Wemyss younger of Logie helped Francis Stewart, 5th Earl of Bothwell who was a rebel against the king. He was a son of Andrew Wemyss of Myrecairnie and Logie and a cousin of David Wemyss, laird of West Wemyss whose sister Euphemia was a lady-in-waiting to the queen. Logie was probably the valet who attended the king at the wedding of Lilias Murray, the Laird of Tullibardine's daughter, and John Grant of Freuchie on 21 June 1591. Another of Bothwell's supporters, Josias Stewart, was the son of Margaret Stewart, Mistress of Ochiltree, a senior lady in waiting whose three daughters were maidens of honour in the queen's household. Possibly Logie and Josias Stewart were friends, and Margaret Winstar came to know Logie through this connection.

Margaret Vinstarr was still at court, and in high favour with the queen, and on 13 June 1592 Anne of Denmark ordered matching orange gowns with green sleeves for her, herself, the Scottish maiden of honour Marie Stewart, and a page boy William Belo.

In August the Duke of Lennox arrested Logie and Michael Balfour of Burleigh. Logie confessed to planning four different attempts to capture the king. One of these schemes involved Margaret Vinstarr, identified as his mistress or fiancée. She would steal the keys to the back gate of Dalkeith Palace and let in Bothwell's men. When James interrogated him, Logie was immediately cooperative and withheld nothing. This full and unexpected confession was tantamount to his own death sentence. Logie said that many other royal servants were allies of Bothwell, in part because they had not been paid. He said that Bothwell received money from Spain but Burleigh explained this as a deliberate rumour to encourage Bothwell's supporters. The English diplomat Robert Bowes thought that James VI meant to have Logie executed, but guessed that the queen and Margaret Vinstarr, who was from a well-connected family and thought to be related to the queen, would intercede to save his life.

== Escape from Dalkeith Palace ==
Logie was imprisoned in Dalkeith Palace. He escaped with the help of Margaret Vinstarr who slept in the queen's bedchamber. Vinstarr asked the guards to bring the prisoner to the queen, and then led him through the queen's bedchamber to a window where she had left a rope (or a pair of sheets). An accomplice was waiting below with a horse. The escape echoed the scheme of one of Logie's confessions. The story is the basis of the ballad, "The Laird of Logie" and its variant "The Laird of Ochiltree". A sympathetic contemporary newsletter gave a summary, and states that Vinstarr was related to the queen:

The Lord Bothwell having persuaded the Laird of Burlye and the young Laird of Logie, great courtiers, being at tryst in the Laird of Burlye's house once or twice, it chanced to be declared and revealed to the king, whereof both the said Lairds were taken and examined by his Majesty and Council, ... Burlye was remitted because of his confession, and the king was so commovit at Logie that (he) was ordeyned to suffer for his fault and would have suffered were not the good help his love made him, her majesty's gentlewoman of honour Mrs Margaret and of her majesty's blood as of that country, that she pertly and right craftily delivered him in the night, fetched him from the guard as to speak with the Queen, and two of the guard with him, which two she detained at her Majesty's chamber door and herself "purposand" with them until he was forth at a window of the Castle of Dalkeith.

The escape was highlighted in a contemporary narrative, The Historie and Life of King James the Sext. The anonymous author calls Margaret Vinstarr "Twynstoun". He draws attention to her role in the rescue as an act of charity and a good example for posterity, concluding that by "hir gude cheritable help he happilie escapit be the subteltie of loove". His narrative of the escape is quoted here with spellings modernised;

"And because the event of this matter had such a success, it shall also be praised by my pen, as a worthy turn, proceeding from honest, chaste love and charity, which should in no way be obscured from posterity for a good example. And therefore I have thought good to insert the same for a perpetual memorial. Queen Anne, our noble Princess, was served with diverse gentlewomen of her own country, and namely, by one called Mistress Margaret Twynstoun, to whom this gentleman, Weymss of Logie, bore great honest affection, tending to the godly band of marriage; the which was honestly requited by the said gentlewoman, yea even in his greatest misfortune. For how soon she understood the said gentleman to be in distress, and apparently be his confession, to be punished to the death, and she having privilege to lie in the Queen's chamber, that same very night of his accusation, where the King was also reposing that same night, she came forth of the door privily, both the princes (the king and queen) being then at quiet rest, and passed to the chamber where the said gentleman was put in custody, to certain of the guard, and commanded them that immediately he should be brought to the King and Queen. To which they giving sure credence, obeyed. But how soon she was come back to the chamber door, she desired the watchmen to stay till he should come forth again, and so she closed the door, and conveyed the gentleman to a window, where she passed a long cord to him to convey himself down upon, and so by her good charitable help he happily escaped by the subtlety of love.

Logie made his getaway on a horse brought by his friend Archibald Wauchope of Niddrie. James VI asked the queen to send Vinstarr back to Denmark but she refused. A newsletter reported that Anne of Denmark said she would rather go to Denmark than part with Mistress Margaret or any other of her domestic servants.

== At Wemyss Castle ==
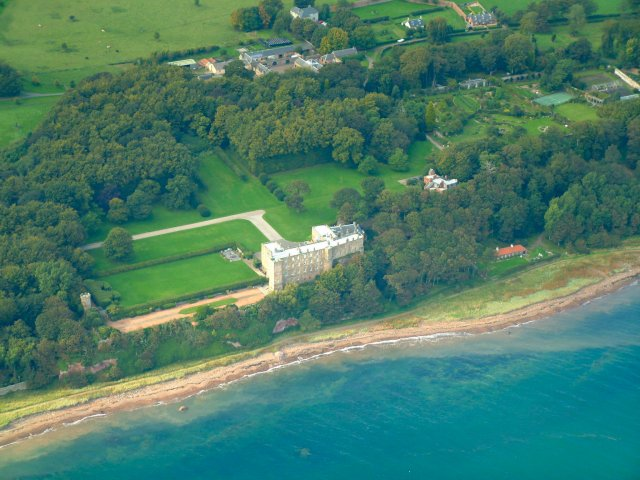
Margaret Vinstarr was welcomed at Wemyss Castle

Margaret Vinstarr left the royal court and stayed at Wemyss Castle, in Fife for a while. On 9 November 1592 Anne of Denmark wrote to the Laird of Wemyss to thank him for looking after "Maistres Margret, our servant and dame of honnour", promising to reimburse him for Margaret's expenses at the castle.

James VI sent a brief account of the incident to Anne of Denmark's brother Christian IV of Denmark in a Latin letter on 17 August 1592, saying that Logie had betrayed his and Anne's trust, giving his sister's servant's name as "Margareta Vinkstarn" and describing her as a close familiar servant of the queen. Despite the circumstance he had decided to forgive the couple, but Logie was banished from court. Margaret Vinstarr returned to favour in the queen's household. On the evening of 5 August 1593 the queen sent her with letters to the departing Danish ambassadors, Niels Krag and Steen Bille.

== Marriage ==
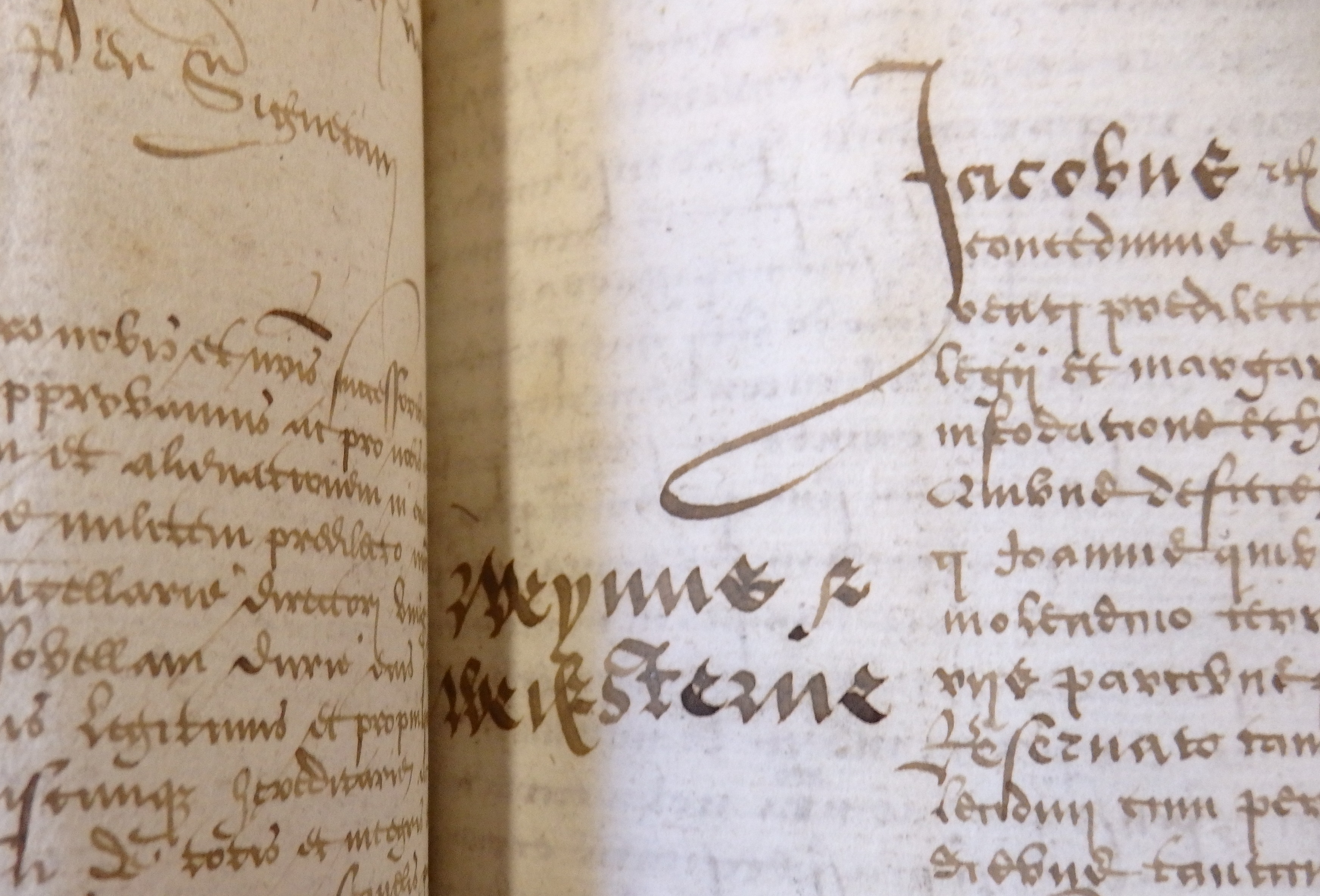
The king's gift to John Wemyss and Margaret Vinstarr, Privy Seal Registers of Scotland

Logie was pardoned by James VI and he was married to Margaret in October or November 1593. A Privy Seal charter of December 1594 names his wife as "Margarette Weiksterne". A chronicle states that Sir Peter Young, the king's almoner and ambassador to Denmark, had paid her dowry. The exact date of their wedding is unknown, the marriage contract was dated November 1593 and March 1594, for Logie to inherit the lands of Myrecairnie, Wester Cruivie, Brighouse, and Logie. James VI also planned to make the lands of Logie a barony. Anna gave her clothes, including blue velvet night-gear, and a present of an elaborate bed with rich curtain fabrics.

Margaret Vinstarr, now called "Lady Logie" went to Denmark (or Holstein) in June 1594 to see her family. The queen gave her a gown of black taffeta as a parting gift. She returned to Scotland after a year in July 1595. Roger Aston heard she had been to see the queen's mother Sophie of Mecklenburg-Güstrow and brought back a message that the queen ought to obey the king in all things.

== Logie in Holstein and the Netherlands ==
Logie continued to be suspected, and in August 1594 was again implicated in Bothwell's rebellion. He was arrested on his way to Stirling Castle for the banquet for the baptism of Prince Henry. He was imprisoned at Blackness Castle then in Edinburgh Castle, and threatened with execution. Again the queen intervened for his life and he was released and went abroad. His sister, Eufame Wemyss, was banished from the household and the queen's presence.

Logie wrote on 3 October 1595 to an associate of Sir Robert Cecil describing his journey from England and a meeting with an Italian at Kiel in Holstein, which may suggest that Margaret's family was in Holstein. He was arrested at Veere and questioned about his movements, his connections to Jesuits, and to the Earl of Essex. Logie answered that he had been travelling to see his wife in Holstein but had missed seeing her. He was accused of planning to capture for Spain the Gunpowder tower, the "Kruittoren", that overlooked the harbour at Veere. He confessed immediately when he was shown the rack. He blamed a Scottish Jesuit Dr Hamilton and two Spanish men who had approached him while he was in prison in Brussels for devising the plan. Robert Sidney requested a stay of execution on 5 December. John Wemyss of Logie was beheaded at Middelburg on 8 January 1597 (NS).

Logie's confession was a political embarrassment for James. However, Margaret Winster seems to have remained in Anna of Denmark's household for a time, but then returned to her family.

The exact dates of Margaret Vinstarr's birth and death are unknown.
