= Dalkeith Palace =

Coordinates: 55°53′58″N 3°4′4″W

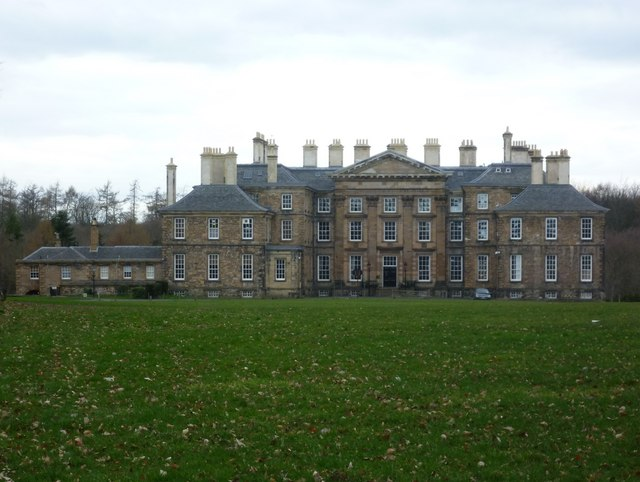
- Dalkeith Palace in 2011

General information
- Architectural style: Dutch Baroque, Neoclassical
- Location: Dalkeith, Midlothian, Scotland
- Construction started: 1701
- Completed: 1711
- Owner: Buccleuch Living Heritage Trust

Design and construction
- Architects: James Smith; John Adam

Inventory of Gardens and Designed Landscapes in Scotland
- Official name: Dalkeith House (Palace)
- Designated: 30 June 1987
- Reference no.: GDL00128

Dalkeith Palace is a country house in Dalkeith, Midlothian, Scotland. It was the seat of the Dukes of Buccleuch from 1642 until 1914, and is owned by the Buccleuch Living Heritage Trust. The present palace was built 1701–1711 on the site of the medieval Dalkeith Castle, and was latterly renamed Dalkeith House.

== History ==
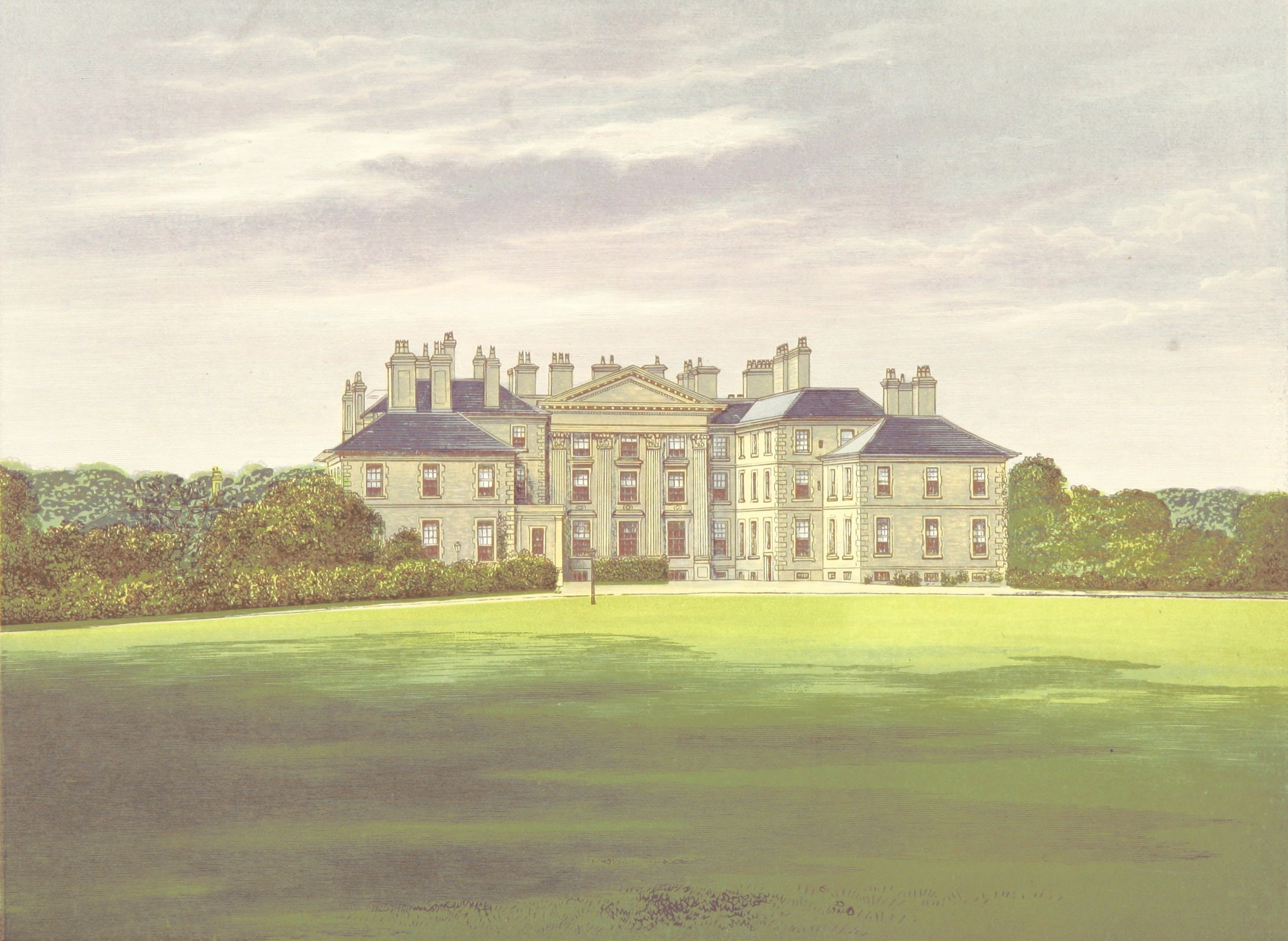
Dalkeith Palace in 1880

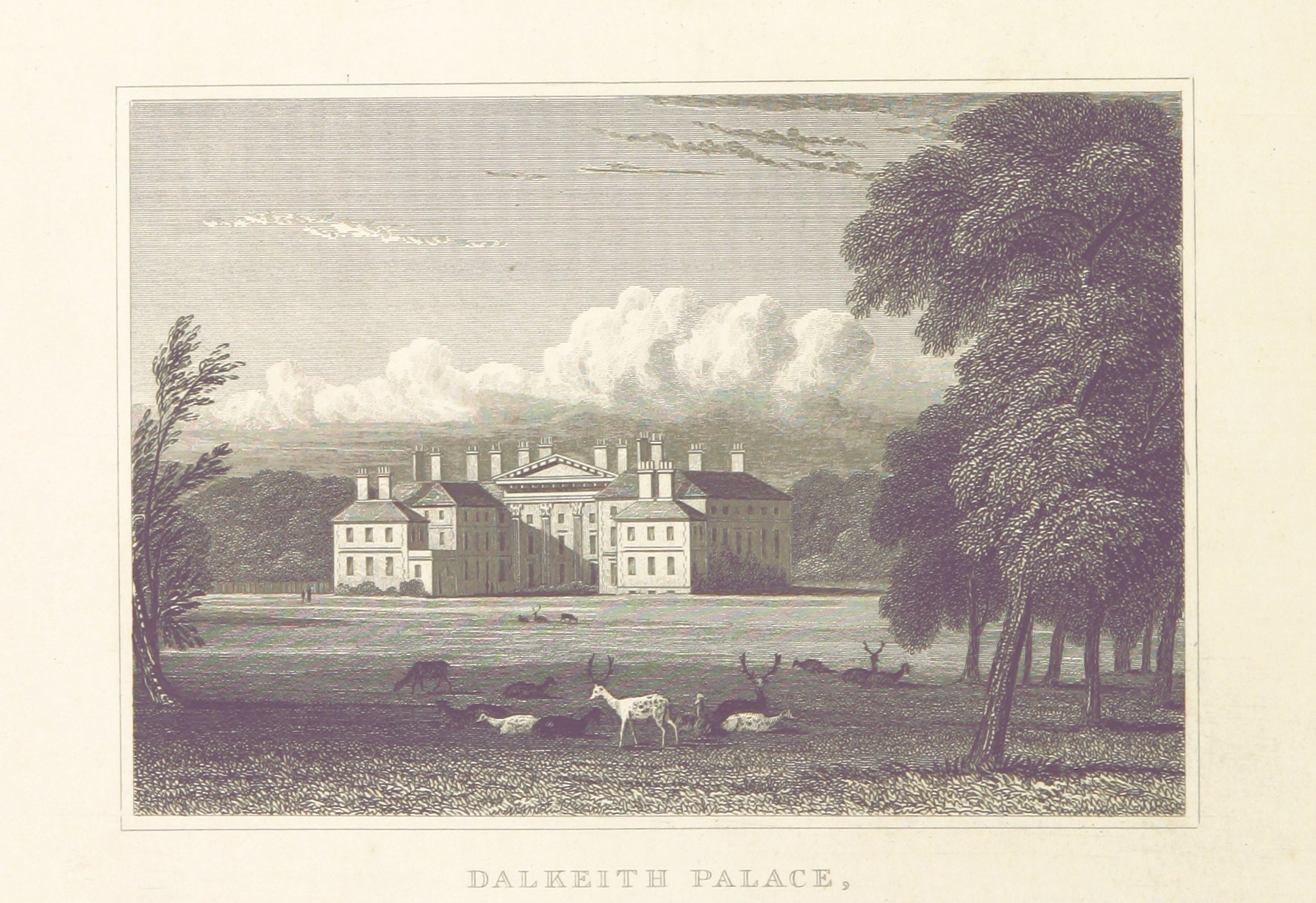
Dalkeith Palace by John Preston Neale, 1829

=== The medieval castle ===
Dalkeith Castle was located on the same site as the present palace, to the north east of Dalkeith. It dated from the 12th century when it was in the possession of the Clan Graham, Lords of Dalkeith. With the death of John de Graham in 1341–1342 the castle and the barony of Dalkeith passed to the Clan Douglas via his sister, Marjory, who was married to Sir William Douglas. James Douglas of Dalkeith became the Earl of Morton in the mid 15th century. The castle was strategically located in an easily defensible position above a bend in the River North Esk. Nearer the centre of Dalkeith, James Douglas, 1st Lord Dalkeith, endowed the collegiate church in 1406, where Douglas earls, lords, and knights were buried.

Margaret Tudor, the bride of King James IV, stayed at Dalkeith Castle as the guest of the Earl of Morton before her formal entry to Edinburgh in 1503. In 1543, Cardinal Beaton was imprisoned in Dalkeith Castle. In November 1543, Regent Arran besieged the Douglas family at Dalkeith with artillery. The castle was captured on 3 June 1548 during the war of the Rough Wooing by the English soldiers James Wilford and Thomas Wyndham, with the Spanish captain Pedro de Gamboa. The Earl of Angus wrote to his daughter Margaret Douglas, Countess of Lennox that the "house of Dalkeith was destroyed".

Mary, Queen of Scots, rode from Edinburgh to stay a few days at Dalkeith in October 1565. From June 1574, Regent Morton, who had been captured at the siege of 1548, extended the castle. Sir John Forster, an English border warden captured at the Raid of the Redeswire, was held in the palace in July 1575.

=== James VI and Charles I ===
When King James VI reached his majority in October 1579, following celebrations in Edinburgh, Morton entertained the young king at Dalkeith Castle.

James VI and Anne of Denmark frequently stayed at the castle. While they were in residence in August 1592, a prisoner John Wemyss of Logie escaped through their bedchamber, helped by the queen's servant, Margaret Vinstarr. In 1598 the royal master of work William Schaw prepared a nursery for the queen at Dalkeith Castle and Princess Margaret was born there on Christmas Eve.

In August 1601 the infant Prince Charles was seriously ill while staying at the castle, but recovered. During his illness, Anne of Denmark wrote a controversial letter to Cardinal Borghese.

William, 6th Earl of Morton had the brewhouse, gates, and drawbridge repaired. James VI visited the palace on 11 June 1617. Andrew Simson presented a Latin poem celebrating the palace's grounds and describing the song of the Dalkeith nightingale. A list of luxurious furnishings in the castle in 1622 details a bed with curtains of grey and purple damask and cloth of silver in the "Queen's chamber".

William, 7th Earl of Morton, Treasurer of Scotland, entertained King Charles I during his visit to Scotland in 1633. The king liked the place so much he considered buying the estate and turning it into a deer park. By 1637, Charles had decided to buy the castle and estate from Lord Morton. The castle was re-fortified and strengthened in order to prepare it for the king. Among other alterations, Charles I built an additional drawbridge and extra defences. With the Wars of the Three Kingdoms, Charles I found it difficult to complete his purchase of Dalkeith, and the castle was eventually returned to the Earl of Morton.

=== Dalkeith Palace ===
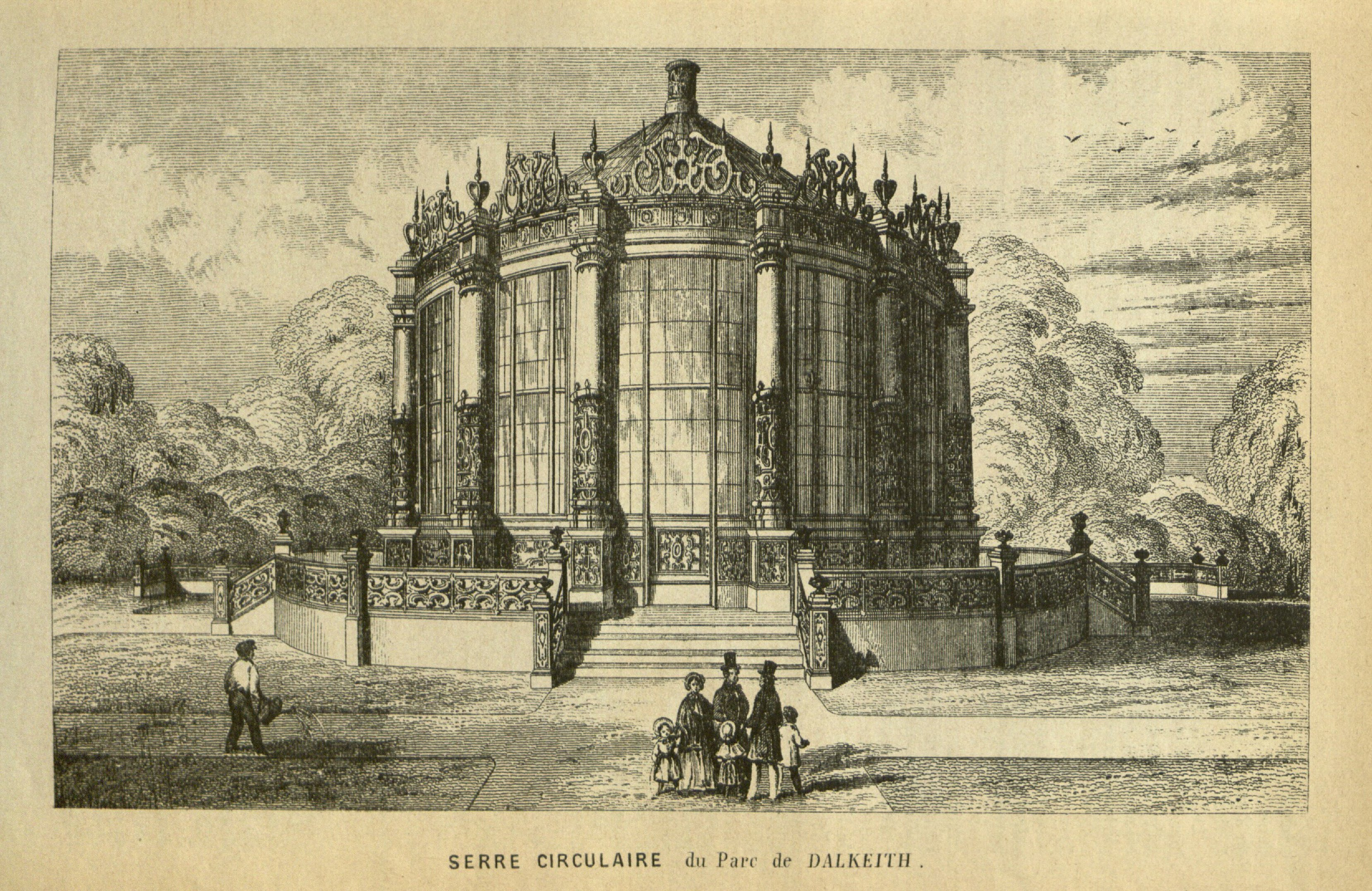
Serre Circulaire du Park de Dalkeith

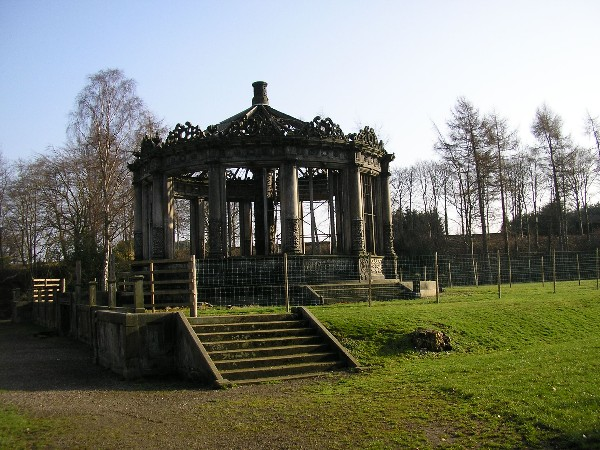
The Conservatory

In 1642, Dalkeith Castle was sold by the Earl of Morton to Francis Scott, 2nd Earl of Buccleuch. The 2nd Earl of Buccleuch's daughter, Anne, married James, Duke of Monmouth, the eldest illegitimate son of King Charles II in 1663, and they became the Duke and Duchess of Monmouth and Buccleuch. After the Duke had been executed for treason, his widow asked architect James Smith to use William of Orange's palace of Het Loo in the Netherlands as a model for the new Dalkeith Palace.

Smith and his cousins, Gilbert and James, signed the contract for mason work at Dalkeith Castle in March 1702. Construction of Dalkeith Palace began later that year, Smith deciding to incorporate a portion of the tower house of the old castle into the western side of the new structure. The outline of the old tower walls is still visible in the western facade of the palace today.

In 1704, William Walker and Benjamin Robinson, the chamberlain of the Duchess, went to London with a small party to choose items of furniture for the palace. Construction was proceeding at a steady pace, and the main portion of the palace was roofed by the end of 1705. The London marble-cutter Richard Neale spent sixty-four weeks at the palace with nine assistants between 1709 and 1711, carving the main stairwell and screen of the Great Staircase. Several marble chimney pieces were installed, as well as an intricately carved marble bas-relief of Neptune and Galatea. This internally extensive use of marble was very much the taste of the Duchess. The majority of construction was complete by 1711.

Finishing touches on the palace complex included adding a wrought iron screen with freestone piers (no longer existing) around the forecourt, a great deal of planting, and the laying out of a great avenue through the park. Dalkeith Park itself was a large area of manicured trees and gardens which in later years would include the Montagu Bridge over the North Esk River and the Dalkeith Conservatory and a grassed amphitheatre. When the final calculations were made, it was determined that the construction of Dalkeith Palace had cost the Duchess a total of £stg.17,727.

The plumber John Scott of Edinburgh re-plated the roof in lead in 1743. Some minor additions were carried out in the following years. John Adam resurfaced the building in 1762 and James Playfair inserted a low window into the east facade in 1786.

Overall, the palace is built of sandstone and has the main entrance on the south front, flanked on each side by two Corinthian order pilasters. These are surmounted by a bracketed pediment unusual for its depth. The layout of Dalkeith Palace was unusual for the time in that the state apartment was located on the ground floor, which prevented the Great Dining Room from being placed in its customary position at the start of the state apartment. As such, the Great Dining Room was placed on the first floor, still suitable for important occasions and also serving as an anteroom to another apartment on the first floor.

=== 18th and 19th centuries ===
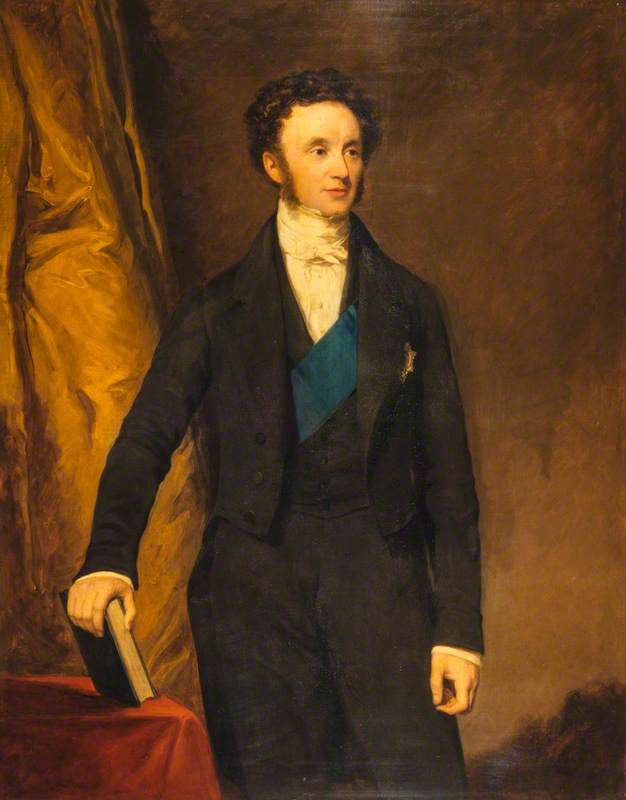
The 5th Duke of Buccleuch

Walter Montagu Douglas Scott, 5th Duke of Buccleuch considered extensive rebuilding in 1831 and William Burn produced unexecuted designs in Jacobethan style. More minor alterations were carried out, together with improvements to the surrounding estate including a new house and offices for the Duke's Chamberlain, and the construction, for the 5th Duke, of St Mary's Church as a private chapel by William Burn and David Bryce. The church contains one of only two water-powered organs in Scotland.

Several well-known figures from English and Scottish history have been guests at the palace in the intervening centuries. Bonnie Prince Charlie stayed two nights at Dalkeith in 1745, King George IV slept here during his visit to Edinburgh in 1822, in preference to the Palace of Holyroodhouse which was in a poor state, as did Queen Victoria in 1842. Dalkeith Palace was also visited by Edward VII in 1899 and 1903, and George V in 1907 and 1910. During World War II, Polish troops of the 3rd Flanders Rifle Brigade, part of the 1st Polish Armoured Division, were quartered on the third floor of Dalkeith Palace from 1942 onwards. Graffiti drawn by these troops is still visible on the third floor wallpaper of the palace as of 2008.

== Subsequent history ==
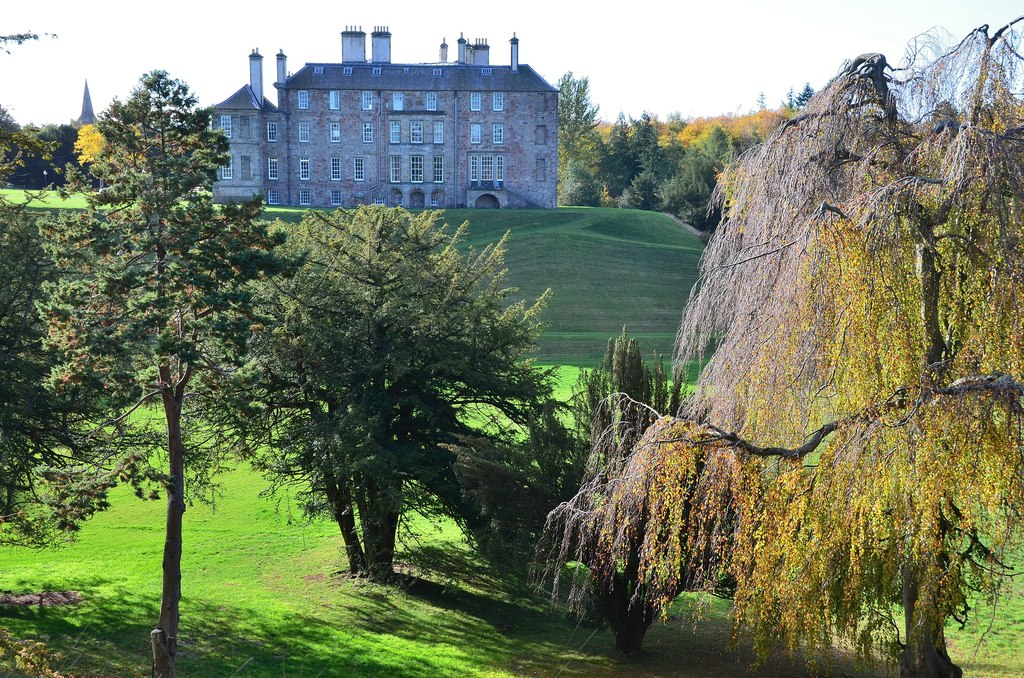
View from northeast

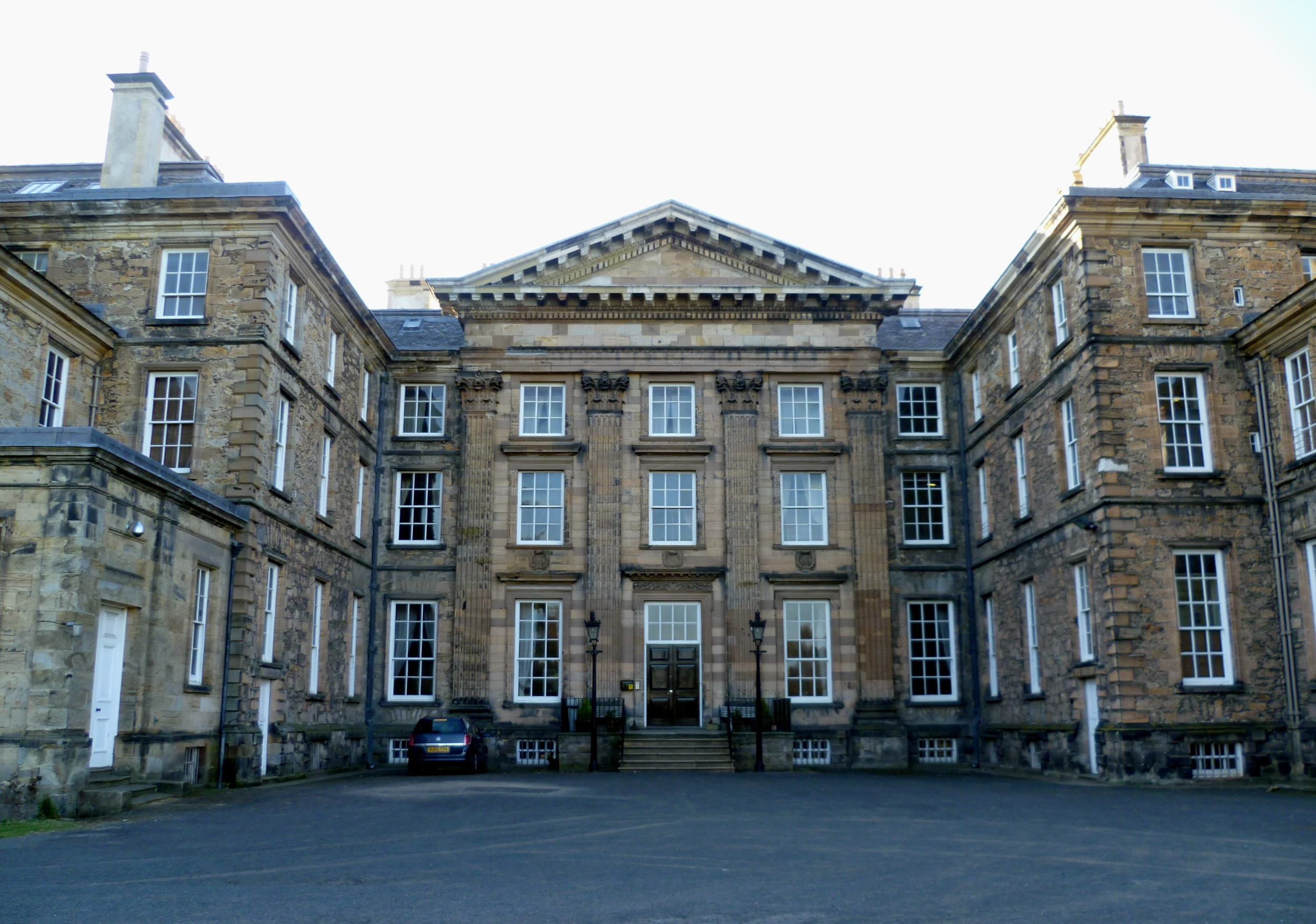
Front-view of Dalkeith House, 2011

Dalkeith Palace has not been lived in by the Buccleuch family since 1914, and in 1920 the palace gardens and glasshouses were let as market gardens. In the 1970s and early 1980s, Dalkeith Palace was used as a research and development office by the computer firm International Computers Ltd. (ICL), which leased the palace until 1983. From 1985 it was leased to the University of Wisconsin system for a study abroad programme. Approximately 60–80 students a semester lived in the palace, where they also took classes from UK and US faculty members. The University and Buccleuch Living Heritage Trust announced in July 2020 that the lease would end in January 2021.

== See also ==
- List of places in Midlothian
- Estate houses in Scotland
