= Fife Witches Trail =

Series of memorial plaques

The Fife Witches Trail is a series of plaques located along the Fife Coastal Path, commemorating the women executed as witches there in the 16th to 18th centuries. The plaques are located in the villages of Culross, Valleyfield and Torryburn.

The Trail is an initiative of the West Fife Heritage Network, led by local councillors Kate Stewart and Julie Ford. The plaques, illustrated discs cast in bronze, were created by Differentia Designs. The Trail was launched at a ceremony on Culross village green on 7 September 2020.

== Witch trials in Fife ==
The Fife Witches Trail commemorates the women who were accused of witchcraft and executed in Fife during the Scottish witch trials of the 16th to 18th centuries. Across Scotland, it is estimated that between 4,000 and 6,000 people were accused of witchcraft. Many were imprisoned and tortured until they confessed, then executed by burning, hanging or drowning. An estimated 380 people in Fife, most of them women, were accused of witchcraft in that period. Possibly the best known of the Fife accused is Lilias Adie, who was known as the Torryburn witch. The details of her case are recorded in the 1704 Kirk Session Minutes. She was accused of having sex with the devil and tortured until she confessed. Adie died while awaiting trial. Her body was buried in an intertidal grave on the mudflats of Torryburn beach under a heavy sandstone slab to prevent the devil reanimating her.

== Locations ==
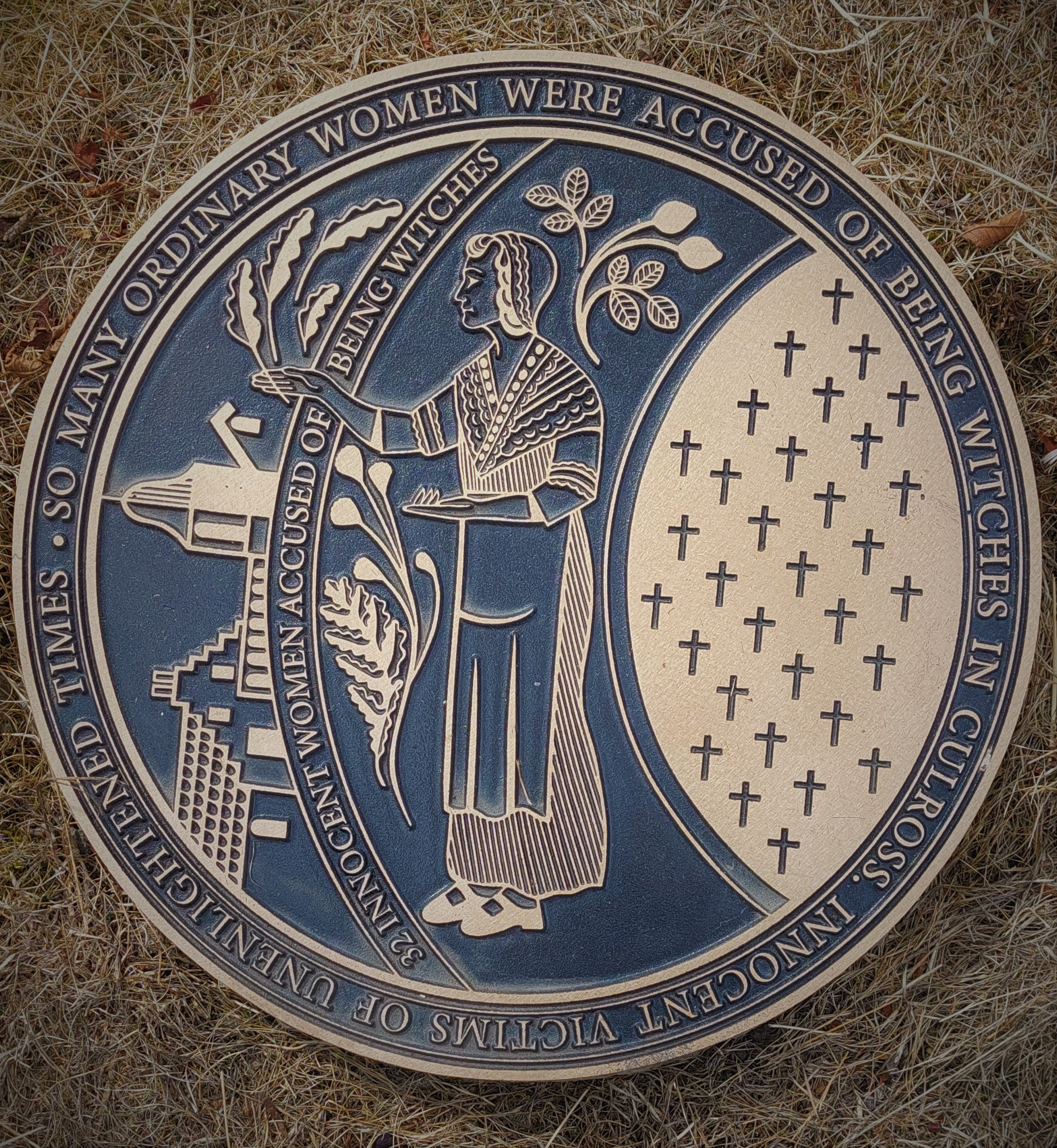
Culross plaque on the Fife Witches Trail

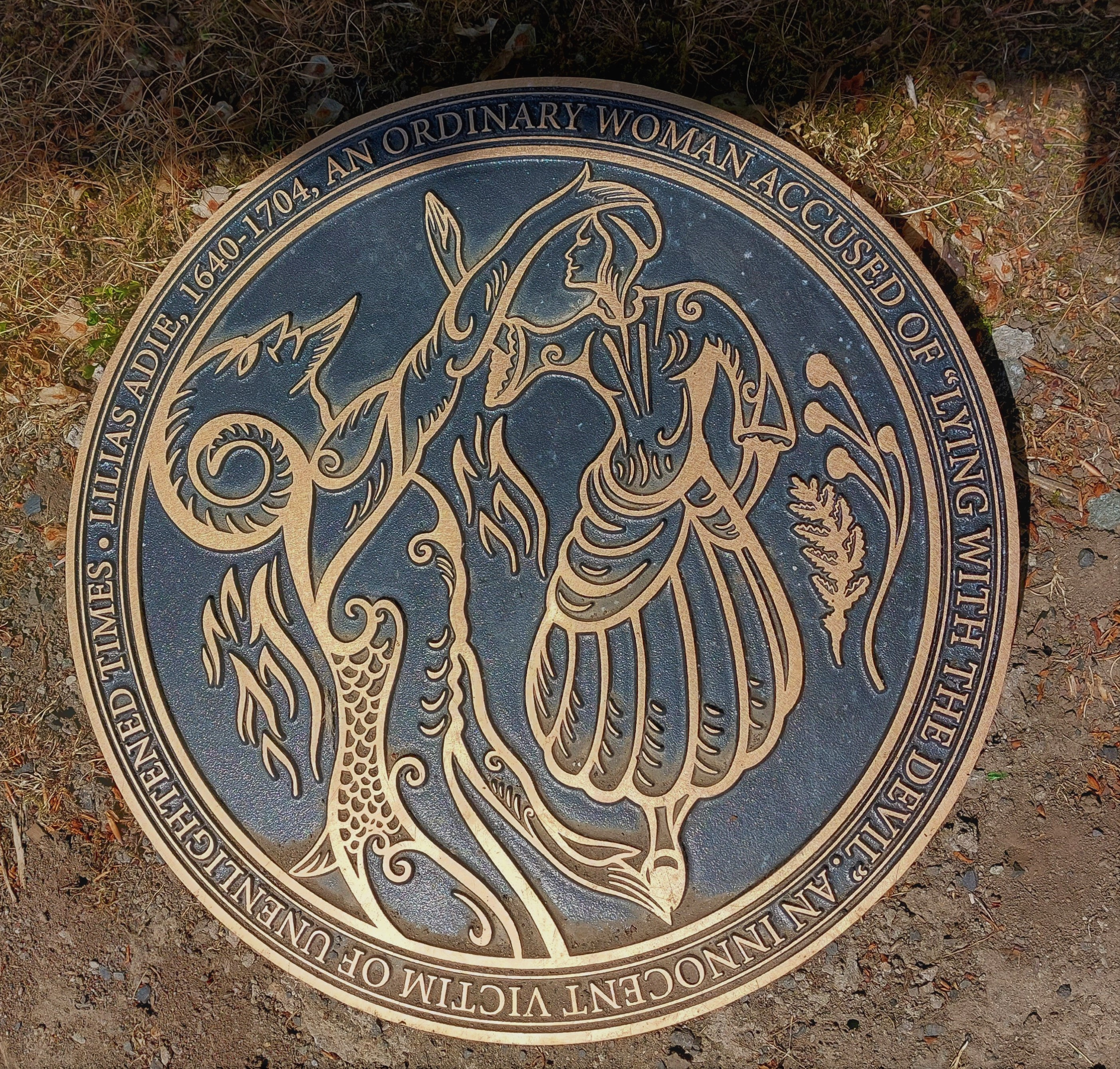
Valleyfield plaque on the Fife Witches Trail

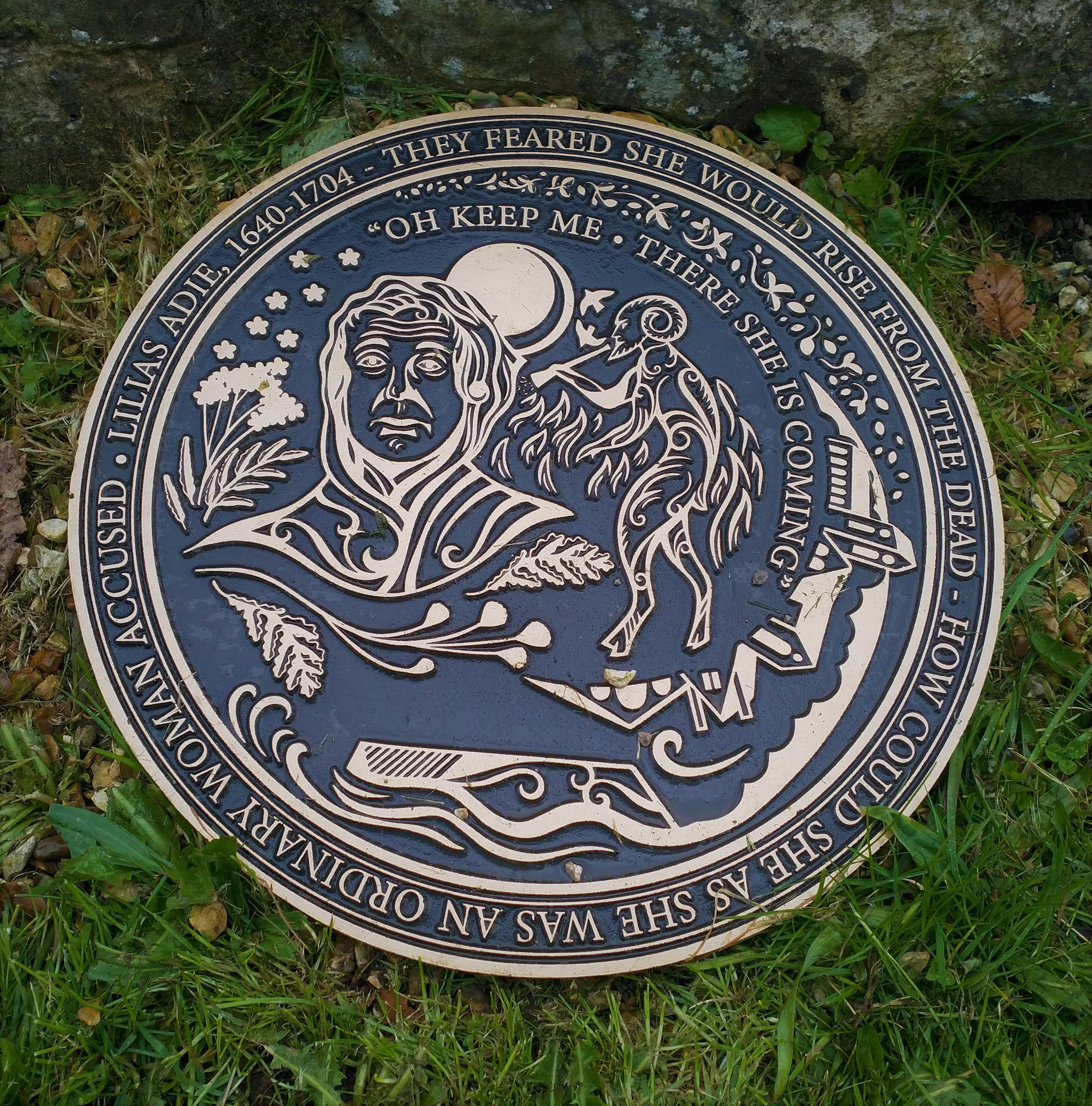
Torryburn plaque on the Fife Witches Trail

The plaque in Culross is located under an information board beside the bus stop on the village green. It faces the Town Hall, where the accused were held. It is illustrated with the figure of a woman holding herbal plants with reputed healing properties, notable buildings in the village and 32 crosses to represent the accused. It reads: "32 innocent women were accused of being witches. So many ordinary women were accused of being witches in Culross. Innocent victims of unenlightened times."

The second plaque is at the entrance to Valleyfield Wood, a slight detour off the coastal path. It is located under an information board, beside a bus parking area. It is illustrated with the figure of a woman dancing with a devil figure. It reads: "Lilias Adie 1640-1704, an innocent woman accused of "lying with the devil". An innocent victim of unenlightened times."

The Torryburn plaque marks Adie's burial place. It is located beside a low wall next to the railway bridge, overlooking the beach. From here, the stone slab under which Adie was buried is visible at low tide. The plaque is illustrated with Adie's face surrounded by herbal plants, notable buildings of Torryburn, a crescent moon and a devil figure blowing a horn. It reads: "Lilias Adie 1640-1704 - they feared she would rise from the dead - how could she as she was an ordinary woman accused. "Oh keep me. There she is coming"."
