= Aberdeen witch trials of 1596–1597 =

Beginning of persecution of accused witches in Aberdeen

The persecution of accused witches in Aberdeen began during the Aberdeen witch trials of 1596–1597 when forty-five women and two men were accused of the offence in the city with 22 women and one man executed for having been found guilty of being witches.

For Professor Julian Goodare, "The records of trials for witchcraft in Aberdeenshire in 1597 have long been known as one of the fullest and most important collections of source-material on the subject in Scotland."

== History ==
In 1590 King James VI presided over a Witchcraft trial in North Berwick. This sparked a wave of similar trials throughout Scotland where at least 3,837 women and men were accused of witchcraft in the 16th & 17th century. James VI himself paid several visits to Aberdeen in 1582, 1589, 1592, 1594 and 1600.

Then in 1596, a family was arrested and the son, Thomas Leyis, confessed to meeting a group of witches at the Fish Cross in Aberdeen on Halloween night that year and dancing with the devil at midnight. This scared the city elders and its denizens that they had a serious problem on their hands. This case also involved his mother Janet Wishart who was convicted of 18 counts of witchcraft including: casting spells that caused her neighbours to fall ill; making a brown dog attack her son-in-law following an argument; and using a corpse hung on a gallows to source the ingredients for her magic. By dismembering said corpse. Both mother and son were found guilty and executed by strangling and burning. Aberdeen City records note that it cost "3 pounds, 13 shillings and 4 pence" for the peat, tar and wood for Leyis’ pyre.

City records are "meticulous" and also include details of payments to blacksmiths in the area to procure iron rings and shackles needed to imprison accused witches at the Kirk of St Nicholas.

The women accused were said to be "often the poor, elderly women of a Community ‘whose poverty, sour temper or singular habits made them an object of dislike or fear to their neighbours". The Justice Court which presided over these women's trials, consisted of the Provost of Aberdeen, four baillies and a jury.

The trials were held in the city's Tolbooth. The city’s hangman had a set fee of £1-6s–8d and for that four witches could be killed in a single day.

=== The panics in Aberdeen and Aberdeenshire ===
Chris Croly, a historian at the University of Aberdeen, stated that Aberdeen’s Great Witch Hunt of 1597 should be seen as but one phase of a wave of witch persecutions across Scotland sparked by the witchcraft laws of King James VI but also that "it is often said that Aberdeen burned more witches than anywhere else — that may not be entirely accurate, but what is absolutely accurate is that Aberdeen has the best civic records of witch burning in Scotland, and so it can appear that way."

Further researching the period, Professor Bill Naphy of the University of Aberdeen, found the panic began in Dyce, just outside Aberdeen before spreading to the parish of Dunnotar, then the city of Aberdeen itself. From there the panic spread to Lumphanan and finally coming to Banff.

The executions themselves took place in the Gallowgate area of Aberdeen and were "spectacular events" according to Naphy, where the sentenced would be tied to a stake, strangled and burnt to death before large crowds of onlookers.

For Naphy, the Aberdeen and Aberdeenshire witch trials seemed to spread through family relationships: "someone who was accused in one village, had a family relation in another village and so the investigation followed accordingly.” Almost a dozen of the accused and killed came from the village of Lumphanan. This would have represented a huge proportion of the female population at the time.

== A prison for witches ==
St. Mary's Chapel dates back to the 15th century and is part of the Kirk of St Nicholas a historic church located in the city centre. It is also known as "The Mither Kirk" (mother church) of the city. Historians say that an iron ring set in a stone pillar in the chapel could be a direct link to the city of Aberdeen's dark history.

In restoring the chapel in 2016, Arthur Winfield, project lead for the OpenSpace Trust, stated that two places within the church had been equipped as a prison for witches during the Aberdeen witch hunt of 1590s: the stone-vaulted chapel of St Mary, and the kirk's tall steeple, which would have been, at that time, the tallest structure in the city.

Winfield attested that neither the stone chapel nor the tall steeple would have been warm in the winter of 1597 while those accused of witchcraft awaited their trial and their execution: "In the winter nowadays, the temperature gets down to 3 degrees [Celsius] in St Mary's Chapel, and I guess it would be even colder up in the spire."

Following the 2016 archaeological dig of the kirk grounds, Winfield expressed the plans were to redevelop the former "prison for witches" in St Mary's Chapel as a "contemplative space... that space will be kept as an area of peace and tranquility — essentially, it is going to be respected for the chapel that it was, and will be again."

== See also ==
- Janet Wishart
- Margaret Bane
- Survey of Scottish Witchcraft
