= Culross mercat cross =

Scottish memorial cross

- Culross market cross
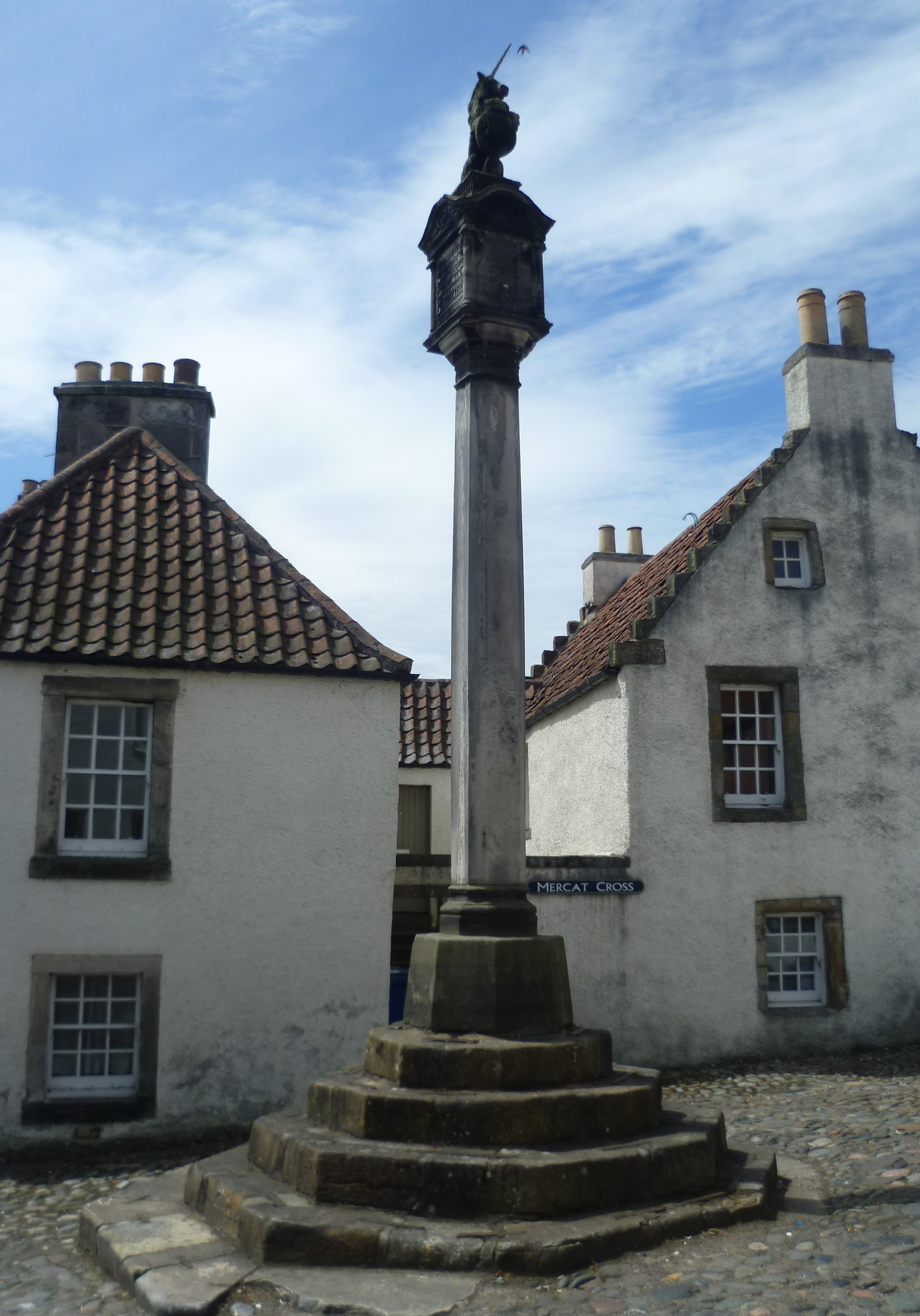
- The cross in 2013

- Location within Fife Location within Scotland
- 56.055600°N 3.628460°W
- Location: The Cross, Culross, Fife, Scotland

History
- Built: 16th century (base)

Site notes
- Architect(s): John William Small (1902 replacement shaft and capital)

Culross mercat cross is located in Culross, Fife, Scotland. Now Category A listed, its base dates to the original 16th-century mercat cross. Its shaft and capital, meanwhile, are 1902 replacements, the work of John William Small (architect) and Alexander Neilson (sculptor).

The cubical head has decorations on each face:

- Northeast: Culross Burgh arms with the date of the burgh's 1588 creation
- Southeast: the provost's initials and inscription ("Restored by the Honourable Sir James Sivewright of Tulliallan, 1 July 1902, and John Cunningham of Balgownie Provost")
- Southwest: monogram of King James VI with crown
- Northwest: Sir James Sivewright's coat of arms, with his initials in tympanum

A unicorn surmounts the capital.

== Architectural detail ==
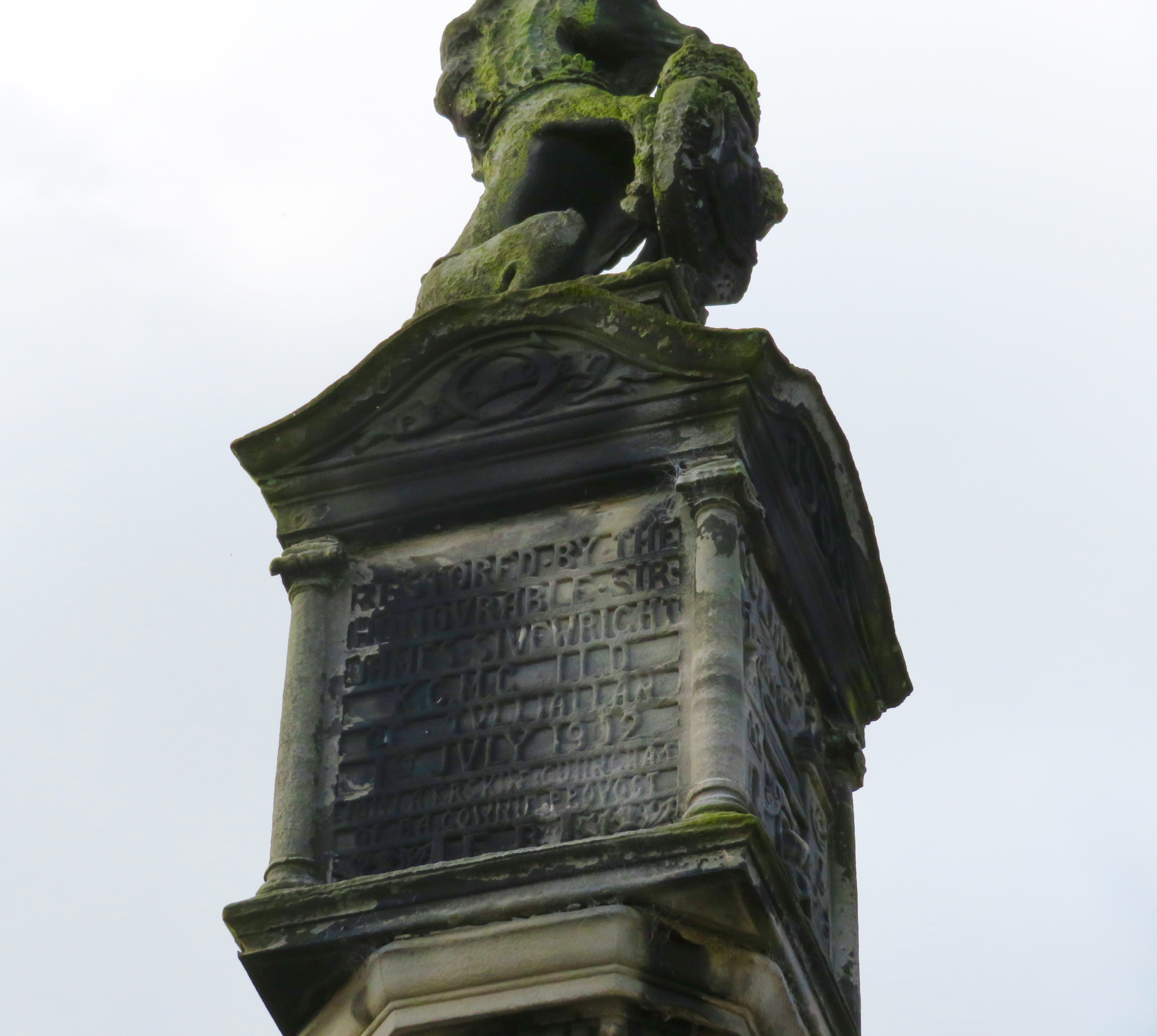
The southeastern face and unicorn of the head of the cross

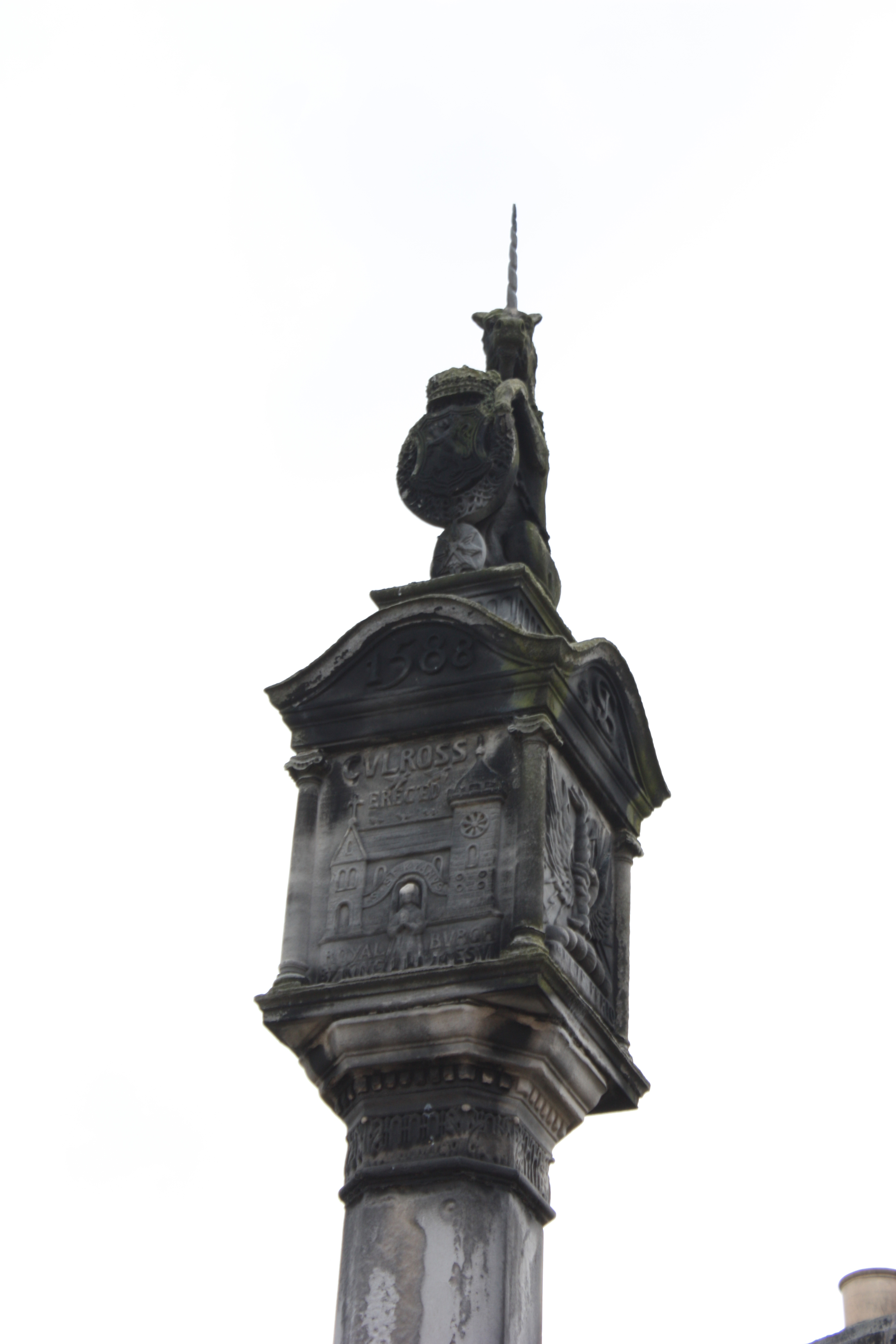
The northeastern face

== See also ==
- List of listed buildings in Culross, Fife
- List of Category A listed buildings in Fife
