= Culross Town House =

Municipal Building in Culross, Scotland

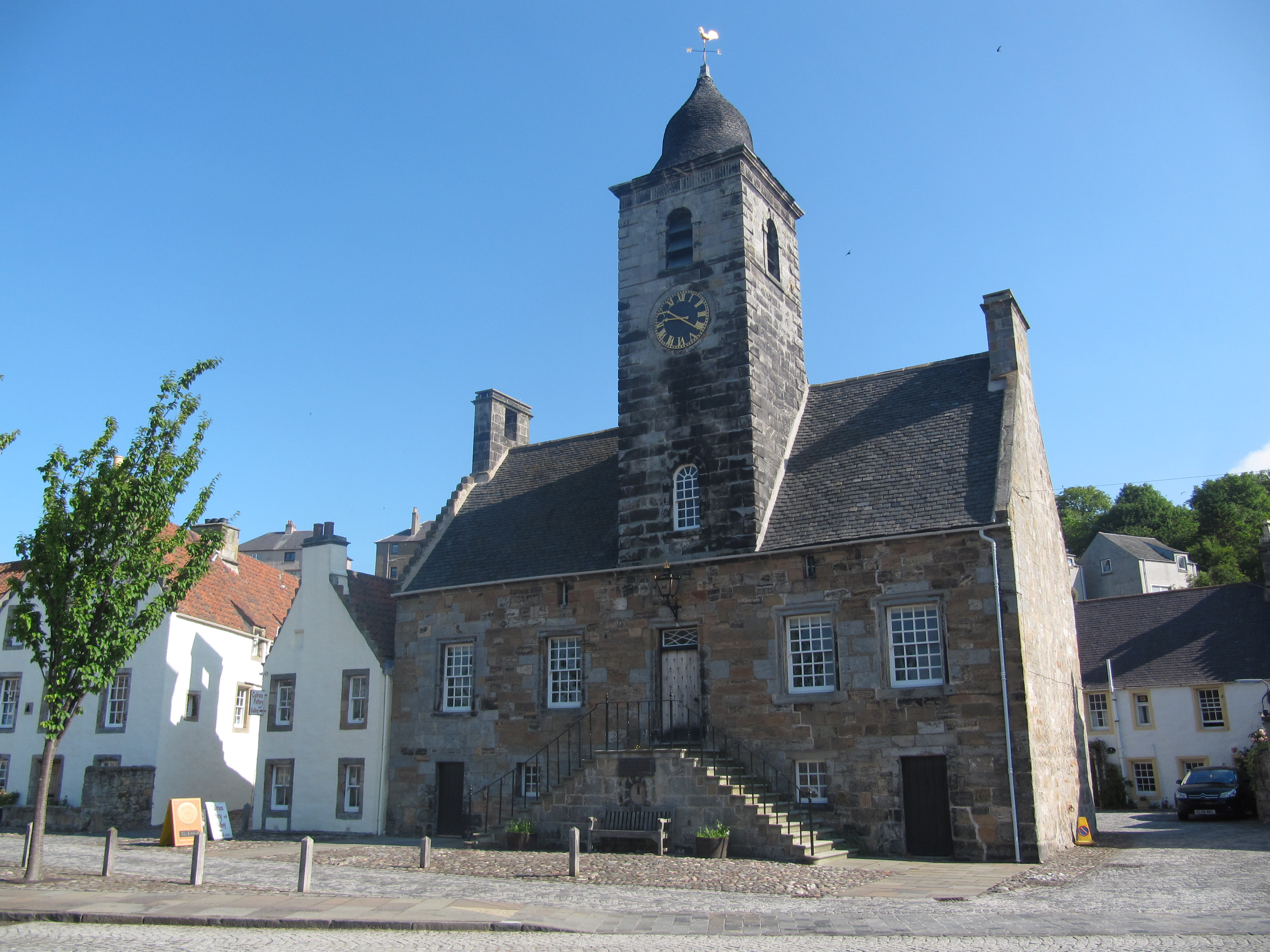
- The building in 2013

- Shown in Fife Culross Town House (Scotland)
- 56.055311°N 3.63023°W
- Location: Culross, Fife

History
- Built: 1626 (400 years ago)

Site notes
- Architectural style: Scottish medieval style

Listed Building – Category A
- Official name: Culross, Sandhaven, Culross Town House
- Designated: 12 January 1972
- Reference no.: LB23994

Culross Town House, also known as Culross Tolbooth, is a municipal structure in the Sandhaven area of Culross, Fife, Scotland. The building, which now serves as a visitor centre, is Category A listed.

== History ==
The town house was commissioned to replace an earlier tolbooth on the same site. It was designed in the Scottish medieval style, built in sandstone and was completed in 1626. The design involved a symmetrical main frontage of five bays facing Back Causeway; there was an external double forestair containing a blind oculus leading up to a central doorway with a rectangular fanlight on the first floor. The staircase was flanked, on the ground floor, by two small windows and, beyond that, by two small doorways. The first floor was fenestrated with four square-headed sash windows. A three-stage clock tower was installed in 1783: the first stage involved a round headed window, the second stage featured a clock designed and manufactured by Laurence Dalgleish and the third stage featured a louvered opening. The whole structure was surmounted by a cornice, an ogee-shaped dome and a weather vane. Internally, the principal rooms on the first floor were a council chamber (on the west side) and a reception room (on the east side) and a debtors' prison; the ground floor was occupied by cells for the incarceration of criminals. It is likely that Lilias Adie of nearby Torryburn was among the many women accused of witchcraft who were held in the cells in the garret. The only source of light were the small windows below the roofline and whatever sunlight shone through the slate roof.

A wooden panel painted with the royal coat of arms of King Charles I was installed above the fireplace in the reception room on the first floor. Stone panels to commemorate the lives of the Scottish merchant, Sir George Bruce of Carnock, and the Scottish soldier, Sir George Preston of Yalleyfield, were installed in the same room.

A tron, which had been installed outside the town house for merchants to weigh their goods, was replaced in the 19th century. In the mid-20th century, a plaque was installed at the top of the double forestair to commemorate the life of John Alistair Erskine Cunningham Jr of Balgownie (1869–1934), who had served as provost of the burgh for 42 years. The building was renovated to a design by Ian G. Lindsay & Partners between 1957 and 1959.

The building continued to serve as the headquarters of the burgh council for much of the 20th century, but ceased to be the local seat of government when the enlarged Dunfermline District Council was formed in 1975. The building was subsequently presented to the National Trust for Scotland for use as a visitor centre. The ground floor was converted into an exhibition area and a room designated for use as a National Trust gift shop. A plinth surmounted by a bust, depicting Admiral the Earl of Dundonald, which had been designed by the sculptor Scott Sutherland and initially installed at the entrance at Rosyth Dockyard, was relocated to the front of the town house just to the west of the tron, on the closure of the naval base in the late 1990s.

== Gallery ==
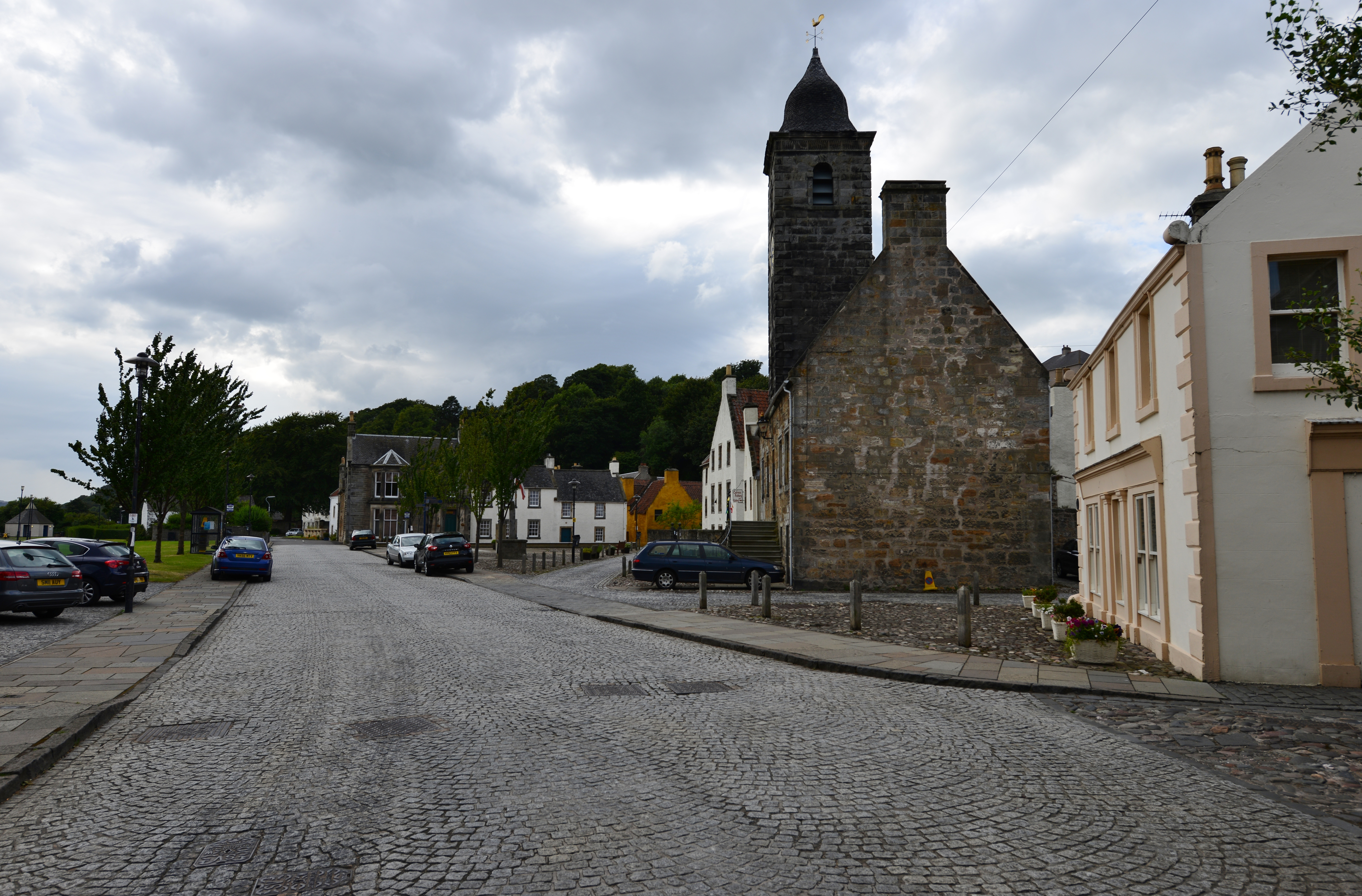
Eastern elevation, 2014

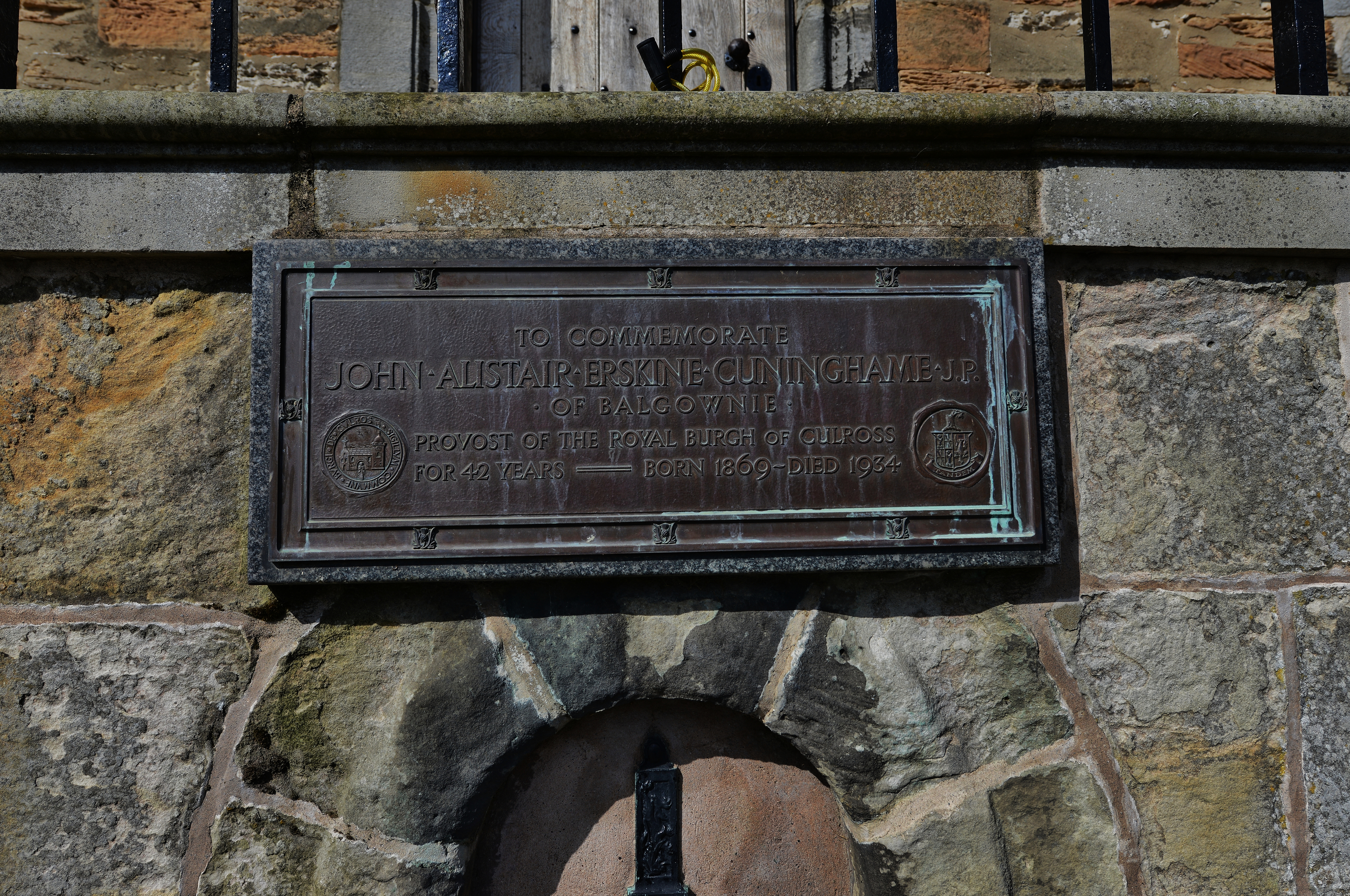
Commemorative plaque to John Alistair Erskine Cunningham Jr

== See also ==
- List of listed buildings in Culross, Fife
- List of Category A listed buildings in Fife
