= Amy L. Juhala =

Amy Lynne Juhala (1969–2024) was an American historian and teacher. Her published works concerned Scotland and the court of James VI and I.

Amy Juhala was born in Philadelphia. She studied for a PhD at the University of Edinburgh with Julian Goodare and Michael Lynch. Her thesis, "The Household and Court of King James VI of Scotland" (2000), remains a useful resource for historians and is frequently cited for its use of the unpublished treasurer's accounts and other manuscript sources, and for the identification of royal servants. Juhala's thesis also adds nuance to historians' understanding of the development of the court and privy chamber in England after the Union of the Crowns. She taught at the University of Mary and Bismarck State College in North Dakota.

== Selected publications ==
- "For the King Favours Them Very Strangely", Miles Kerr-Peterson and Steven J. Reid, James VI and Noble Power in Scotland (Routledge, 2017).
- "An Advantageous Alliance: Edinburgh and the Court of James VI", Julian Goodare & Alasdair A. MacDonald, Sixteenth-Century Scotland (Brill, 2008).
