= Meg Dow =

Scottish woman executed for witchcraft

- Died: April 1590; Castlehill, Edinburgh
- Cause of death: Capital punishment (strangled and burnt to death)
- Years active: 1580s
- Known for: Scottish woman executed for witchcraft and infanticide

Meg Dow or Margaret Dow (died 1590), was a Scottish woman executed for witchcraft. She was charged with infanticide and witchcraft in April 1590 and was subsequently executed at Castlehill, Edinburgh. The Survey of Scottish Witchcraft database lists her age at the time as 9 years old.

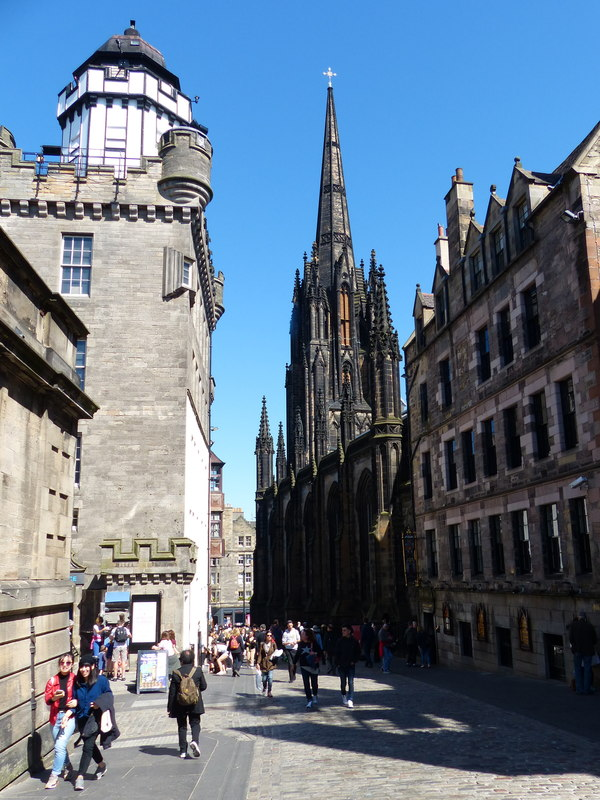
Castlehill, Edinburgh

== Biography ==
Dow was from Gilmerton south east of Edinburgh. She was charged with the 'crewell murdreissing of twa young infant bairns," by magic and was questioned on 14 April 1590 and again on 20 April 1590.

Justice Depute, James Wardlaw, was the advocate prosecuting the case. The central trial began on 28 April 1590 with Thomas Craig and James Wardlaw investigating.

Dow told the trial that she had met "a meikle black man" on the road between Dalkeith and Edinestoune when she was carrying "the sark of a dying child". This was at 12:00am.

She confessed that “the Innemy”, Satan, had marked her by biting her little finger and causing it to bleed conspicuously.

== Death ==
Dow was convicted and her sentence was to be executed along with another accused, Janet Pook.

She was 'wirreit [worried, strangled] at ane staik' and 'thairefter hir bodie brunt in asses' for the crimes of child murder, sorcerie and witchcraft at Castlehill, Edinburgh on 28 April 1590.
