= James Sivewright =

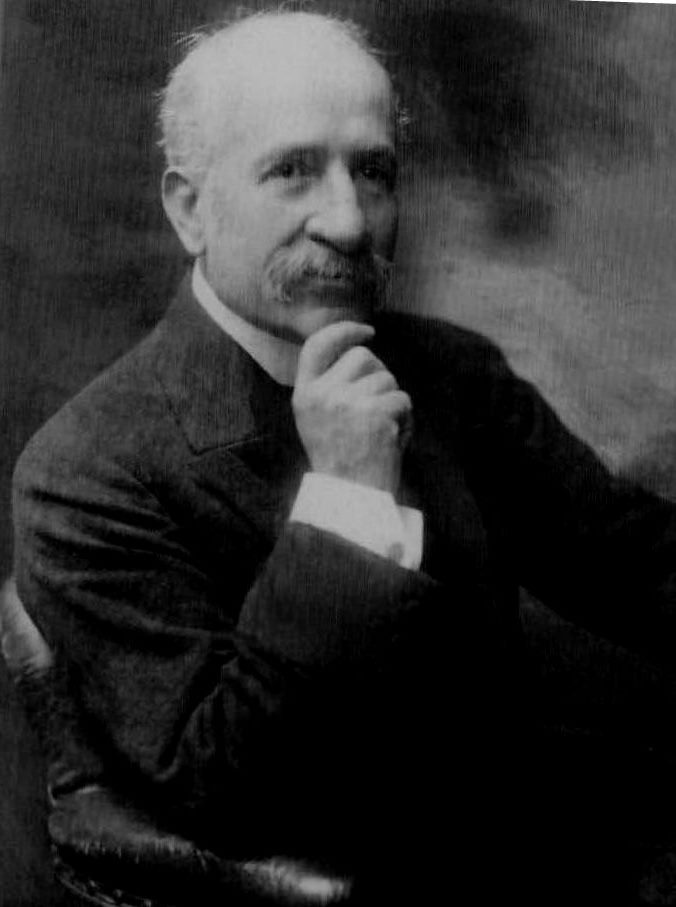
Sir James Sivewright. From a photograph taken in May 1902.

Sir James Sivewright K.C.M.G. (c. 1848–10 September 1916) was a businessman and politician of the Cape Colony. He was a strong political ally of Cecil Rhodes and, as his cabinet minister, was implicated in the "Logan" corruption scandal that led to the fall of the first Rhodes government.

== Early life ==
James Sivewright was born in Fochabers, Scotland. Graduating from the University of Aberdeen, he entered the British Postal Service and co-authored the Textbook in Telegraphy, a book that became a standard text book on the topic for a considerable time.

== Telegraphy in the Cape ==
After he worked in India for its telegraph service, he emigrated to the Cape Colony in 1877 and became the general manager of telegraphy. He would retire from the service in 1885. The Cape had recently wrested a degree of independence from Britain under the "Responsible Government" system, and its first Prime Minister John Molteno was embarking on a massive expansion in the country's infrastructure. Sivewright was one of the telegraphy experts which the Cape government imported to develop a telecommunications system for the country. From 1877 Sivewright helped to plan and construct the telegraphy networks for the Cape Colony, and then, up until 1881 likewise for the Transvaal, the Natal Colony and the Orange Free State.

== Politics and Cecil John Rhodes ==
In 1887 Sivewright became involved in politics, after he joined the Afrikaner Bond in Cape Town, and he was elected as the Bond representative of Griqualand East in 1888.

Subsequently, he became immensely influential as an agent of the rising Imperialist politician Cecil Rhodes, within the Afrikaner Bond. He went on to act as an intermediate between Rhodes, and the Bond leader "Onze Jan" Hofmeyr. As Rhodes's right-hand man, he secured the Bond's support for Rhodes to take power in 1890 and become Prime Minister of the Cape.

Throughout his career, Sivewright habitually mixed business and politics. In 1891 he secured an agreement for the Cape Government Railways, that gave them a 2-year monopoly on traffic to and from the new goldfields of the Transvaal. As a reward, Sivewright received a knighthood.

He also built increasingly powerful links with the principal mining tycoons of southern Africa, such as Barney Barnato. Sivewright's business links gained increasing criticism from opposition politicians who accused him of massive corruption.

== The Logan corruption scandal (1892–3) ==
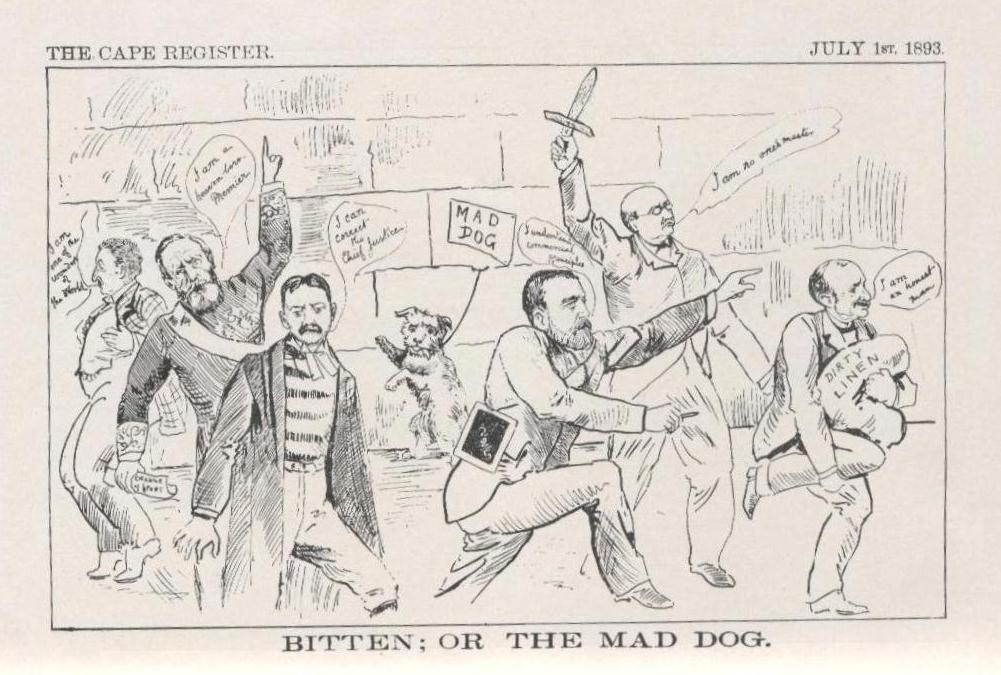
An 1893 cartoon on the Logan Scandal. James Sivewright is depicted on the far right, clutching his dirty linen and proclaiming his honesty.

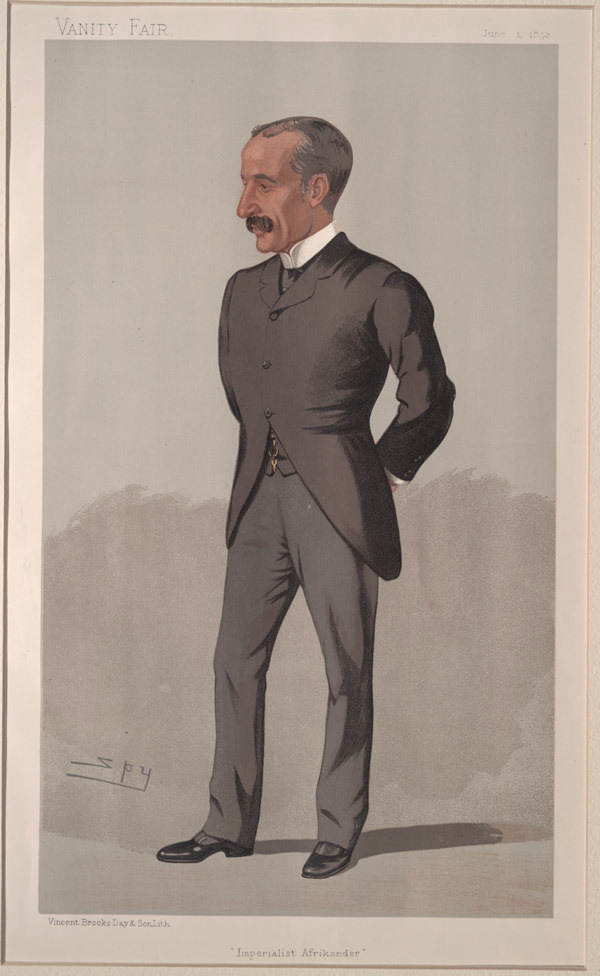
Drawing of James Sivewright, Vanity Fair, 1893.

In 1892, he secured a government contract for his friend and associate James Logan which involved a 15-year monopoly on the catering for the nation's Government-run Railway system.

The deal was immediately discovered, and a collection of the country's most powerful liberal politicians, including JW Sauer, John X. Merriman and James Rose-Innes, protested and attacked the deal. Eventually the Rhodes government was forced to cancel the deal, however it nonetheless compensated Logan massively with government money. The liberal politicians then refused to be part of any government that included Sivewright, however Sivewright still had the support of Rhodes and his connections with the Afrikaner Bond which were essential for the maintenance of the Rhodes government. The surrounding scandal, and the stand-off that it caused, led to the fall of the first Rhodes Government.

Sivewright then moved to act as a discrete and unofficial railway diplomat.

== Progressive Party ==
After the Jameson raid split apart the Cape political scene and was subsequently revealed to have been a plot by Cecil Rhodes, the Afrikaner Bond finally split with Rhodes, whose second government fell. Faced with the choice, Sivewright joined the Rhodesian, pro-Imperialist "Progressive Party". The move paid off when Rhodesian Prime Minister Gordon Sprigg gained power, and Sivewright was awarded the Commission of Crown Lands and Public Works.

He won a seat for Stellenbosch in 1898, standing as a Progressive, but it was soon discovered that his agents had been bribing voters, and he was consequently deposed.

== Later life ==
Sivewright then traveled back to Britain but nonetheless kept strong political and business links with South Africa. In 1899, he arranged the Bloemfontein Conference, and he had diverse financial interests in southern Africa that he kept for the rest of his life.

His reputation for massive corruption never quite faded, and liberal activist Olive Schreiner recounts that: "when both he (Rhodes) and Sivewright came forward to shake hands, I turned on my heel and went to my house."

In 1914, he was briefly taken prisoner by the Germans at the beginning of the First World War, when he was captured while recuperating in Nuremberg.

== See also ==
- Culross mercat cross, on which he is honoured for its restoration
