= List of listed buildings in Culross, Fife =

This is a list of listed buildings in the parish of Culross in Fife, Scotland.

== List ==
Name	Location	Date listed	Grid ref. (Note: Sometimes known as OSGB36, the grid reference (where provided) is based on the British national grid reference system used by the Ordnance Survey. • "Guide to National Grid". Ordnance Survey. • "Get-a-map". Ordnance Survey.)	Geo-coordinates	Notes	LB number (Note: Historic Environment Scotland assign a unique alphanumeric identifier to each designated site in Scotland, for listed buildings this always begins with "LB", for example "LB12345".)	Image
Culross, 1C, 2C, 3C, 4C Sandhaven Including Outhouse And Garden Wall				56°03′18″N 3°37′48″W	Category C(S)	24043	Upload Photo
Culross, 3 Tanhouse Brae				56°03′21″N 3°37′42″W	Category B	24047	Upload Photo
Culross, Kirk Street, Coachman's Cottage				56°03′23″N 3°37′39″W	Category B	24050	Upload Photo
Culross, Balgownie House (Inchkeith School)				56°03′19″N 3°38′00″W	Category B	24062	Upload Photo
Culross, Culross Manse				56°03′30″N 3°37′34″W	Category B	23963	Upload Photo
Culross, Bessie Bar's Hall				56°03′20″N 3°37′53″W	Category B	23973	Upload Photo
Culross, Sandhaven, Bessie Bar Cottage				56°03′19″N 3°37′52″W	Category B	23979	Upload Photo
Culross, Sandhaven, January House				56°03′19″N 3°37′52″W	Category C(S)	23981	Upload Photo
Culross, 16 Sandhaven				56°03′19″N 3°37′52″W	Category B	23982	Upload Photo
Culross, Sandhaven, Culross Pottery And Gallery (Tron Shop)				56°03′20″N 3°37′50″W	Category B	23991	Upload Photo
Culross, Sandhaven, Culross Town House				56°03′19″N 3°37′49″W	Category A	23994	Upload another image See more images
Culross, 10 Back Causeway, Ferguson's House				56°03′20″N 3°37′46″W	Category B	23996	Upload Photo
Culross, 9 Back Causeway				56°03′19″N 3°37′46″W	Category B	23998	Upload Photo
Culross, 6 And 7 The Cross				56°03′20″N 3°37′43″W	Category B	24002	Upload Photo
Culross, 9 Mid Causeway				56°03′19″N 3°37′44″W	Category B	24007	Upload another image
Culross, 18C Low Causeway Including Garden Wall				56°03′19″N 3°37′36″W	Category B	24033	Upload Photo
West Entrance To Former Valleyfield Estate, Woodhead Street, High Valleyfield				56°03′38″N 3°36′23″W	Category B	3360	Upload Photo
1 Main Street (West End Cottage) Low Valley-Field				56°03′28″N 3°36′56″W	Category B	3347	Upload Photo
West Bath House, Bogside				56°06′00″N 3°39′16″W	Category B	3357	Upload Photo
Culross, Little Causeway, Building				56°03′19″N 3°37′41″W	Category C(S)	48807	Upload Photo
Culross, Low Causeway, Ailie House				56°03′18″N 3°37′41″W	Category B	24037	Upload Photo
Culross, The Cross, The Study				56°03′21″N 3°37′43″W	Category A	24045	Upload another image
Culross, Walls Bounding Back Causeway, Hagg's Wynd, Hagg's Steps, Back Lane To Erskine Brae And Bessie Bar's Hall And Ailie's Vennel				56°03′22″N 3°37′48″W	Category B	24060	Upload Photo
Culross, The Causeways: The Cross, Back Lane, Hagg's Wynd And Steps, Back, Mid And Little Causeways, Parts Of The Sandhaven And Ailie's Vennel				56°03′20″N 3°37′41″W	Category B	24061	Upload another image
Culross, Culross Park Boundary Walls At Gallows Loan, Kirk Street And Erskine Brae, Including East And West Entrance Gatepiers				56°03′23″N 3°37′43″W	Category B	24067	Upload Photo
Culross, Geddes House Including Garden Walls				56°03′30″N 3°37′34″W	Category C(S)	23968	Upload Photo
Culross, West Green, Weavers Cottage Including Boundary Walls				56°03′20″N 3°37′54″W	Category C(S)	23974	Upload Photo
Culross, Sandhaven, Mint Lea				56°03′20″N 3°37′48″W	Category B	23992	Upload Photo
Culross, Low Causeway, Chamberlayne's House Including Boundary Walls				56°03′19″N 3°37′47″W	Category B	23999	Upload Photo
Culross, 11 Mid Causeway Including Garden Wall				56°03′18″N 3°37′45″W	Category B	24008	Upload Photo
Culross, Little Causeway, Ark B				56°03′20″N 3°37′42″W	Category B	24011	Upload Photo
Culross, Little Causeway, Wee Causeway House Including Boundary Wall				56°03′20″N 3°37′41″W	Category B	24013	Upload another image
Culross, 17 Low Causeway, The Neuk, The Neuk (Top Flat) And The Ridge				56°03′19″N 3°37′37″W	Category C(S)	24019	Upload Photo
Culross, Low Causeway, St Kentigern's				56°03′21″N 3°37′33″W	Category B	24022	Upload Photo
Culross, Low Causeway, House (D Morgan)				56°03′21″N 3°37′32″W	Category B	24023	Upload Photo
Culross, Low Causeway, Whitbank				56°03′22″N 3°37′30″W	Category B	24026	Upload Photo
Culross, Low Causeway, St Serf's Including Garden Wall				56°03′22″N 3°37′29″W	Category B	24027	Upload Photo
10 ('Lucknow') And 11, 12, 13 ('Lucknow Villa') Main Street Low Valleyfield				56°03′31″N 3°36′49″W	Category C(S)	3358	Upload Photo
Blairburn Cottage, Dunimarle				56°03′17″N 3°38′26″W	Category C(S)	3345	Upload Photo
Dunimarle Castle				56°03′18″N 3°38′38″W	Category A	3349	Upload another image
Bordie Castle				56°03′47″N 3°40′44″W	Category C(S)	3352	Upload Photo
West Grange House				56°05′16″N 3°38′06″W	Category B	3355	Upload Photo
Ashes Farm And Farmhouse				56°03′57″N 3°38′19″W	Category C(S)	48796	Upload Photo
Culross, Back Causeway, Rowan Bank				56°03′20″N 3°37′46″W	Category B	48798	Upload Photo
Culross, 7 Mid Causeway, Bishop Leighton's House				56°03′19″N 3°37′44″W	Category A	48815	Upload Photo
Culross, West Green, Undercliff Including Garden Walls				56°03′20″N 3°37′56″W	Category B	48830	Upload Photo
Culross, Low Causeway, Abbey View And Post Office				56°03′17″N 3°37′43″W	Category B	24038	Upload Photo
Culross, Low Causeway, Red Lion Inn Including Boundary Walls				56°03′18″N 3°37′44″W	Category B	24039	Upload Photo
Culross, Low Causeway, Pear Tree Cottage Including Sundial And Garden Walls				56°03′18″N 3°37′46″W	Category B	24041	Upload Photo
Culross, 2 Tanhouse Brae				56°03′21″N 3°37′42″W	Category B	24046	Upload Photo
Culross, Newgate And Cat's Close Walls				56°03′26″N 3°37′36″W	Category B	24059	Upload Photo
Culross, Balgownie House, Garden Building				56°03′20″N 3°37′58″W	Category C(S)	24064	Upload Photo
Culross, Culross Abbey House				56°03′30″N 3°37′28″W	Category A	23964	Upload another image
Culross, West Green, Caldervale Including Walls				56°03′20″N 3°37′56″W	Category B	23970	Upload Photo
Culross, Sandhaven, Tron House (Mrs Porteous)				56°03′20″N 3°37′49″W	Category B	23989	Upload Photo
Culross, Sandhaven, Myrtle Bank				56°03′20″N 3°37′49″W	Category B	23993	Upload Photo
Culross, The Cross, Mercat Cross				56°03′20″N 3°37′42″W	Category A	24000	Upload another image See more images
Culross, 4 And 6 Mid Causeway, The Dundonald Arms Hotel Including Outhouse And Rear Wall				56°03′20″N 3°37′44″W	Category C(S)	24003	Upload Photo
Culross, Back Street, Stone Cottage				56°03′20″N 3°37′38″W	Category B	24016	Upload Photo
Culross, Low Causeway, St Mungo's Cottage Including Wall And Outbuilding				56°03′25″N 3°37′15″W	Category B	24028	Upload Photo
Culross, Low Causeway, Orchard View Including Garden Wall				56°03′21″N 3°37′30″W	Category C(S)	24032	Upload Photo
Culross, Low Causeway, Thistle Cottage				56°03′18″N 3°37′40″W	Category C(S)	24035	Upload Photo
Ness View (18, 19, 20, 21 Main Street) Low Valleyfield				56°03′32″N 3°36′43″W	Category C(S)	3359	Upload Photo
Culross, Back Causeway, Hatta Cottage				56°03′20″N 3°37′46″W	Category B	48797	Upload Photo
Culross, Culross Abbey House Policies, Stables And Gatepiers				56°03′30″N 3°37′18″W	Category B	48804	Upload Photo
Culross, West Green, Wrights House				56°03′20″N 3°37′55″W	Category B	48831	Upload Photo
Culross, 5 Tanhouse Brae				56°03′21″N 3°37′41″W	Category B	24048	Upload Photo
Culross, Tanhouse Brae, Forth View				56°03′22″N 3°37′40″W	Category C(S)	24053	Upload Photo
Culross, Balgownie House, Boundary Walls And Gate Piers				56°03′19″N 3°37′57″W	Category B	24063	Upload Photo
Culross, Culross Park House Including Store				56°03′26″N 3°37′42″W	Category B	24066	Upload Photo
Culross, Sandhaven, House (J Tarnawski)				56°03′19″N 3°37′52″W	Category B	23980	Upload Photo
Culross, Sandhaven, House (J Robertson), Including Wall				56°03′19″N 3°37′50″W	Category B	23986	Upload Photo
Culross, Sandhaven, The Tron				56°03′19″N 3°37′50″W	Category B	23988	Upload Photo
Culross, 20 Mid Causeway				56°03′18″N 3°37′46″W	Category B	24009	Upload Photo
Culross, Back Street, Little Sandhaven Including Well				56°03′20″N 3°37′40″W	Category B	24014	Upload Photo
Culross, Low Causeway, The Endowment Including Boundary Wall And Gatepiers				56°03′27″N 3°37′02″W	Category B	24031	Upload Photo
St Serf's Church, Dunimarle				56°03′17″N 3°38′31″W	Category B	3346	Upload another image
Old Dunimarle Castle				56°03′17″N 3°38′41″W	Category B	3348	Upload Photo
Bordie Byre				56°03′47″N 3°40′43″W	Category C(S)	3353	Upload Photo
Blair Castle (Carlow Convalescent Home For Miners)				56°03′16″N 3°39′27″W	Category A	46425	Upload another image
Culross, Low Causeway, The Haven Including Garden Wall				56°03′19″N 3°37′39″W	Category B	48809	Upload Photo
Culross, 4 Tanhouse Brae				56°03′21″N 3°37′41″W	Category B	48829	Upload Photo
Culross, Low Causeway, The Hollies Including Boundary Wall				56°03′18″N 3°37′41″W	Category B	24036	Upload Photo
Culross, Tanhouse Brae, Little Haven And The Cross Including Rear Wall				56°03′20″N 3°37′41″W	Category C(S)	24057	Upload Photo
Culross, Culross Abbey Church (Church Of Scotland) Including Churchyard And Boundary Walls				56°03′30″N 3°37′31″W	Category A	23960	Upload another image
Culross, Culross Abbey House Policies, West Lodge Including Gatepiers And Walls				56°03′34″N 3°37′41″W	Category B	23966	Upload Photo
Culross, West Green, Honeysuckle Cottage Including Garden Walls				56°03′19″N 3°37′53″W	Category C(S)	23977	Upload Photo
Culross, 7 Back Causeway, Daisybank Including Boundary Wall				56°03′20″N 3°37′45″W	Category B	23997	Upload Photo
Culross, 5 Mid Causeway, Bishop Leighton's House Including Boundary Wall				56°03′19″N 3°37′43″W	Category A	24006	Upload Photo
Culross, Little Causeway, The Nunnery Including Rear Yard Walls And Fireplace				56°03′20″N 3°37′42″W	Category B	24012	Upload Photo
Culross, Low Causeway, Bandar Abbas And Flat Above				56°03′19″N 3°37′38″W	Category B	24018	Upload Photo
Culross, Low Causeway, Rose Cottage				56°03′22″N 3°37′30″W	Category C(S)	24025	Upload Photo
Brankstone Grange				56°05′43″N 3°38′32″W	Category B	3362	Upload Photo
Blairhall House				56°04′14″N 3°36′48″W	Category B	3350	Upload Photo
West Grange Doocot At West Grange House				56°05′18″N 3°38′10″W	Category B	3356	Upload Photo
Culross, Low Causeway, Pond Cottage, Pond And Walls				56°03′24″N 3°37′08″W	Category C(S)	48814	Upload Photo
Culross, Low Causeway, Beechwood House				56°03′18″N 3°37′46″W	Category B	24040	Upload Photo
Culross, Tanhouse Brae, Snuff Cottage Including Garden Wall				56°03′22″N 3°37′39″W	Category B	24051	Upload Photo
Culross, Tanhouse Brae, Tanbrae House				56°03′21″N 3°37′41″W	Category B	24056	Upload Photo
Culross, Culross Abbey House Policies, Garden House Including Garden Walls, Terrace, Setts And Seat				56°03′31″N 3°37′19″W	Category A	23965	Upload Photo
Culross, West Green, Westerlea Including Boundary Walls				56°03′20″N 3°37′55″W	Category B	23971	Upload Photo
Culross, Sandhaven, Garage To North Of House (R Milne)				56°03′20″N 3°37′51″W	Category B	23985	Upload Photo
Culross, Sandhaven, House To North Of House (J Robertson)				56°03′20″N 3°37′50″W	Category B	23987	Upload Photo
Culross, 8 Mid Causeway				56°03′20″N 3°37′44″W	Category B	24004	Upload Photo
Blair Castle, Stable Block				56°03′17″N 3°39′22″W	Category B	6618	Upload Photo
Brankstone Grange Lodge				56°05′36″N 3°38′12″W	Category C(S)	3363	Upload Photo
East Grange Doocot At East Grange House				56°04′59″N 3°36′24″W	Category B	3351	Upload Photo
West Kirk, Dalgleish Mausoleum Including Boundary Wall And Gates				56°03′37″N 3°38′27″W	Category B	48832	Upload Photo
Culross, Low Causeway, House (J Laing) Including Garden Wall And Barn				56°03′18″N 3°37′47″W	Category B	24042	Upload Photo
Culross, Tanhouse Brae, Old Shoemaker's House				56°03′21″N 3°37′40″W	Category B	24054	Upload Photo
Culross, Kirk Street, East Wall				56°03′25″N 3°37′37″W	Category B	24058	Upload Photo
Culross, Balgownie House, Boathouse				56°03′17″N 3°37′59″W	Category B	24065	Upload Photo
Culross, West Green, The Old School House Including Garden Walls				56°03′20″N 3°37′54″W	Category C(S)	23972	Upload Photo
Culross, West Green, The House				56°03′19″N 3°37′54″W	Category B	23975	Upload another image
Culross, Sandhaven, Westerly Cottage				56°03′19″N 3°37′53″W	Category B	23978	Upload Photo
Culross, Sandhaven, House (R Milne)				56°03′20″N 3°37′51″W	Category B	23984	Upload Photo
Culross, Sandhaven, The Tron House				56°03′19″N 3°37′48″W	Category B	23995	Upload Photo
Culross, The Cross, The Ark				56°03′20″N 3°37′42″W	Category B	24010	Upload Photo
Culross, Low Causeway, Eley House Including Garden Wall				56°03′20″N 3°37′36″W	Category B	24020	Upload Photo
Culross, Low Causeway, Newgate House				56°03′21″N 3°37′31″W	Category B	24024	Upload Photo
Culross, Low Causeway, An Cala				56°03′18″N 3°37′40″W	Category B	24034	Upload Photo
Culross, Culross Park Lodge				56°03′30″N 3°37′38″W	Category C(S)	48805	Upload Photo
Culross, 22 Mid Causeway, Electricity Sub Station				56°03′18″N 3°37′46″W	Category B	48819	Upload Photo
Culross, Sandhaven, Sandhaven House Including Garden Wall				56°03′18″N 3°37′49″W	Category B	24044	Upload Photo
Culross, Tanhouse Brae, The Tanhouse Including Adjoining Walls On Erskine Brae And Tanhouse Brae				56°03′22″N 3°37′40″W	Category B	24049	Upload Photo
Culross, Tanhouse Brae, Preston View				56°03′22″N 3°37′40″W	Category C(S)	24052	Upload Photo
Culross, Parleyhill House Including Boundary Walls				56°03′31″N 3°37′35″W	Category B	23967	Upload Photo
West Kirk Including Churchyard And Boundary Walls				56°03′37″N 3°38′25″W	Category A	23969	Upload another image See more images
Culross, West Green, The House At West Green				56°03′19″N 3°37′54″W	Category B	23976	Upload Photo
Culross, Low Causeway, Algoa Bay House Including Garden Wall				56°03′20″N 3°37′39″W	Category C(S)	24017	Upload Photo
Culross, Low Causeway, Williamton House				56°03′20″N 3°37′35″W	Category B	24021	Upload Photo
Woodhead Farmhouse And Steading Including Boundary Walls				56°03′41″N 3°36′32″W	Category B	3361	Upload Photo
Bordie Doocot				56°03′44″N 3°40′43″W	Category C(S)	3354	Upload Photo
Culross, Back Street, Stephen Memorial Hall				56°03′20″N 3°37′40″W	Category C(S)	48799	Upload Photo
Culross, Culross Abbey House, East Lodge Including Gatepiers And Walls				56°03′38″N 3°36′42″W	Category B	48800	Upload Photo
Culross, Culross Park Lodge, Cottage				56°03′30″N 3°37′37″W	Category C(S)	48806	Upload Photo
Culross, Low Causeway, Cunninghame House				56°03′19″N 3°37′40″W	Category C(S)	48808	Upload Photo
Culross, Sandhaven, House (G Mackenzie)				56°03′19″N 3°37′53″W	Category B	48824	Upload Photo

== Key ==
The scheme for classifying buildings in Scotland is:

- Category A: "buildings of national or international importance, either architectural or historic; or fine, little-altered examples of some particular period, style or building type."
- Category B: "buildings of regional or more than local importance; or major examples of some particular period, style or building type, which may have been altered."
- Category C: "buildings of local importance; lesser examples of any period, style, or building type, as originally constructed or moderately altered; and simple traditional buildings which group well with other listed buildings."

In March 2016 there were 47,288 listed buildings in Scotland. Of these, 8% were Category A, and 50% were Category B, with the remaining 42% being Category C.

== See also ==
- List of listed buildings in Fife
