= Louise Yeoman =

Scottish historian

- Born: 1968 (age 57–58)
- Occupations: Historian and broadcaster

Academic background
- Education: University of St Andrews

Louise Yeoman (born 1968) is a historian and broadcaster specialising in the Scottish witch hunts and 17th century Scottish religious beliefs.

== Career ==
Yeoman completed a PhD at the University of St Andrews on the subject of the Covenanters. She worked for a year at the National Archives of Scotland and for a short time at Glasgow University Library. In 1992 she became curator of early modern manuscripts and cataloguer of the Wodrow Collection at the National Library of Scotland. In 1996 she was curator of the Library's Jacobite exhibition A Nation Divided. In 1996-97 she was seconded to BBC Scotland as writer and presenter of the BBC TV series Stirring Times.

From 2001 to 2003 Yeoman was co-director of the Survey of Scottish Witchcraft alongside Julian Goodare.

In 2014, interest in Lilias Adie's story encouraged Yeoman and Douglas Speirs, an archaeologist at Fife Council, to look for her burial site. Using 19th-century historical documents, they found a seaweed-covered slab of stone exactly where the documents described: in a group of rocks near the Torryburn railway bridge lay "the great stone doorstep that lies over the rifled grave of Lilly Eadie", and a rock with "the remains of an iron ring".

Yeoman is now a producer and presenter at BBC Radio Scotland, where she works on programmes including Time Travels and the Witch Hunt podcast series with Susan Morrison. She has spoken out about the courage of accused Scottish witches such as Adie.

Yeoman has spoken out in support of Scotland acknowledging the women killed as accused witches: “Do I think there should be a national statement that we think the witch hunt was wrong and we are sorry? Yes. Do I think there should be a national memorial? Yes, and local memorials.”

== Publications ==
- Survey of Scottish Witchcraft, 1563-1736. J Goodare, L Yeoman, L Martin, J Miller. (University of Edinburgh. School of History, Classics and Archaeology, 2010).
- Reportage Scotland: Scottish History in the Voices of Those Who Were There (Luath Press, 2005).
- "Hunting the rich witch in Scotland: high status witchcraft suspects and their persecutors, 1590–1650", in J. Goodare, ed., The Scottish Witch-Hunt in Context (Manchester: Manchester University Press, 2002), ISBN 0-7190-6024-9.
- Witchcraft in early modern Scotland: James VI's 'Demonology' and the North Berwick witches, Scottish Historical Review 81 (212), 267-269 (2002).
- Normand and Roberts (eds.), Witchcraft in Early Modern Scotland, Scottish Historical Review 81 (2), 267-269 (2002).
- Satan's conspiracy, magic and witchcraft in 16th century Scotland, HISTORY 87 (288), 606-606 (2002).
- Archie's Invisible Worlds Discovered-spirituality, madness and Johnston of Wariston's family, RECORDS-SCOTTISH CHURCH HISTORY SOCIETY 27, 156-186 (1997).
- The Devil as Doctor: witchcraft, Wodrow and the wider World, Scottish Archives 1, 93-105 (1995).
- Heart-work: emotion, empowerment and authority in covenanting times (University of St Andrews, 1991).
