= Survey of Scottish Witchcraft =

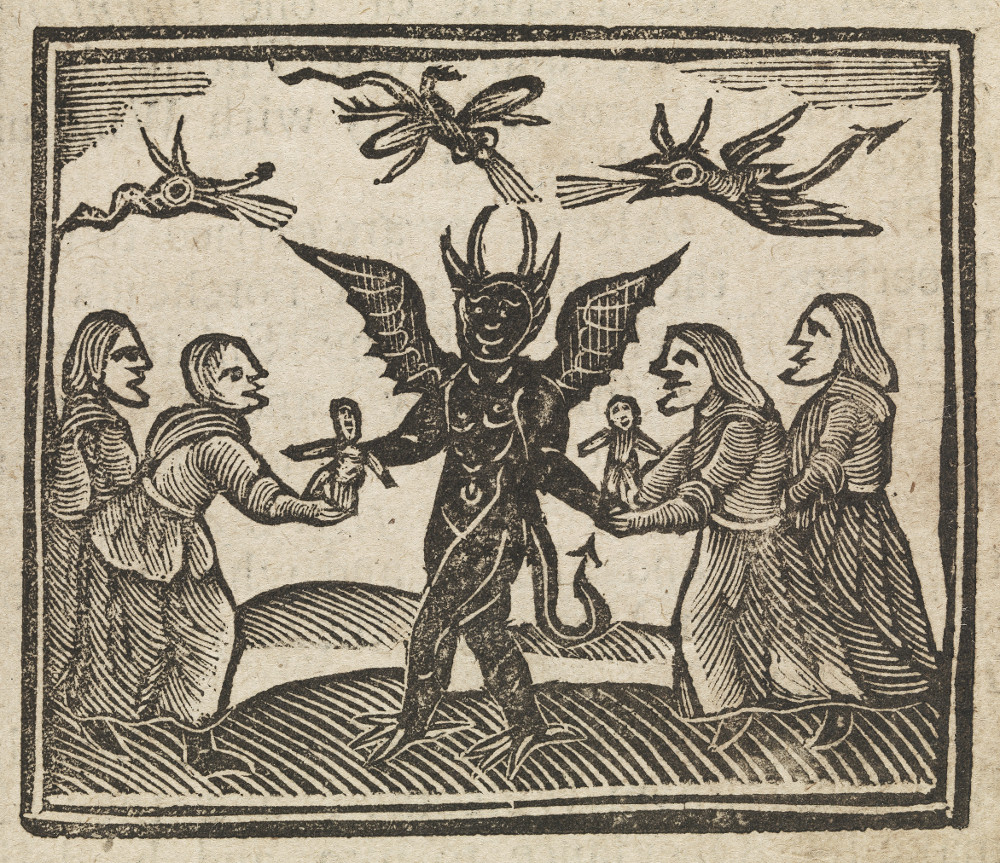
Woodcut image from Newes from Scotland (1591) depicting the devil with Agnes Sampson, one of the witches detailed in the survey

The Survey of Scottish Witchcraft is an online database of witch trials in early modern Scotland, containing details of 3,837 accused gathered from contemporary court documents covering the period from 1563 until the repeal of the Scottish Witchcraft Act in 1736. The survey was made available online in 2003 after two years of work at the University of Edinburgh by Julian Goodare, now a professor of history at the University of Edinburgh, and Louise Yeoman, ex-curator at the National Library of Scotland, now a producer/presenter at BBC Radio Scotland, with assistance from researchers Lauren Martin and Joyce Miller, and Computing Services at the University of Edinburgh. The database is available for download from the website.

== Media attention in October 2019 ==
The project received media attention in October 2019 for two reasons. Firstly, an interactive map showing where the accused witches resided was made public after work at the University of Edinburgh by Ewan McAndrew, Wikimedian in Residence, and Emma Carroll, a geology and physical geography undergraduate. As part of this project some of the data was also shared openly on Wikidata. Secondly, the Wikipedia biography of accused witch Lilias Adie was featured on the Wikipedia home page on Halloween after researchers at University of Dundee reconstructed her face based on photographs of her skull. They have placed a call for the return of her remains, which are now missing. Julian Goodare was called on to give comment on both these developments, which received attention in the national and international press.

== Previous surveys of Scottish Witchcraft ==
The survey built on the work of three previous surveys:

- Calendar of Cases of Witchcraft – George Fraser Black's 1938 publication of Calendar of Cases of Witchcraft in Scotland, 1510–1727.
- Source-Book of Scottish Witchcraft – 1977 publication funded by the Social Science Research Council.
- Scottish Witch Hunt Data Base – 1990s CD-Rom building on the Source-Book.

== See also ==
- Witch trials in early modern Scotland
- Scotland in the early modern period
- European witchcraft
- Lilias Adie
- Digital history
- Digital humanities
