= Dutch roof tiles =

Roofing material

The production of Dutch roof tiles started in the 14th century when the use of fireproof building materials was ordained by government. At that time houses were made of wood and with straw roofing, putting whole cities at risk to destruction by fire. Many small roof tile makers set up production near rivers where both clay and transportation were available and began to produce roof tiles by hand using wooden molds to fill the newly created demand. The area near the cities Alphen aan den Rijn, Belfeld, Coutrai, Deest, Echt, Tegelen, Utrecht, and Woerden were very popular.

Roof tiles were dried in special cabinets where wind-driven air was directed to and around the tiles. After the tiles dried, they were fired in an outdoor kiln. There was no control of kiln temperatures, leading to inconsistent dimensions and coloring. Most of these small early factories closed down or merged.

S-shaped pantiles were one of the first tile models put in production, starting in the 14–15th century, evolving into one of the most-used tiles in the world. The shape, size and smooth curve is unique on every roof. During the Industrial Revolution the Boom, Belgium region was the main source for handmade and extruded pantiles.

== Roof tileworks Gebr. Laumans ==
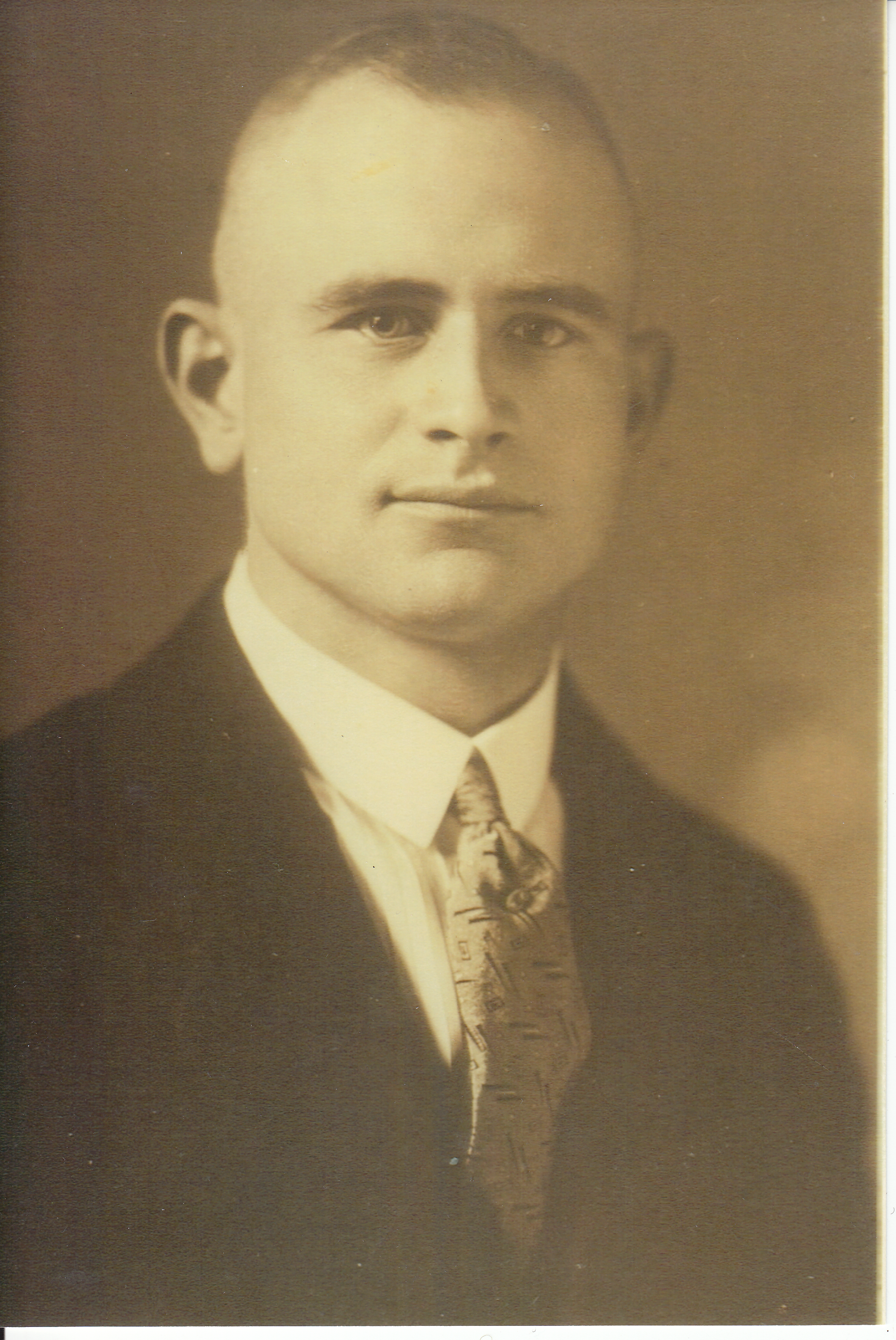
Quirin Laumans 25.10.1901-10.01.1988

The Gebr. Laumans roof tile works was located in the area around Tegelen. Quirinus and Caspar Laumans took over the business from one of the small manufacturers in 1864. Production started with 6 tile makers, 2 kilns, and 1 horse and wagon, at approximately 200.000 roof tiles a year (mainly pantiles). Quirinus Laumans expanded the business with additional factories in Bracht, Brüggen and Kaldenkirchen. Gebr. Laumans specialized in roof tile models such as Mulden, improved pantile, tuile du Nord, Roman, Bullet and interlocking tile.

== Roof tileworks Meeuwissen de Valk ==
The roof tile factory of Meeuwissen de Valk was founded in 1900 by Jos Meeuwissen when he took over the PHENIX tile factory. His successor, Willem Meeuwissen, was known for innovating and patenting of tile models earning de Valk a reputation for the development of new roof tile models and glazed colors. In the year of 1965 the total production was up to 7.000.000 roof tiles, most sold in the Netherlands but some also in Scandinavia.

== Roof tileworks Jos Kurstjens ==
The J. Kurstjens roof tile work was located near Tegelen and specialized in several roof tile models, including the Mulden, improved pantile Tuile du Nord, Roman, Bullet and interlocking tile. Using machine mixed clay, their tiles became known for their durability.
