= Dunnottar (disambiguation) =

Dunnottar or Dunottar may refer to:

- Dunnottar Castle, Scotland
- Dunnottar Parish Church, Stonehaven, Scotland
- Dunnottar, Manitoba, Canada
- Dunottar School, Surrey, England

== See also ==
- RMS Dunottar Castle, steam ship of the Union Castle Line
- MS Dunnottar Castle, passenger ship later renamed Victoria
