= Torryburn =

Coordinates: 56°03′N 3°33′W

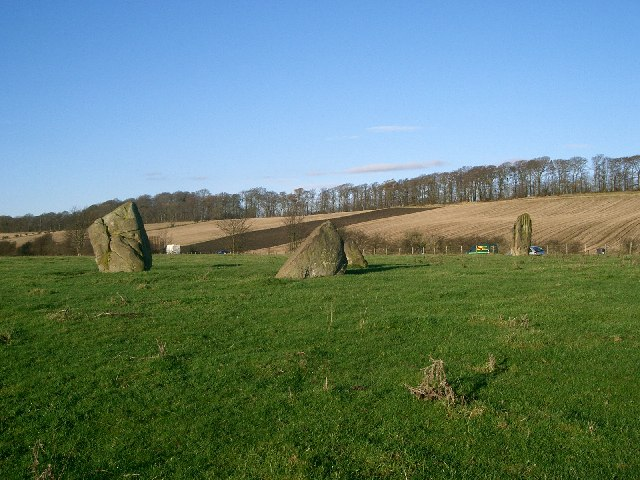
- Tuilyies standing stones, beside the A985 road above Torryburn

- Location within Fife
- Population: 1,030 (2020)
- Council area: Fife
- Country: Scotland
- Sovereign state: United Kingdom
- Police: Scotland
- Fire: Scottish
- Ambulance: Scottish
- UK Parliament: Dunfermline and Dollar
- Scottish Parliament: Dunfermline

Torryburn (previously called Torry/ Torrie) is a village and parish in Fife, Scotland, lying on the north shore of the Firth of Forth. It is one of a number of old port communities on this coast and at one point served as port for Dunfermline. It lies in the Bay of Torry in south western Fife.

The civil parish has a population of 1,587 (in 2011).

== History ==
The earliest mention of the village of Torry is in 1296 in relation to the church (rebuilt in 1800).

Lilias Adie is Fife's most famous victim of the witchcraft panic. She died in prison, it is presumed as a result of torture, and was buried on the shore at the village in 1704. Her resting place, under a huge sandstone slab to prevent the devil from gaining access, is the only known grave of an accused witch in Scotland, as the majority were burned.

Some of Adie's remains were dug up by grave robbers in 1852 and her skull was exhibited at various locations until it went missing in the middle of the last century. Old photographs of it were used in 2017 to construct a 3D virtual model showing the face of an older woman with a gentle demeanour.

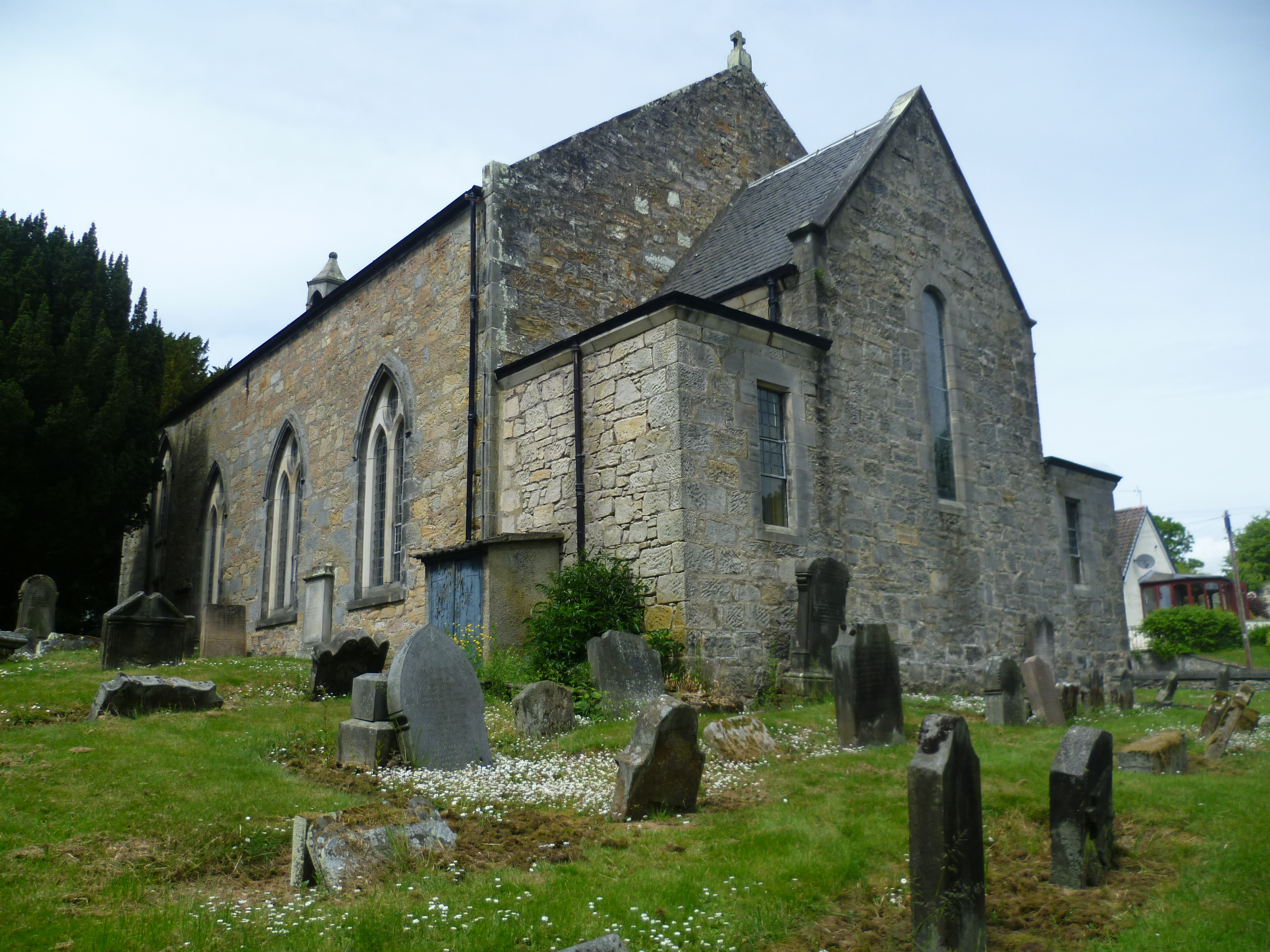
Torryburn Parish Church

Torryburn grew around coal mining in the 19th century. An early example of a colliery pumping engine designed by James Watt was set going here in 1778.

Edited from Westwood's Directory for the counties of Fife & Kinross published 1862: "Torryburn parish is bounded by the Firth of Forth, Perthshire, Saline, Carnock and Dunfermline. It measures about 5 miles by 3. There are small piers at Crombie and Torryburn, but their importance is not so great as when they formed the port for Dunfermline. The village of Torryburn stands on the coast. A number of the inhabitants are weavers, producing damasks for Dunfermline and cotton goods for Glasgow. The parish church is at Torryburn, and there is a Free Church at Torry."

In 2013 the parish church was put up for sale. And in 2024 was put up for sale as a residential building.

== Miscellaneous ==
Craigflower Preparatory School was based at Craigflower House in Torryburn, from 1923 until its closure in 1979. Craigflower House is a protected ("listed") building.

Torry Bay is designated as a Site of Special Scientific Interest (SSSI). Intertidal mudflats are an important estuarine habitat for birds and thousands are attracted to the reserve every year. The apparent barrenness of the shore is deceiving. It has been estimated that one square metre of mud may contain up to 60,000 laver spire snails or thousands of ragworms. These invertebrates provide essential food for the birds that overwinter at Torry Bay. In the winter you can see large numbers of great crested grebe, shelduck, wigeon, curlew, redshank and dunlin. Others like sandwich tern, ringed plover, ruff and greenshank occur on migration during the autumn. Washed up on the beach, you can also find cockles, mussels, periwinkles and tellins. Rockpools often contain butterfish, gobies, sea anemones, shore crabs and shrimps. Pockets of saltmarsh contain colourful flowers such as sea aster, thrift and scurvy grass. One plant that grows in the soft mud is the uncommon eelgrass, an important food source for the wigeon.

== Notable residents ==
- Alison Cunningham, the nurse to Robert Louis Stevenson, born here in 1822.

== Ministers ==
- Rev Dr John Gordon Lorimer DD (1804-1868) minister of the old kirk from 1829.
- Rev Alexander Lundie (born 1833) minister of the Free Church from 1867.

== See also ==
- List of places in Fife
