= Julian Goodare =

English historian (born 1957)

Julian Goodare FRHistS FHEA
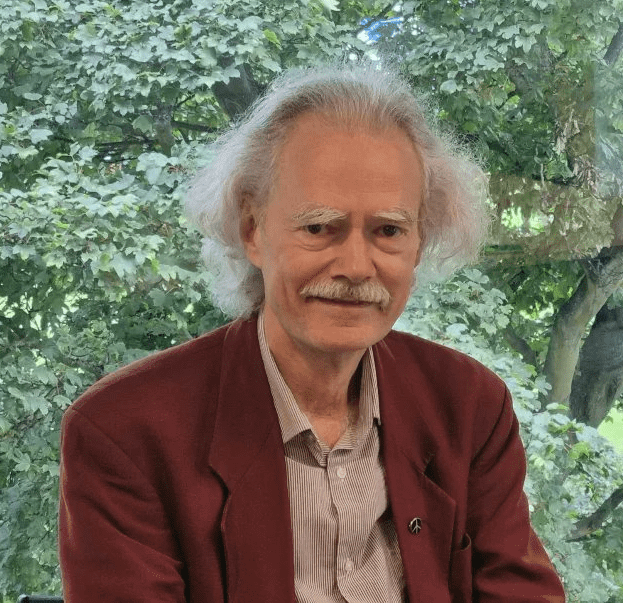
- Goodare in 2023
- Born: 12 October 1957 (age 69)
- Education: University of Edinburgh (PhD)
- Occupation: Professor

Julian Goodare (born 12 October 1957) FRHistS FHEA is a professor of history at the University of Edinburgh.

== Early life and education ==
Goodare was born on 12 October 1957. He studied at the University of Edinburgh in the 1980s, where he received an MA and PhD. Afterward, he engaged there as a postdoctoral fellow.

== Academic career ==
He lectured at the University of Wales and at the University of Sheffield. He returned to work at Edinburgh in 1998. He was the co-director of the Survey of Scottish Witchcraft alongside Louise Yeoman. In 2019, he called for a memorial to Scotland's tortured and executed witches.

Goodare has published articles and book chapters on crown finance in the early modern period. Subjects include the administration known as the Octavians, and the annual sums of money which Elizabeth I gave James VI of Scotland, which he argues ought to be known as the English subsidy. He explored the significance of the "Ainslie Bond", made in support of the Earl of Bothwell, in the light of Jenny Wormald's work on comparable bonds.

== Publications ==
- Adams, S. and Goodare, J. (eds.) (2014) Scotland in the Age of Two Revolutions. Woodbridge: Boydell and Brewer
- Boardman, S. and Goodare, J. (eds.) (2014) Kings, Lords and Men in Scotland and Britain, 1300-1625: Essays in Honour of Jenny Wormald. Edinburgh: Edinburgh University Press
- Goodare, J. (ed.) (2013) Scottish Witches and Witch-Hunters. Basingstoke: Palgrave Macmillan
- Goodare, J. 'The Debts of James VI of Scotland', Economic History Review, 62:4 (November 2009), pp. 926–952
- Goodare, J. and MacDonald, A. (eds.) (2008) Sixteenth-Century Scotland: Essays in honour of Michael Lynch. Leiden: Brill doi:10.1163/ej.9789004168251.i-476
- Goodare, J., Martin, L. and Miller, J. (eds.) (2008) Witchcraft and Belief in Early Modern Scotland. Basingstoke: Palgrave Macmillan
- Goodare, J. (ed.) (2002) The Scottish Witch-Hunt in Context. Manchester: Manchester Univ. Press
- Goodare, J. and Lynch, M. (eds.) (2000) The Reign of James VI. East Linton: Tuckwell Press
- Goodare, J. (1999) State and Society in Early Modern Scotland. Oxford: Oxford University Press
