= Culross =

Coordinates: 56.0554°N 3.6293°W

Culross: Scottish Gaelic: Cuileann Ros
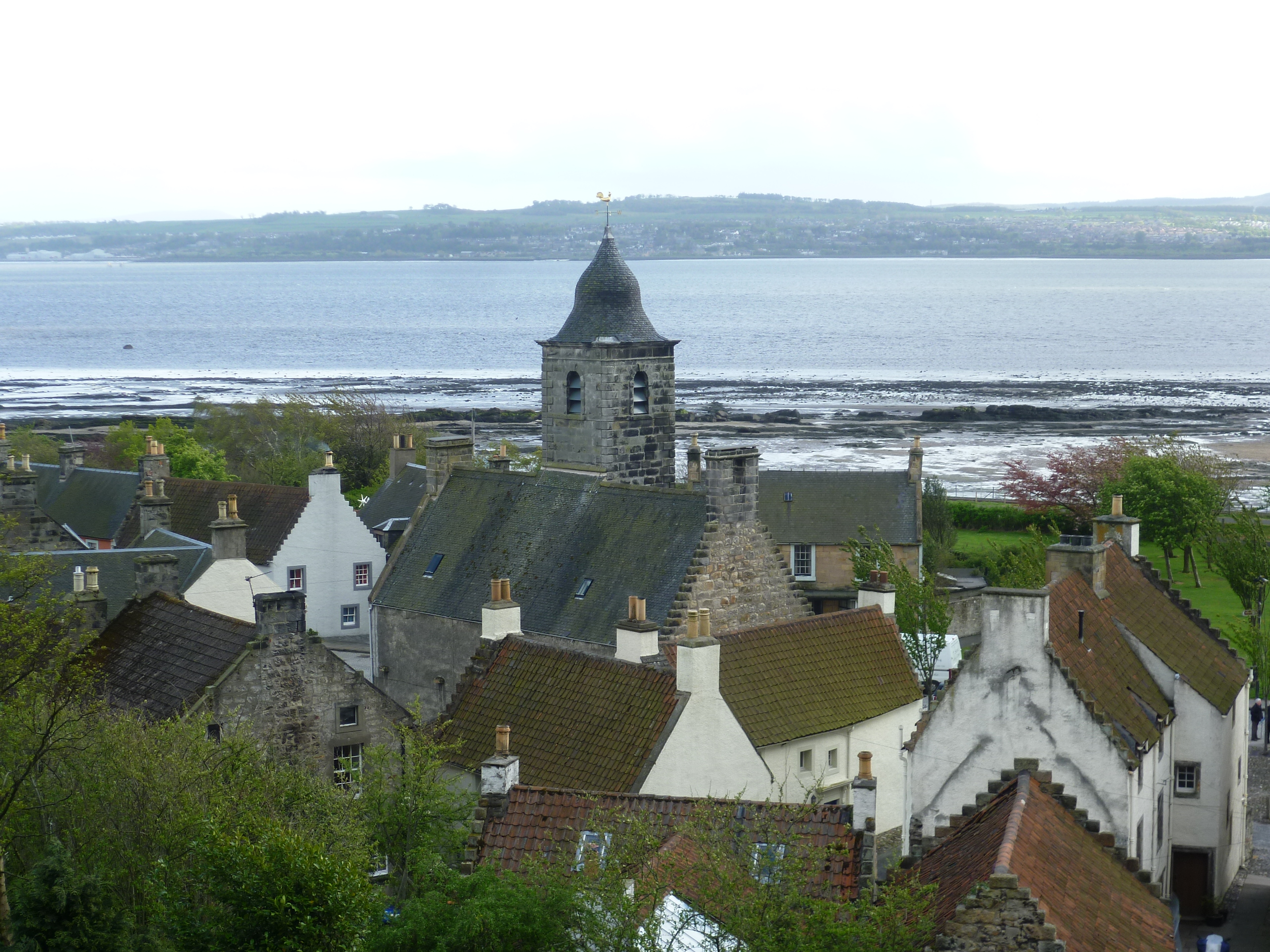
- Culross (including Culross Town House) and the Firth of Forth

- Location within Fife
- Population: 2,280 (2020 including Valleyfield)
- Community council: Culross
- Council area: Fife
- Lieutenancy area: Fife
- Country: Scotland
- Sovereign state: United Kingdom
- Post town: DUNFERMLINE
- Postcode district: KY12
- Police: Scotland
- Fire: Scottish
- Ambulance: Scottish
- UK Parliament: Dunfermline and West Fife
- Scottish Parliament: Dunfermline

Culross (/ˈkurəs/; Scottish Gaelic: Cuileann Ros, "holly point") is a village and former royal burgh, and parish, in Fife, Scotland.

According to the 2006 estimate, the village has a population of 395. Originally, Culross served as a port city on the Firth of Forth and is believed to have been founded by Saint Serf during the 6th century.

The civil parish had a population of 4,348 in 2011.

== Founding legend ==
A legend states that when the Brittonic princess (and future saint) Teneu, daughter of the king of Lothian, became pregnant before marriage, her family threw her from a cliff. She survived the fall unharmed, and was soon met by an unmanned boat. She knew she had no home to go to, so she got into the boat; it sailed her across the Firth of Forth to land at Culross, where she was cared for by Saint Serf; he became foster-father of her son, Saint Kentigern (or Mungo).

== West Kirk and Abbey ==
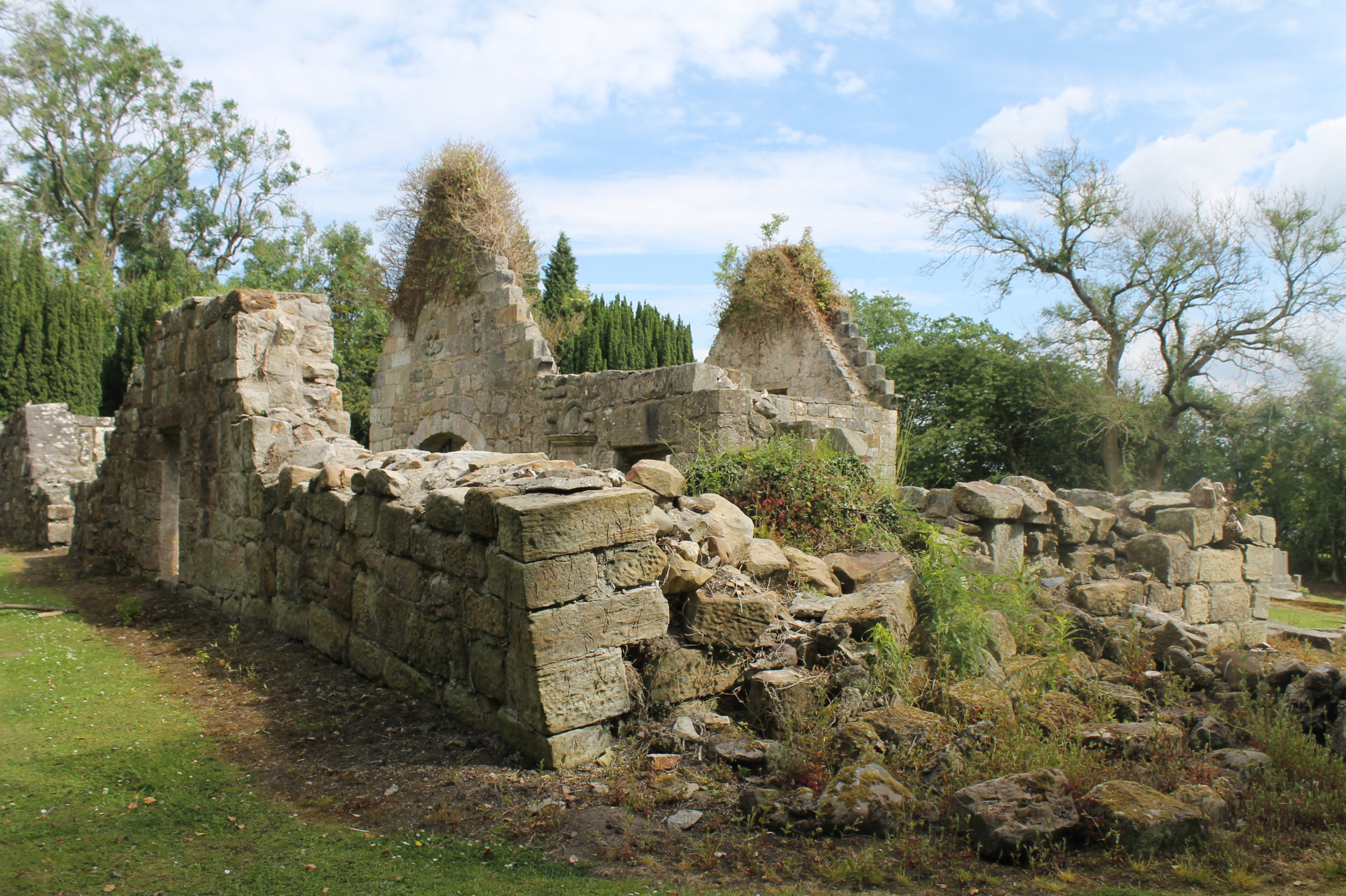
West Kirk of Culross viewed from west

The parish appears to have originally centred further west. The original church, later known as the "West Kirk" perhaps dates to the 11th century but was abandoned around 1500 and, therefore, did not come into play in 1560 at the time of the Reformation; however, it continued to be used for burials into the 20th century, being a long-established burial ground.

The Cistercian Abbey, dedicated to the Virgin Mary and Saint Serf, was built around one mile (1.5 kilometres) to the east in 1217, being founded by Malcolm, Earl of Fife. Part of this became the parish church in 1560 and was restored in 1905. A Chapel of St. Mungo (now wholly lost) was erected in 1503 by Robert Blackadder, Archbishop of Glasgow.

The first recorded minister was John Dykes (1567). He was replaced in 1593 by Robert Colville, of Linlithgow, who ministered until 1629, when replaced by his assistant Robert Melville. John Duncan MA took over in 1632. Duncan was pensioned off in 1642 but is recorded as joining the camp of General Leslie at Newcastle 1646–1647 during the English Civil War.

In the 17th century, its most notable minister was the Covenanter James Fraser of Brea, who took over in 1689.

== Industry ==
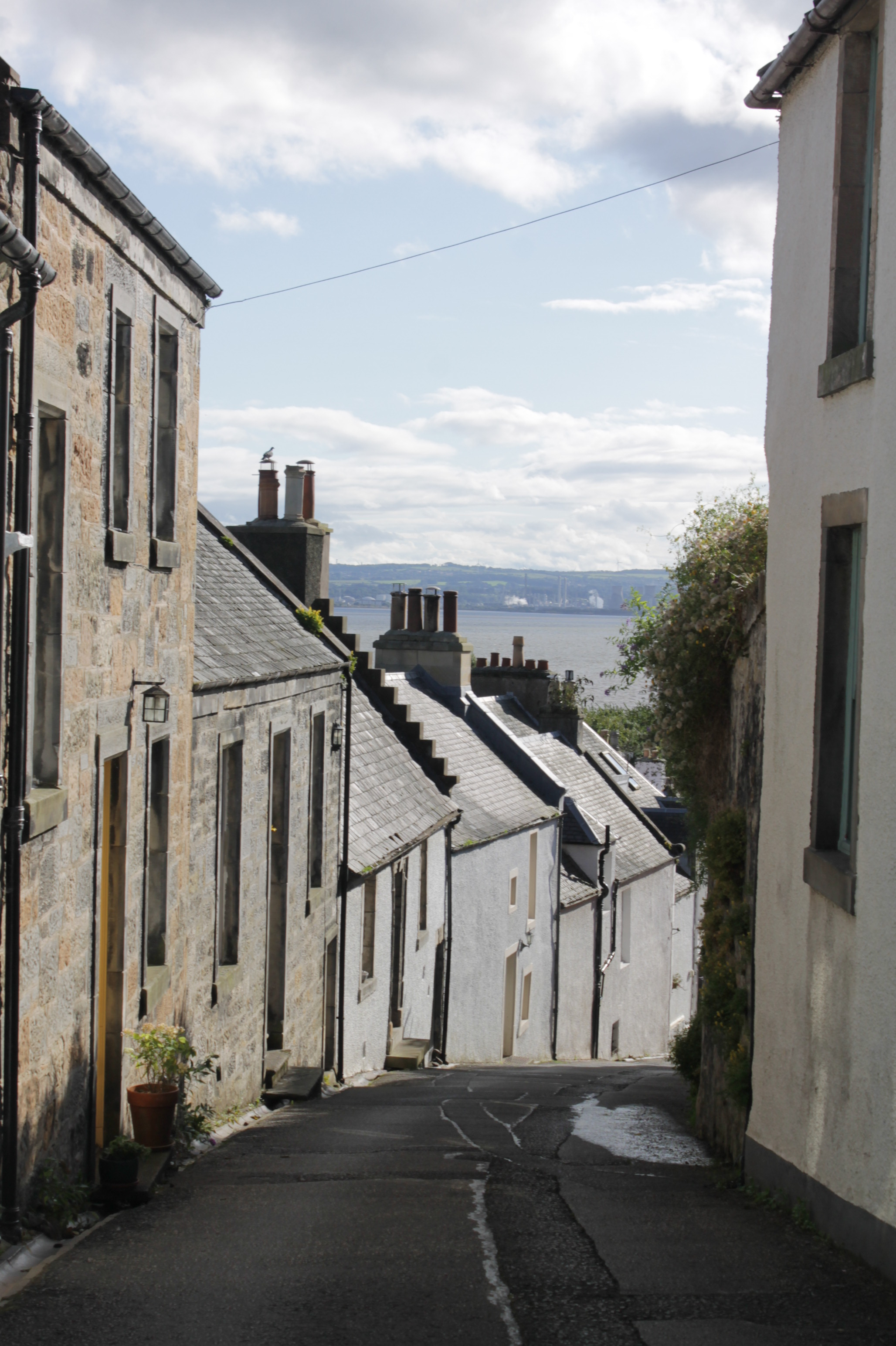
Tanhouse Brae, Culross, looking south to the Firth of Forth

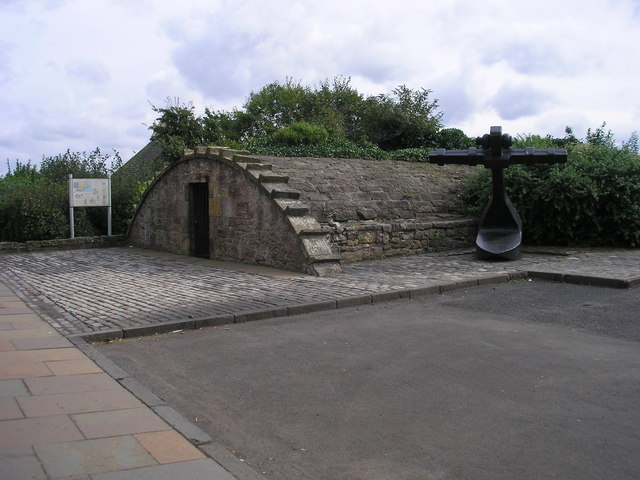
Anchor and storage building

During the 16th and 17th centuries, the town was a centre of the coal-mining industry. Sir George Bruce of Carnock, who built Culross Palace and whose elaborate family monument stands in the north transept of the Abbey church, established a coal mine at Culross in 1575. In 1590, he constructed the Moat Pit at Culross, the first coal mine in the world known to extend under the sea. The mine worked what is now known as the Upper Hirst coal seam, with ingenious contrivances to drain the constant leakage from above. This mine was considered one of the marvels of the British Isles in the early 17th century, described by one visitor, John Taylor, as "a wonder ... an unfellowed and unmatchable work", until the Moat Pit was flooded in a storm on 30 March 1625. In fact the Moat Pit was one of more than 20 shafts in and around the village sunk by Sir George, his son and grandsons between 1575 and 1676 when the mining migrated eastward as accessible reserves were exhausted. Culross Colliery, the collective term used for the pits around the village, was one of the largest, if not the largest, in Britain at this time. Some of the coal was used for housefires and industry but the greater part and the basis of the Bruce family wealth was used to evaporate seawater to make salt.

From 1575 salt panning was to become Culross's primary industry. There were seven salt pans at Culross in 1573. The Privy Council of Scotland allowed the proprietors, led by John Blaw and Alexander Eizatt, to export salt and they undertook to pay a duty in silver to the Scottish royal mint. In 1574, Regent Morton revoked licences to export salt because of a shortage of salt in Scotland. By the time of his death in 1625 Sir George Bruce had 44 salt pans in operation of which half were believed to be in Culross.

The need to make and maintain the pans and the picks, mattocks and other tools of mining created a need for skilled smiths. One offshoot of this was the town became known for its monopoly on the manufacture of girdles, a colloquial name for flat iron plates for baking over an open fire. It is argued that the engineering and metal working skills developed in this period make Culross the cradle of subsequent Scottish industry.

There was a considerable export trade by sea in the produce of these industries, and the prevalence of red roof tiles in Culross and other villages in Fife is thought to be a direct result of collier ships returning to Culross with Dutch roof tiles as ballast. In the late 18th century, Archibald Cochrane, 9th Earl of Dundonald, established kilns for extracting coal tar using his patented method.

The town's role as a port declined from the 18th century, and by Victorian times it had become something of a ghost town. The harbour was filled in and the sea cut off by the coastal railway line in the very early part of the 20th century. The outer pier has recently been the subject of restoration work.

== Heritage ==
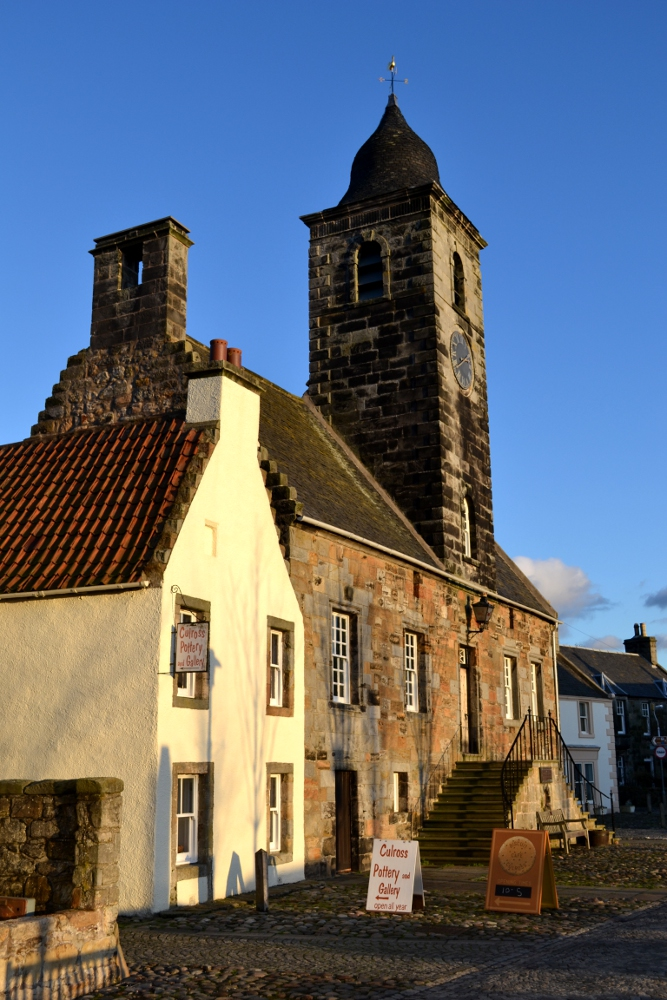
Culross Town House

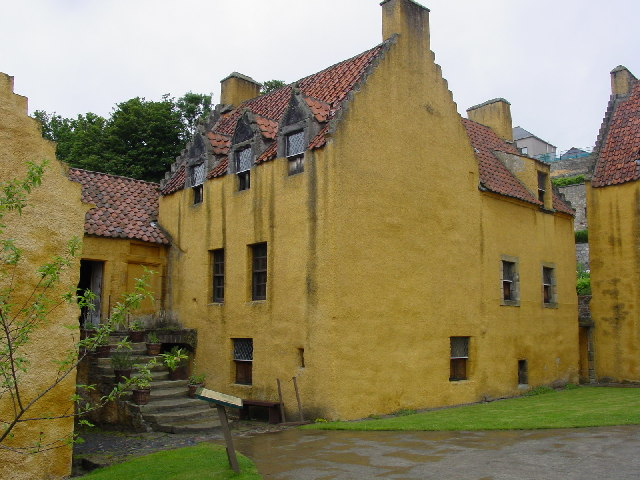
Culross Palace with its crow-step gable design

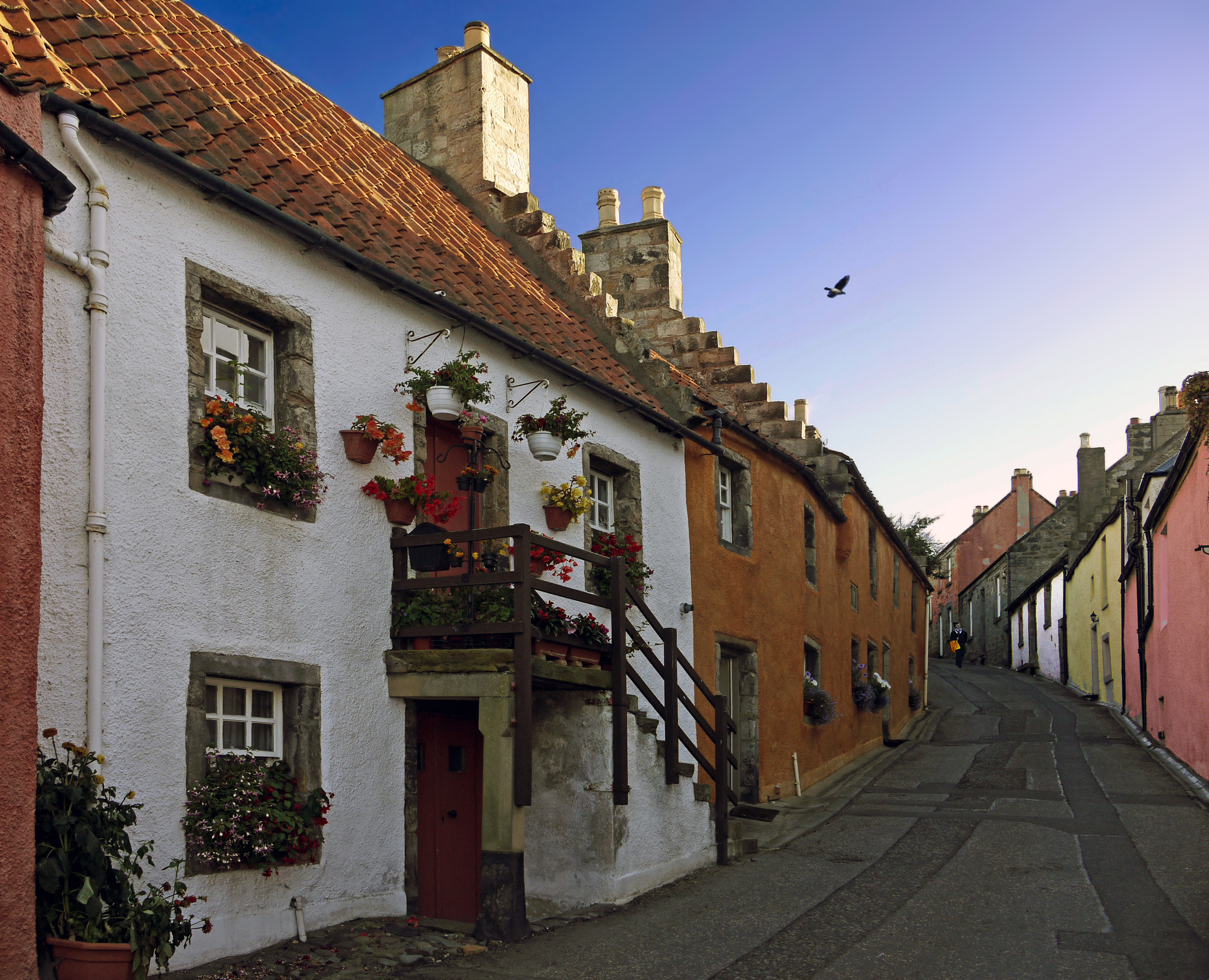
Street in Culross

Notable buildings in the burgh include Culross Town House, formerly used as a courthouse and prison, the 16th-century Culross Palace, 17th-century Study, and the remains of the Cistercian house of Culross Abbey, founded 1217. The tower, transepts and choir of the Abbey Church remain in use as the parish church, while the ruined claustral buildings are cared for by Historic Environment Scotland.

The West Kirk fell out of use before 1633, when it was noted as no longer serving as the parish church. The West Kirk was also the site where four women executed for witchcraft in 1675 were alleged to have congregated.

Just outside the town is the 18th-century Dunimarle Castle, built by the Erskine family to supersede a medieval castle.

Thomas Cochrane, 10th Earl of Dundonald, spent much of his early life in Culross, where his family had an estate. A bust in his honour, the work of Scott Sutherland, can be seen outside the Town House. He was the first Vice Admiral of Chile.

The war memorial was erected in 1921 to a design by Sir Robert Lorimer.

During the 20th century, it became recognised that Culross contained many unique historical buildings, and the National Trust for Scotland has been working on their preservation and restoration since the 1930s.

== Administration ==
Prior to the 1890s, the parishes of Culross and Tulliallan formed an exclave of Perthshire. It is within the Dunfermline and West Fife Westminster Parliamentary constituency.

== Culross as a location for filming ==
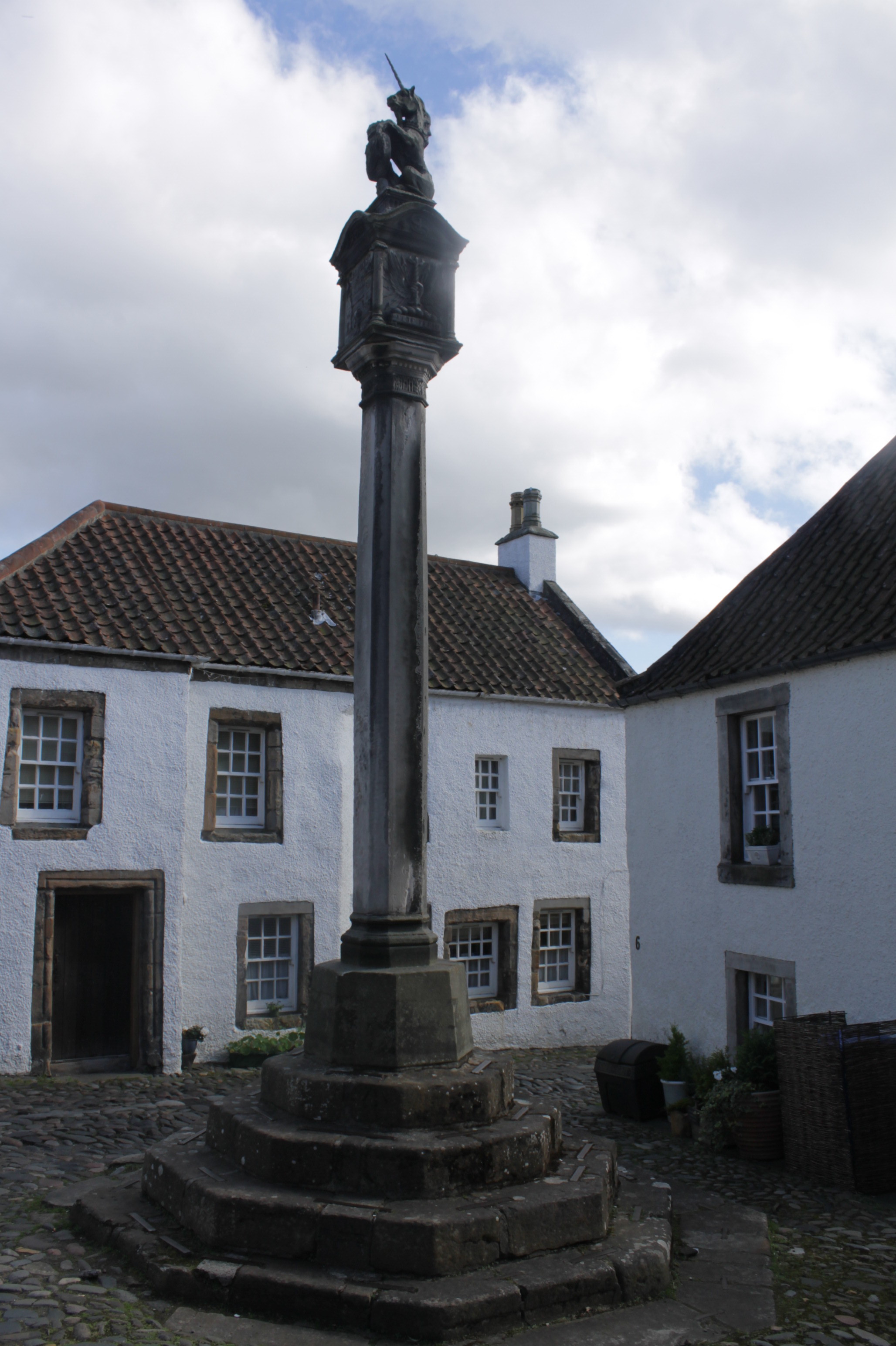
Mercat Cross, Culross

Several motion pictures have used Culross as a filming location, including Kidnapped (1971), The Little Vampire (2000), A Dying Breed (2007), The 39 Steps (2008), and Captain America: The First Avenger (2011).

In September 2013, the Starz television series Outlander started filming in Culross for its premiere in August 2014.

== Notable people ==
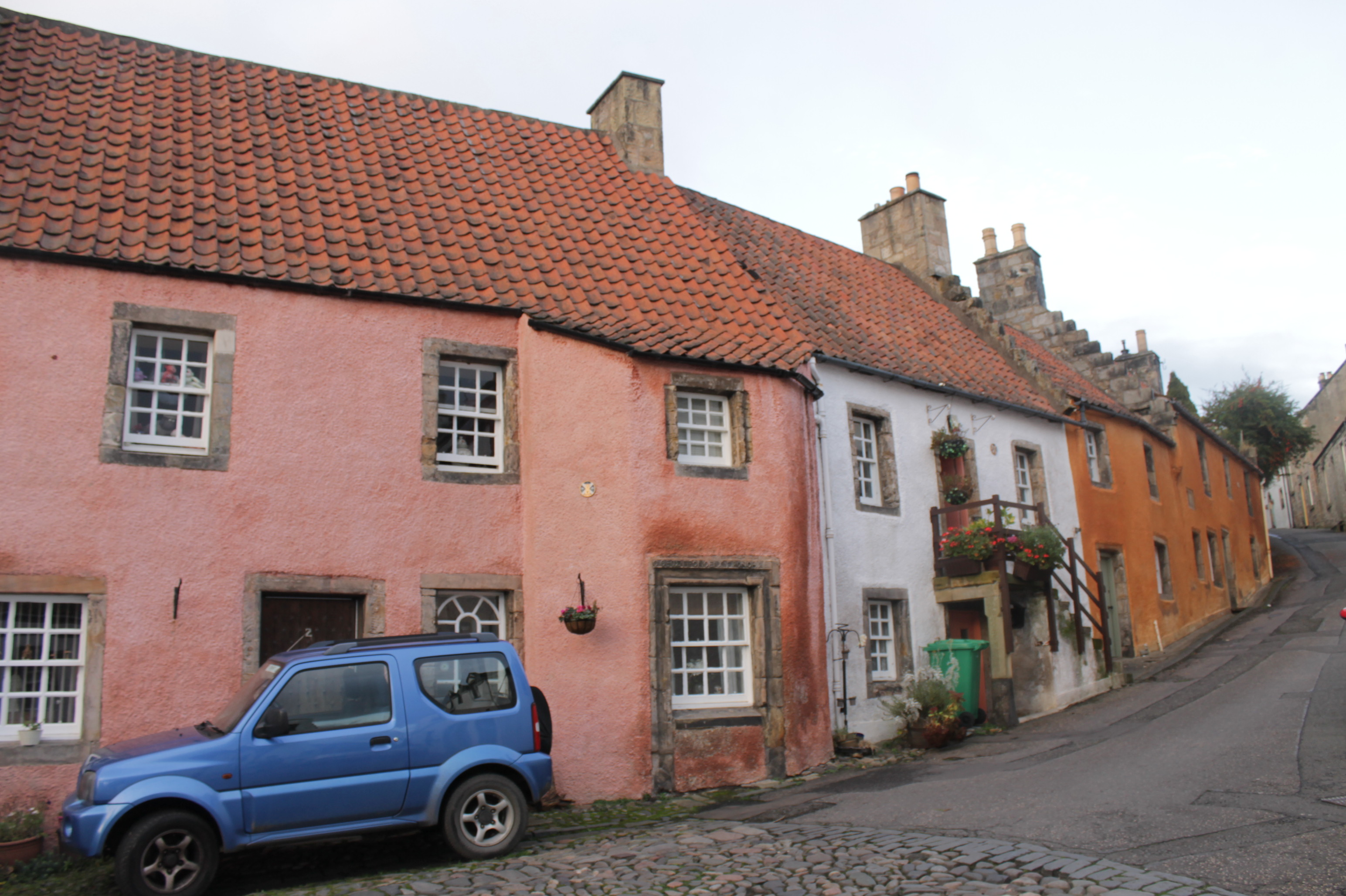
Tanhouse Brae, Culross

- George Bruce of Carnock (1550–1625), Lord Bruce
- Christian Cavendish, Countess of Devonshire, (1595–1675), daughter of Edward Bruce, 1st Lord Kinloss (1548–1611), owner of Culross Abbey House
- Thomas Cochrane (1775–1860), naval officer, mercenary and politician, spent much of his early life in Culross, where his family had an estate.
- Bishop Leighton, Archbishop of Glasgow
- Elizabeth Melville, "Lady Culross" (c.1578–c.1640), Scotland's earliest-known published female poet
- Stewart McPherson (1822–1892), recipient of the Victoria Cross
- Revd. Robert Pont (1525–1606) radical church figure during the Reformation, five times Moderator of the Church of Scotland
- Gilbert Primrose (d. 1616) surgeon to James VI
- Jackie Sinclair (1943–2010), Scottish international footballer
- Saint Mungo (518 AD – 614 AD), Born.

== Twin towns and sister cities ==
Culross is twinned with Dutch town of Veere, which was formerly the port through which its export goods entered the Low Countries.
