= Lilias Adie =

Scottish woman accused of witchcraft (c. 1640 – 1704)

- 3D virtual sculpture of Lilias Adie's face reconstructed by forensic artists at the University of Dundee
- Born: c. 1640
- Died: 1704 (age 60+); Torryburn, Fife, Scotland
- Body discovered: Torryburn Bay
- Known for: Only person accused of witchcraft in Scotland with a known grave

Lilias Adie (c. 1640 – 1704) was a Scottish woman who lived in the coastal village of Torryburn, Fife, Scotland. She was accused of practising witchcraft and fornicating with the devil but died in prison before sentence could be passed. Her intertidal grave is the only known one in Scotland of an accused witch – most were burned.

== Biography ==
Lilias Adie's first name also appears as Lilly, and her last name was also recorded as Addie and Eddie. In 1704, Adie was held in prison for the crime of practising witchcraft. Her story is preserved in the 1704 Kirk session minutes.

Illness among local residents created a brief but intense period of witch-hunting in the Fife area. A woman named Jean Bizet had accused Adie of witchcraft, proclaiming "beware lest Lilias Adie come upon you and your child." This resulted in the arrest of Adie, who was likely upwards of 60 at the time.

Adie was taken to the local minister, Rev. Allan Logan to answer to the crime of witchcraft. For over a month she was imprisoned and subjected to day after day of rough interrogation before she finally 'confessed'.

== 'Confession' ==
Adie's 'confession' explained how the devil had been wearing a hat when he first visited her in a cornfield at sunset the first time they met. Under the minister's questioning, she described how the devil had lain with her carnally and made her renounce her baptism. She detailed his physical appearance as having "cold pale skin and cloven-hoofed feet like a cow".

After that first encounter, the devil would then meet her at her house "like a shadow". Adie elaborated that she had gone to other meetings and cavorted with the devil with other witches. Despite repeated questioning Adie would not provide the names of these other witches. Lilias Adie died before her investigation was concluded.

== Burial site ==
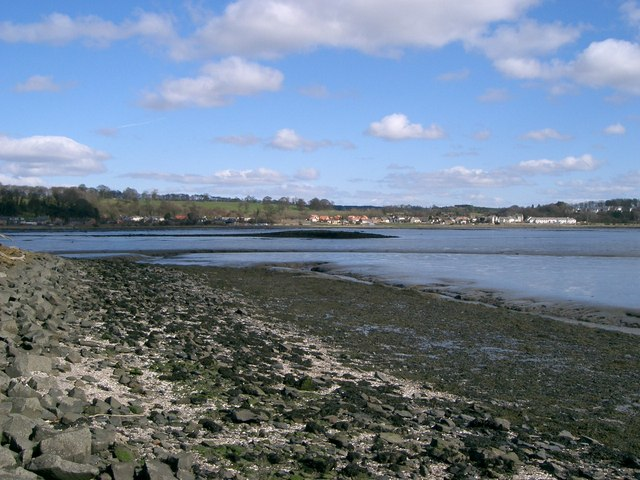
Torryburn Bay

In 2014, interest in Adie's story encouraged the historian and BBC broadcaster Dr. Louise Yeoman and Douglas Speirs, an archaeologist at Fife Council, to look for her burial site. Using 19th-century historical documents, they found a seaweed-covered slab of stone exactly where the documents described: in a group of rocks near the Torryburn railway bridge lay "the great stone doorstep that lies over the rifled grave of Lilly Eadie", and a rock with "the remains of an iron ring".

Lilias Adie had been buried on the beach at Torryburn Bay, in a "humble" wooden box, under this sandstone slab between the low and high tide marks. The "hulking half-ton" stone was indicative of locals' fears that the devil might reanimate her to "torment the living".

== Missing remains ==
Her remains were dug up by antique-collecting grave robbers in 1852. At the time, it was reported that the coffin was 6 feet 6 inches (about 1.98 m) long. Her thighbones were found to be of comparable length with those of a man who was 6 feet (about 1.8 m) tall. She still had most of her teeth, which were "white and fresh". The skull was in the private museum of Dunfermline antiquarian, Joseph Neil Paton in 1875. It was exhibited to the Fifeshire Medical Association in 1884 by a medical doctor from Dunfermline named Dow. It was eventually held at the Museum of the University of St Andrews, but has since disappeared. The skull was exhibited in 1938 at the Empire Exhibition at Bellahouston Park in Glasgow, its last known location.

Adie's coffin was also a source of souvenirs: a walking stick, believed to be made from the wood of her coffin and with a silver band near the handle engraved with "Lilias Addie, 1704", was donated to the Pittencrieff House Museum in Dunfermline in 1927.

== Digital reconstruction of her face ==
In 1904, two hundred years after her death, photographs were taken of Adie's remains which are now held at the National Library of Scotland.

Using these photographs, in 2017 Dr Christopher Rynn and a team of forensic artists at the Centre for Anatomy and Human Identification (CAHID) at the University of Dundee constructed a 3D virtual model and created a digital image of what Adie's face might have looked like.

== Legacy ==
Louise Yeoman said of Lilias Adie:

I think she was a very clever and inventive person. The point of the interrogation and its cruelties was to get names. Lilias said that she couldn't give the names of other women at the witches' gatherings as they were masked like gentlewomen. She only gave names which were already known and kept up coming up with good reasons for not identifying other women for this horrendous treatment – despite the fact it would probably mean there was no let-up for her. It's sad to think her neighbours expected some terrifying monster when she was actually an innocent person who'd suffered terribly. The only thing that's monstrous here is the miscarriage of justice.

Fife Council has launched a campaign to find out what happened to Adie's remains and give them a proper burial. Speirs stated "It's time to move the narrative away from the Halloween-style figure of the fun witch, and recognise the historic gender bias and suffering that women were exposed to in the name of witch-hunting." Wooden walking sticks constructed from the pieces of the coffin have since been recovered following the campaign launch with Andrew Carnegie a notable recipient given one such walking stick. Councillor Julie Ford, leading the campaign, said:

It's important to recognise that Lilias Adie and the thousands of other men and women accused of witchcraft in early modern Scotland were not the evil people history has portrayed them to be. They were the innocent victims of unenlightened times. It's time we recognised the injustice served upon them. I hope by raising the profile of Lilias we can find her missing remains and give them the dignified rest they deserve.

On 31 August 2019, 315 years after Adie died in custody, a memorial service was held in Torryburn and a wreath laid at the site of her grave to raise awareness of the persecution these women and men endured in Fife during the witchcraft panics.

Plans have also been mooted for a permanent memorial at Torryburn, dedicated to Lilias and other women who were persecuted across Scotland.

== See also ==
- Margaret Aitken
