= Scottish trade in the early modern era =

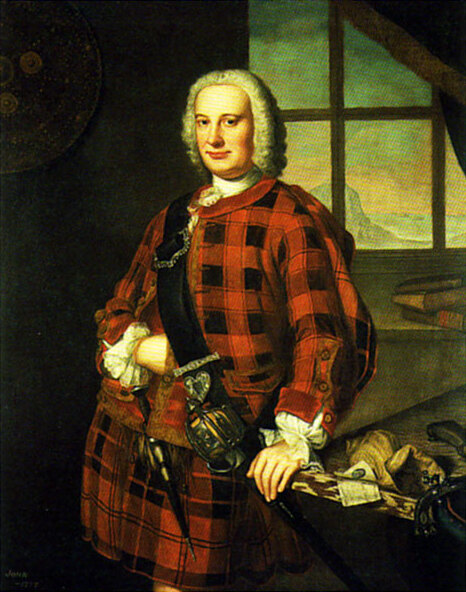
John Campbell of the Bank, cashier of the Royal Bank of Scotland, c. 1749. A banknote can be seen on the table.

Scottish trade in the early modern era includes all forms of economic exchange within Scotland and between the country and locations outwith its boundaries, between the early sixteenth century and the mid-eighteenth. The period roughly corresponds to the early modern era, beginning with the Renaissance and Reformation and ending with the last Jacobite risings and the beginnings of the Industrial Revolution.

At the beginning of this period Scotland was a relatively poor country, with difficult terrain and limited transport. There was little trade between different areas of the country and most settlements depended on what was produced locally. International trade followed the format of the Middle Ages, exporting raw materials and importing luxury goods and scarce raw materials. The early sixteenth century saw economic expansion from a low base before the English invasions of the 1540s. The late sixteenth century saw economic distress, inflation and famine, but also greater stability and the beginnings of industrial production as new techniques were imported to the country. The early seventeenth century saw economic expansion until the end of the 1630s, followed by disruption caused by the Bishop's Wars, English Civil Wars and English invasion and occupation.

After the Restoration there was a recovery of trade, particularly to England and with the Americas, despite the problems of tariffs. Attempts to establish a Scottish colony in Central America as part of the Darién scheme ended in disaster in the 1690s. After the Union with England in 1707 the cattle trade and coal production continued to expand and the major area of industrial production was linen. There was growing trade with the Americas, which produced the Tobacco Lords of Glasgow, the trade in sugar and rum from Greenock, while Paisley specialised in cloth. There was also the development of financial institutions, such as the Bank of Scotland, Royal Bank of Scotland and British Linen Company, and improvements in roads both of which would help facilitate the Industrial Revolution that would accelerate in the late eighteenth century.

== Background ==
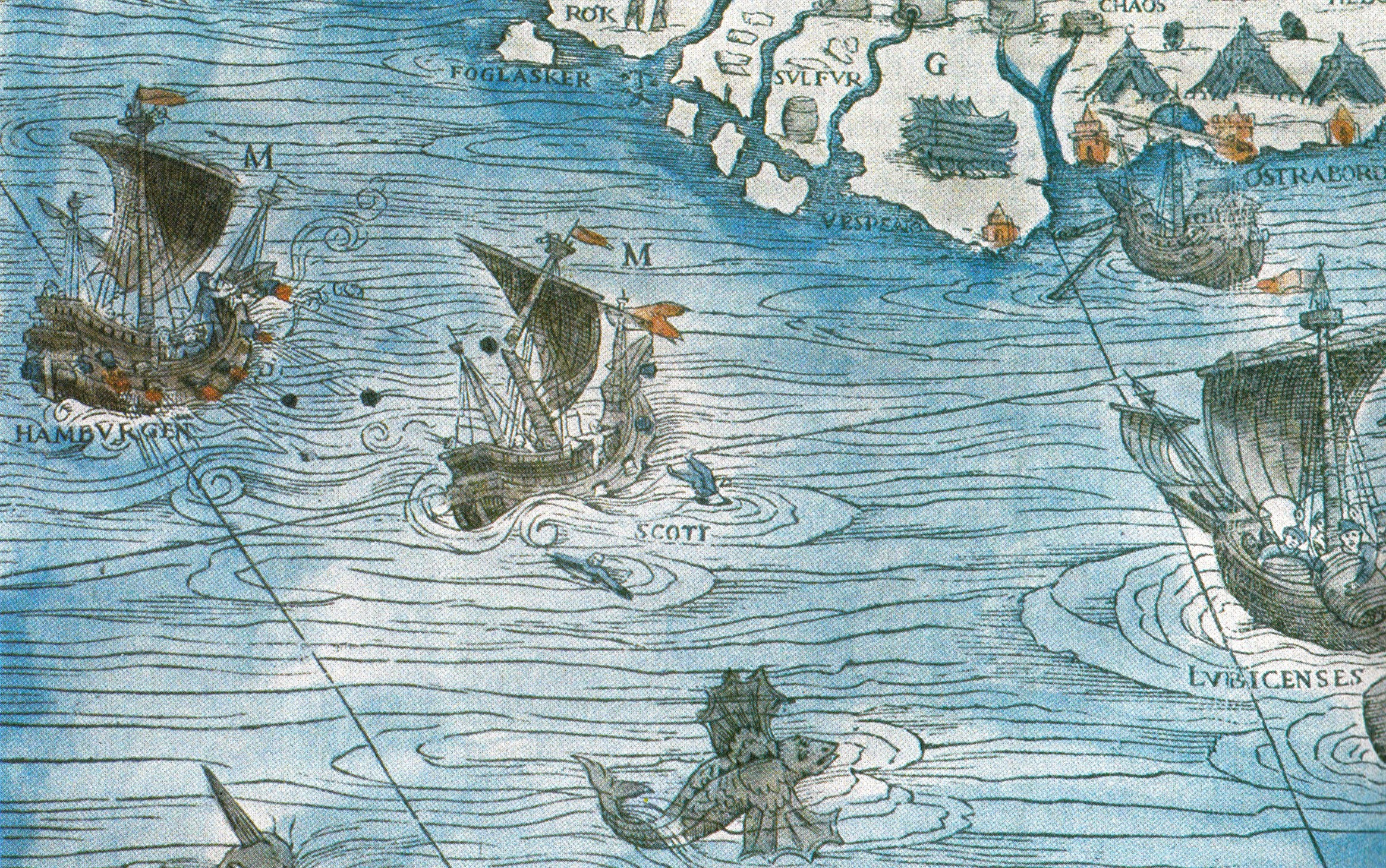
A Scottish armed merchantman is attacked by a Hanseatic ship. Detail from a sixteenth-century map.

Jenny Wormald commented that "to talk of Scotland as a poor country is a truism". At the beginning of the era, with difficult terrain, poor roads and limited methods of transport, there was little trade between different areas of the country and most settlements depended on what was produced locally, often with very little in reserve in bad years. Foreign trade was in the hands of a relatively small number of royal burghs, while generally smaller baronial and ecclesiastical burghs, that proliferated in the second half of the fifteenth century, acted mainly as local markets and centres of craftsmanship.

From the fourteenth century Scottish exports, and most imports, were channelled through a monopoly known as the Staple, which was located for most of the late Middle Ages in the Flemish town of Bruges. In 1508 James IV moved the Staple to the small port of Veere in the province of Zeeland, where it remained until the late seventeenth century. Most of the exports were raw materials, particularly wool, coal and fish. The major imports were luxury goods, such as cloth wine, pottery and military equipment, and scarce raw materials such as wood and iron. Major trading partners outside the Netherlands included France, Scandinavia and England. England was only the fourth most important trading partner, ranking just above the Hanseatic and Baltic ports and receiving mainly salt and coal.

== Sixteenth century ==
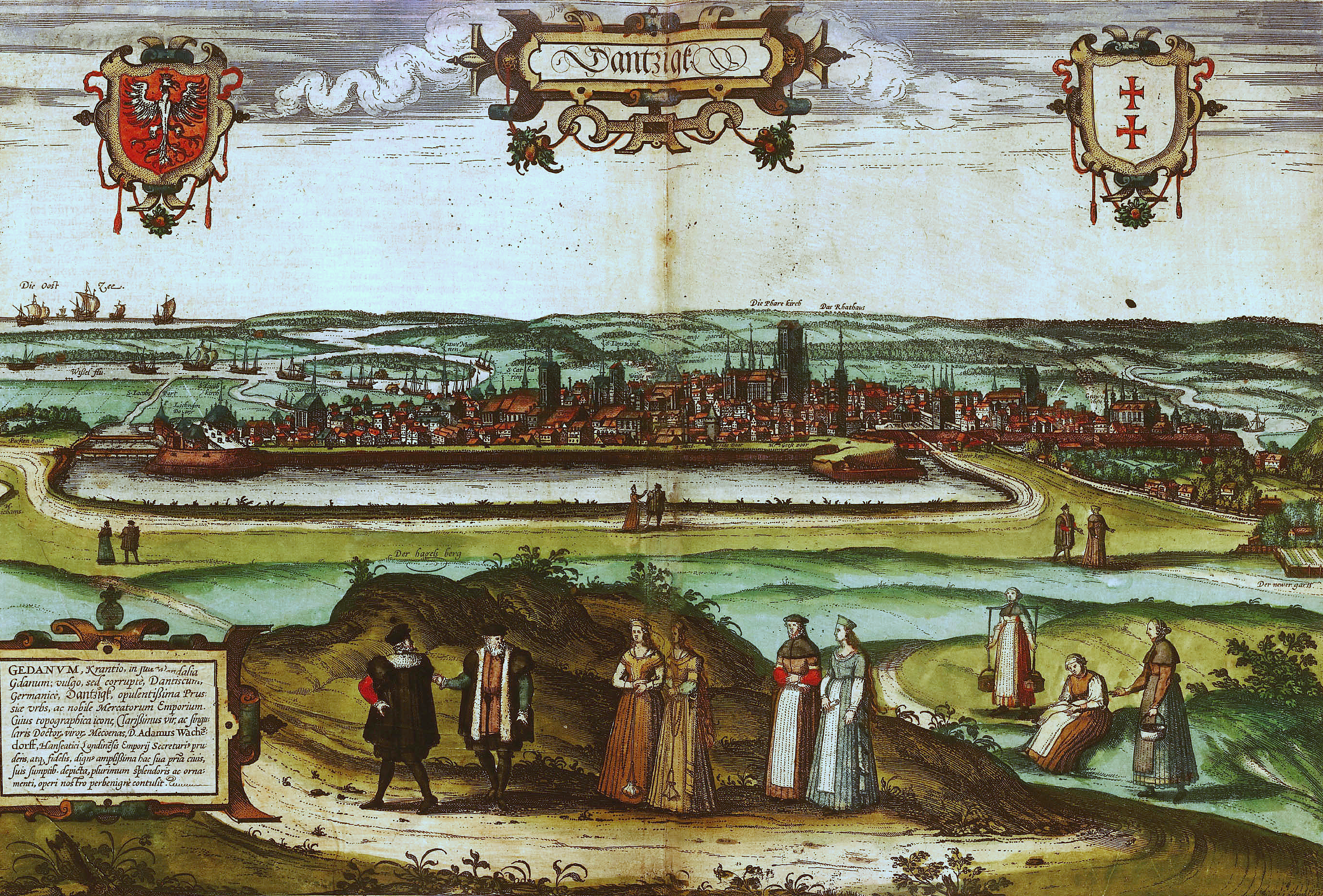
A view of Danzig in 1575, vital to Scottish grain supply and the site of a colony of Scottish merchants

From a low base at the beginning of the sixteenth century, trade expanded in the 1530s, but suffered from the English invasions of the Rough Wooing in the 1540s. From the mid-sixteenth century, Scotland experienced a decline in demand for exports of cloth and wool to the continent. Scots responded by selling larger quantities of traditional goods, increasing the output of salt, herring and coal. The late sixteenth century was an era of economic distress, probably exacerbated by increasing taxation and the devaluation of the currency. In 1582 a pound of silver produced 640 shillings, but in 1601 it was 960 and the exchange rate with England was £6 Scots to £1 sterling in 1565, but by 1601 it had fallen to a notional value of £12. Wages rose rapidly, by between four or five times between 1560 and the end of the century, but failed to keep pace with inflation. This situation was punctuated by frequent harvest failures, with almost half the years in the second half of the sixteenth century seeing local or national scarcity, necessitating the shipping of large quantities of grain from the Baltic, referred to as Scotland's "emergency granary". This was particularly from Poland through the port of Danzig, but later Königsberg and Riga, shipping Russian grain, and Swedish ports, would become significant. The trade was so important that Scottish colonies were established in these ports.

The fortunes of Scottish burghs in the export trade changed across the century. Haddington, which had been one of the major centres of trade in the late Medieval period, saw its share of foreign exports collapse in the sixteenth century. Aberdeen's share of trade remained stable for most of the century, but slumped in the last decade. The small Fife ports grew in significance and Edinburgh took an increasing share of trade through its port of Leith. In 1480 Edinburgh accounted for 54 per cent of export revenue and a century later it was 75 per cent. This forced smaller ports to diversify into other commodities and to undertake more coastal trading. Overall there was an increase in foreign trade from the 1570s, of which Edinburgh received the major share.

The reign of James VI (1567–1625) was most significant for its relative stability. Economic policy was limited by rudimentary understanding of economic matters and government efforts largely revolved around the creation of monopolies in the trade of various types of goods. There were the beginnings of industrial manufacture in this period, often utilising expertise from the continent, which included a failed attempt to use Flemings to teach new techniques in the developing cloth industry in the north-east, but more successfully in bringing a Venetian to help develop a native glass blowing industry. In 1596 the Society of Brewers was established in Edinburgh and the importing of English hops allowed the brewing of Scottish beer. George Bruce used German techniques to solve the drainage problems of his coal mine at Culross. Lead mining at Leadhills also expanded in this period, with most of the unsmelted ore sold for export.

== Early seventeenth century ==
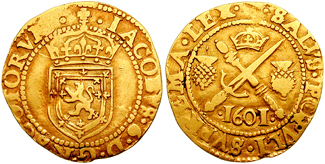
A 1601 coin of James VI, with a face value of three Scottish pounds. Due to devaluation, at issue it was worth about a quarter of one English pound

Attempts by James VI to make the dynastic union created by his inheritance of the English and Irish thrones in 1603, a political and economic union, floundered on mutual suspicion. The major benefit was in the pacification of the Borders, which brought to an end the widespread raiding and local warfare of the Border Reivers. Charles I's (r. 1625–49) attempts to bring the economies of England and Scotland closer to integration, including an attempt to produce a common fisheries scheme, were also unsuccessful. Generally the early seventeenth century was a time of increasing economic prosperity. Edinburgh obtained a virtual monopoly over international trade in key commodities, with the profits in the hands of a small group of "merchant princes". A number of them invested their wealth in new industries and businesses, such as coal mining, salt production and money lending. The prosperity tailed off in the 1630s and was brought to an end by the Bishop's Wars (1639–40) and Civil Wars (1642–51).

The English invasions of the 1640s had a profound impact on the Scottish economy, with the destruction of crops and the disruption of markets resulting in some of the most rapid price rises of the century. Under the Commonwealth, the country was relatively highly taxed, but gained access to English markets. At the Restoration in 1660, there was an end to high taxation and occupation and the formal frontier with England was re-established, along with its customs duties. There was a slow return to growth, but prosperity probably did not reach the heights of the 1630s. The currency remained one of the most debased and unreliable in Europe. No gold coins were issued by the Edinburgh mint after 1638 and with a balance of payments deficit that necessitated the export of large quantities of silver or bullion, the majority of coins in circulation between 1670 and 1707 were not in Scottish denominations. As a result, Scottish merchants had to perform multiple immediate multiple currency conversions and charitable bequests usually stipulated both an amount and a currency.

== Late seventeenth century ==
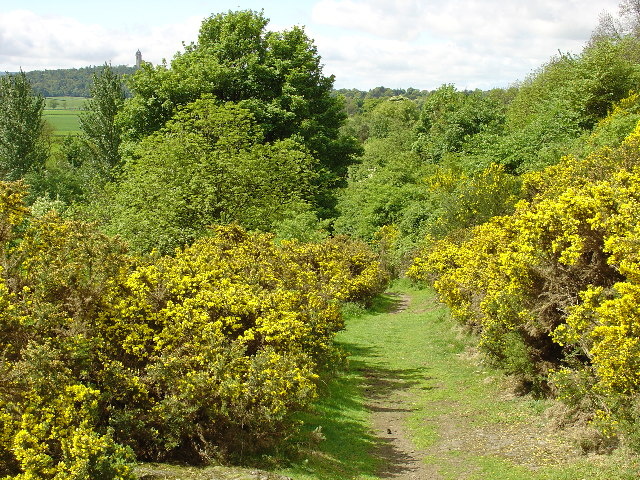
A section of drover's road at Cotkerse near Blairlogie, Scotland

In the late seventeenth century the monopoly of the Staple at Veere was increasingly disregarded, with specialist cargoes of coal and iron from the Forth ports bypassing it in favour of direct trade with the major ports of Amsterdam and Rotterdam. Imports began to include a wider group of luxury goods, such as beer, spices, wine, altarpieces, picture, iron, salt, soap and feather beds. The monopoly of royal burghs over foreign trade was partially ended by and Act of 1672, leaving them with the old luxuries of wines, silk, spices and dyes and opening up trade of increasingly significant salt, coal, corn and hides and imports from the Americas. The English Navigation Acts limited the ability of the Scots to engage in what would have been lucrative trading with England's growing colonies, but these were often circumvented. Glasgow became an increasingly important commercial centre, opening up trade with the American colonies: importing sugar from the West Indies and tobacco from Virginia and Maryland as well as deerskin (acquired through the Scottish Indian trade). Scottish exports across the Atlantic included linen, woolen goods, coal and grindstones. The English protective tariffs on salt and cattle were harder to disregard and probably placed greater limitations on the Scottish economy, despite attempts of the King to have them overturned. Scottish attempts to counter this with tariffs of their own were largely unsuccessful, as Scotland had relatively few vital exports to protect. Attempts by the Privy Council to build up luxury industries in cloth mills, soap works, sugar boiling houses, gunpowder and paper works, also proved largely unsuccessful. However, by the end of the century the drovers roads, stretching down from the Highlands through south-west Scotland to north-east England, had become firmly established. Black cattle bred in the Highlands were driven along these into northern England for sale. From there some were driven to Norfolk to be fattened before being slaughtered in Smithfield for the London population.

The closing decade of the seventeenth century saw the generally favourable economic conditions that had dominated since the Restoration come to an end. The Glorious Revolution in 1689 was a watershed in Scottish relations with its traditional trading partners in France as Scotland became embroiled in William II's wars with Louis XIV. There was a slump in trade with the Baltic and France from 1689–91, caused by French protectionism and changes in the Scottish cattle trade, followed by four years of failed harvests (1695, 1696 and 1698-89), known as the "seven ill years". The Parliament of Scotland of 1695 enacted proposals that might help the desperate economic situation, including setting up the Bank of Scotland. This was Scotland's first joint stock company, with limited liability for its shareholders and a monopoly of banking for 21 years, it opened for trade with a working capital of £10,000 sterling in early 1696. It operated on the exchanges in London and Amsterdam, made loans and issues banknotes. Aimed at supporting trade rather than government, it made loans to government agents on the same basis as commercial loans.

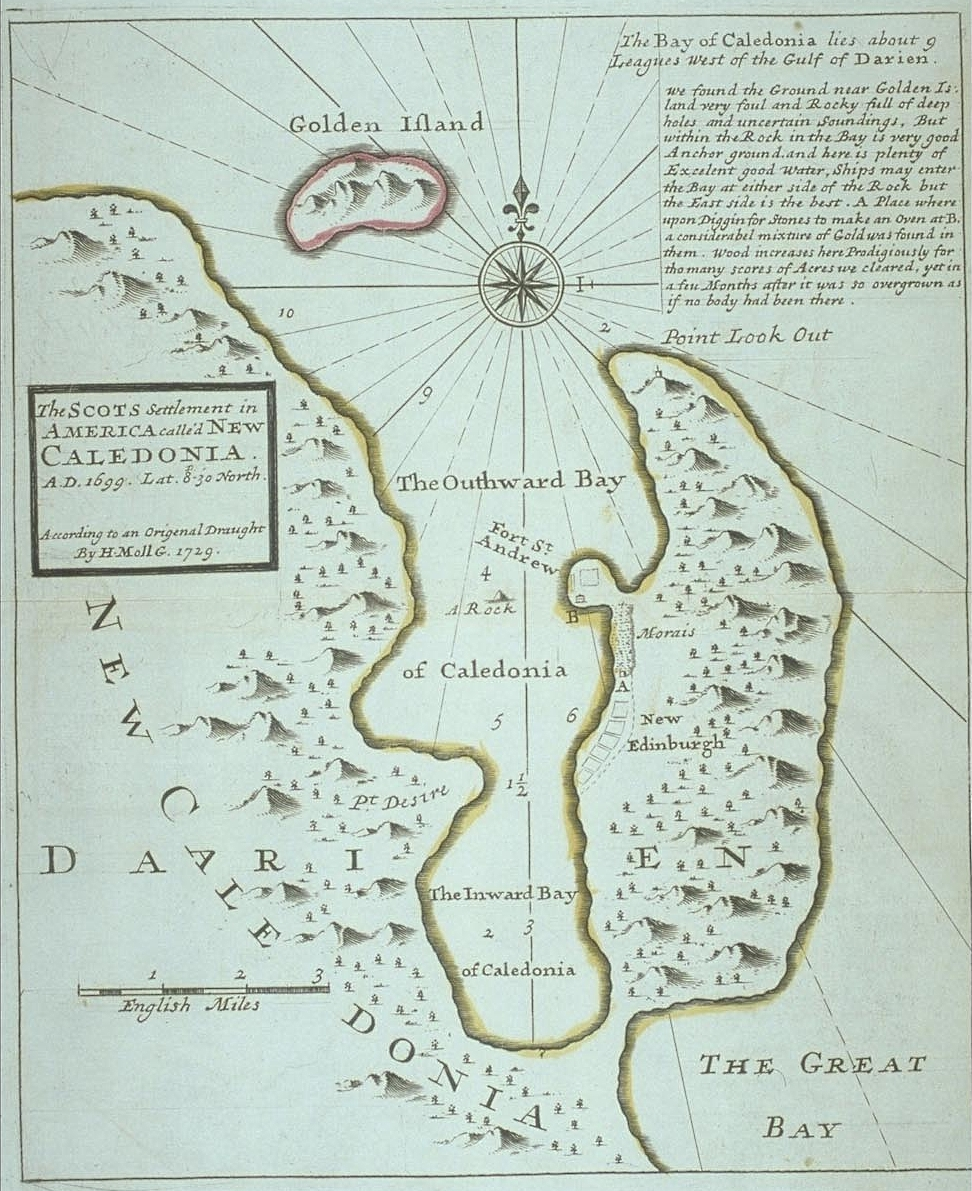
The colony of New Caledonia on the Isthmus of Darien

The Company of Scotland Trading to Africa and the Indies also received a charter to raise capital through public subscription. The Company of Scotland invested in the Darién scheme, an ambitious plan devised by William Paterson, the Scottish founder of the Bank of England, to build a colony on the Isthmus of Panama in the hope of establishing trade with the Far East. The Darién scheme won widespread support in Scotland as the landed gentry and the merchant class were in agreement in seeing overseas trade and colonialism as routes to upgrade Scotland's economy. Since the capital resources of the Edinburgh merchants and landholder elite were insufficient, the company appealed to middling social ranks, who responded with patriotic fervour to the call for money; the lower orders volunteered as colonists. However, both the English East India Company and the English government opposed the idea. The East India Company saw the venture as a potential commercial threat and the government were involved in the War of the Grand Alliance from 1689 to 1697 against France and did not want to offend Spain, which claimed the territory as part of New Granada and the English investors withdrew from the project. Returning to Edinburgh, the Company raised £400,000 in a few weeks. Three small fleets with a total of 3,000 men eventually set out for Panama in 1698. The exercise proved a disaster. Poorly equipped; beset by incessant rain; suffering from disease; under attack by the Spanish from nearby Cartagena; and refused aid by the English in the West Indies, the colonists abandoned their project in 1700. Only 1,000 survived and only one ship managed to return to Scotland. The cost of £150,000 put a severe strain on the Scottish commercial system and led to widespread anger against England, but also highlighted the problems of maintaining two economic policies, increasing pressure for full union. The resulting Acts of Union of 1707 that created the Kingdom of Great Britain were largely concerned with economic matters. Scotland gained access to English markets and colonies, concessions were give to a number of Scottish interest groups and there were generous cash payments to compensate for recent Scottish losses. It was full monetary union and the Bank of Scotland supervised the reminting of Scottish coins into sterling denominations.

== Early eighteenth century ==
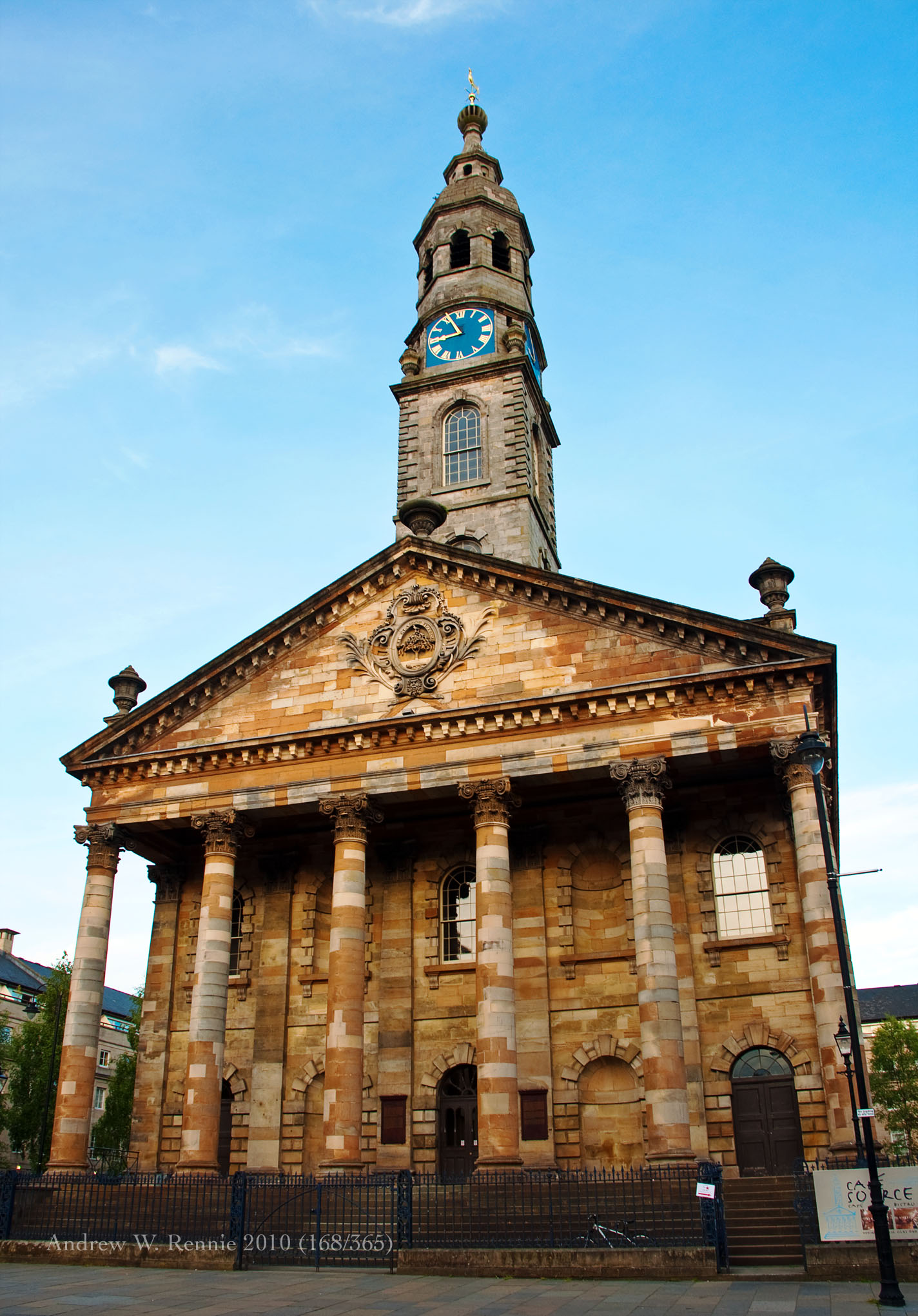
St Andrew's in the Square, Glasgow, built (1739–56) with money by the Tobacco Lords

In the early eighteenth century the cattle trade expand from around 30,000 head a year in 1700, to perhaps 80,000 by the middle of the century. Coal mining also continued to expand, rising from around 225,000 tons a year in the late seventeenth century to at least 700,000 tons by 1750. The major change in international trade was the rapid expansion of the Americas as a market. Glasgow supplied the colonies with cloth, iron farming implements and tools, glass and leather goods. Initially relying on hired ships, by 1736 it had 67 of its own, a third of which were trading with the New World. Glasgow emerged as the focus of the tobacco trade, re-exporting particularly to France. The merchants dealing in this lucrative business became the wealthy tobacco lords, who dominated the city for most of the century. Other burghs also benefited. Greenock enlarged its port in 1710 and sent its first ship to the Americas in 1719. It was soon playing a major part in importing sugar and rum.

In 1700 cloth manufacture was largely domestic. Rough plaids were produced, but the most important areas of manufacturing was linen, particularly in the Lowlands, with some commentators suggesting that Scottish flax was superior to Dutch. The Scottish members of parliament managed to see off an attempt to impose an export duty on linen and from 1727 it received subsidies of £2,750 a year for six years, resulting in a considerable expansion of the trade. These funds were derived from the Board of Trustees for Fisheries and Manufactures in Scotland, using money set aside at the Union. It distributed £6,000 a year to encourage industry, particularly the linen industry and fishing. Paisley adopted Dutch methods and became a major centre of production. Glasgow manufactured for the export trade, which doubled between 1725 and 1738. The trade was soon being managed by "manufacturers" who supplied flax to spinners, bought back the yarn which they then supplied to the weavers, bought the cloth they produced and resold that. Overall output trebled between 1728 and 1750. The move of the British Linen Company in 1746 into advancing cash credits also stimulated production.

In addition to the British Linen Company's move into finance there were other developments in banking in this period. The Bank of Scotland was suspected of Jacobite sympathies and so a rival Royal Bank of Scotland was founded in 1727. Local banks began to be established in burghs like Glasgow and Ayr. These included the Ship Bank in 1749 and the Arms Bank in 1750 in Glasgow. They would be joined by the Thistle Bank in 1761 and the Ayr Bank in 1769. They would make capital available for business and the improvement of roads and trade, which would help create the conditions for the Industrial Revolution that accelerated in the second half of the century.

== See also ==
- Economic history of Scotland
