= Upper Hirst =

Coal seam in Fife, Scotland

Coordinates: 56.122°N 3.775°W

The Upper Hirst is a coal seam in central Scotland that was mined on a large scale in the 1950s through to 2002, mainly to supply Kincardine Power Station, and later, Longannet Power Station, in Fife.

This was a low-quality coal, unsuitable for most other purposes, and had mostly been disregarded previously. Its low sulfur content made it very suitable for power station use. It burns relatively slowly making it popular in the 16th century for the manufacture of salt and glass. The seam is also known locally as the Jenny Pate or the Janet Peat.

The Upper Hirst coal is found within the Upper Limestone Group of strata, above the Limestone Coal Group, but below the Productive Coal Measures. The latter two groups of strata may be separated by up to 1,000 metres. In the Central Coal Field, which is in the form of a basin, the Productive Coal Measures, if they were ever deposited, have been lost by erosion except near the centre, where they outcrop near Alloa and Clackmannan, and have been mined until recently. The Limestone Coal Group of strata have been mined only around the edge of the basin, although in the 1950s there were plans for deep mines at Airth, where two large shafts were constructed to rockhead and then abandoned, and at Gartarry Toll, which was not begun.

At Manor Powis, for example, the useful seams in the Limestone Coal Group were at a depth of about 400 metres, and included valuable anthracite; the Upper Hirst was above this and as well as being mined at mid-shaft in the old colliery, was reached by a pair of sloping adits constructed near the bank of the River Forth. The slope of the seam was followed for some distance down the dip of the basin, to the east.

The Upper Hirst was initially mined experimentally at the site of Bannockburn colliery by a small drift mine, then at mid-shaft in Polmaise 3/4 (commonly called Fallin), Manor Powis, and later the drift mines at Dollar and Bogside, to supply Kincardine Power Station, but when Longannet Power Station was built, an innovative scheme was developed to mine the coal at Dollar, Castlehill and Solsgirth, and bring the coal from Solsgirth, Bogside and Castlehill to the surface by conveyor at Longannet, immediately adjacent to the power station. Bogside, on the eastern extremity of the basin, could access the coal at no great depth, and it was worked down the dip to the west, via a large, deep shaft at Castlehill, which was latterly used for personnel access, the coal all emerging at Longannet, except that from Dollar, which due to faulting could not be economically linked to the main conveyor system.

This scheme was a great success, although the focus of mining shifted to the south as the Dollar basin was exhausted. Eventually coal was being extracted from south of the River Forth, and there were adequate reserves to last for at least the predicted lifetime of Longannet Power Station. A disastrous flood on 23 March 2002 terminated production of the Upper Hirst coal, and brought deep mining in Scotland to an end.

The source of the flooding was allegedly the failure of a dam constructed to keep water which accumulated in the old workings to the north out of the working part of the mine, but there are substantial gaps in the known facts. A local mine manager claimed that the water, about 20 million gallons (a small amount in mining terms) could be pumped out for £55,000, which is probably much less than the redundancy payments to the approximately 200 staff when the company went into receivership in indecent haste. The investigation by HM Inspectorate of Mines is thorough and meticulous, but does not conceal the fact that nothing has been proved about what really happened underground.

Meanwhile, many tens of millions of tons of Upper Hirst coal remain inaccessible, the water level has reached the now closed adit entrance at Longannet, and the UK imported large quantities of foreign coal to burn in Longannet Power Station until its closure in 2016.

== History ==
One of the first large scale early workings of the Upper Hirst also ended in a flood. The Upper Hirst outcropped to the north, west and south east of Culross and was mined extensively by George Bruce (later Sir George Bruce of Carnock) and his sons between 1575 and 1676, using methods technically advanced for the time, such as a horse-powered bucket and chain drainage system. But the finest achievement was The Moat Pit at Culross, a shaft (actually three concentric stone towers to protect a central shaft from the ingress of the sea) constructed in the Firth of Forth on the foreshore 400m to the south of the high water mark at the west end of Culross. The primary purpose was to promote natural ventilation through the workings which extended under the Firth of Forth to the south. 19th century historians postulated that the circular tower was used for loading coal directly onto ships, but there is no archaeological evidence for this; most of the coal was used locally heating salt pans for distilling salt. On one occasion the mine was visited by King James VI of Scotland, who entered from the shore and emerged on the artificial island. But in a great storm on 30 March 1625, coinciding with high tide, the colliery, the first under sea mine in the world, was flooded. Sir George Bruce died later that year, and only some very limited working at the Moat Pit ever took place again. Instead his sons concentrated their mining to the east of Culross where around 20 further shafts were sunk including 3 more moated pits, St Mungo's and it is thought the Strandburn Pit and Valleyfield Moat Pit. Their activities ceased in 1676 with the exhaustion of easily accessible reserves.
