= Lavinia Malcolm =

Scottish local politician and women's suffrage supporter

- Lord Provost of Dollar in 1913
- Born: Lavinia Laing ca. 1847; Forres, Scotland
- Died: 2 November 1920 (aged 72–73); Dollar, Scotland
- Known for: first woman councillor in Scotland first woman Lord Provost in Scotland suffragist

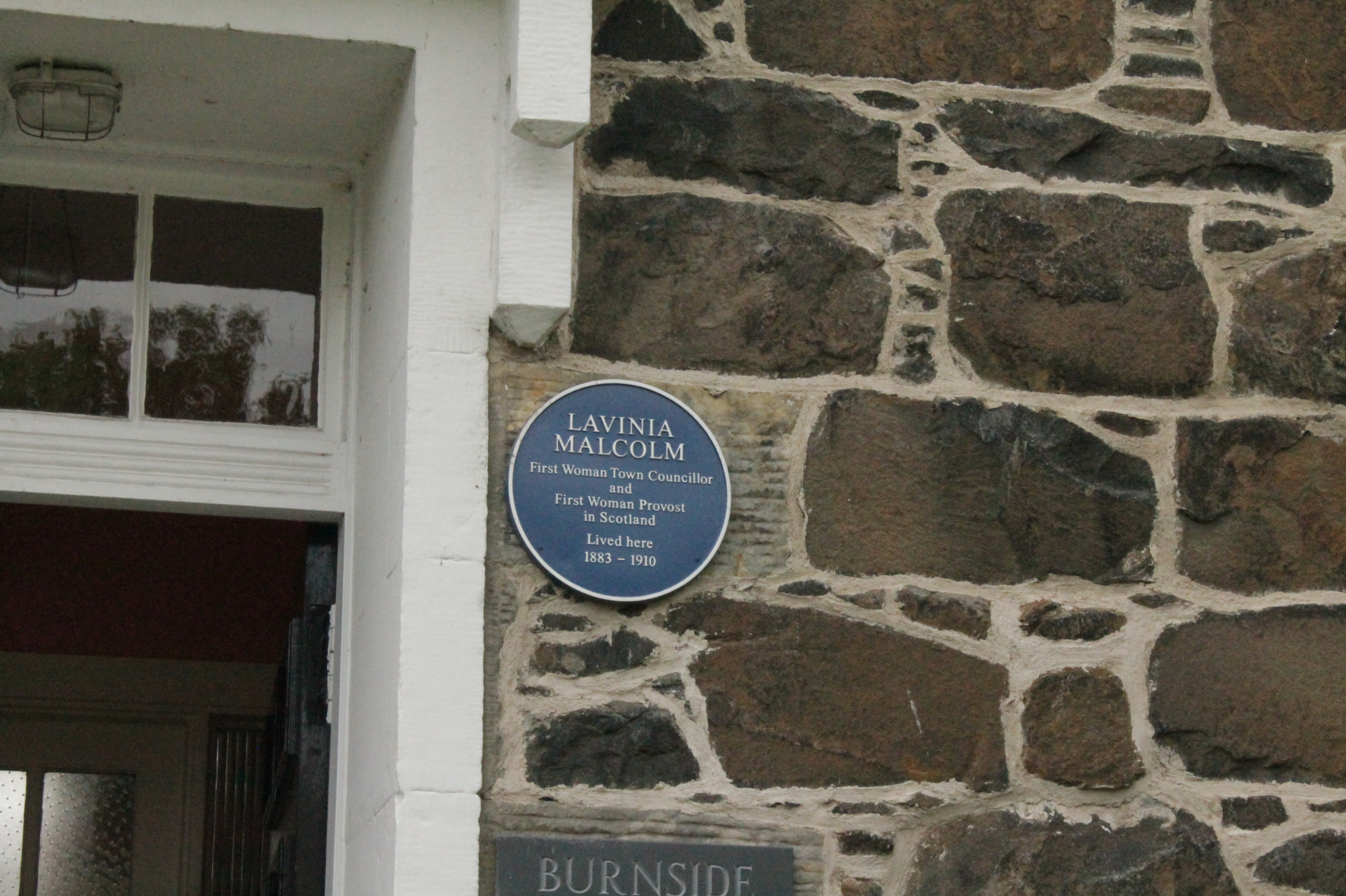
Plaque to Lavinia Malcolm, Burnside, Dollar

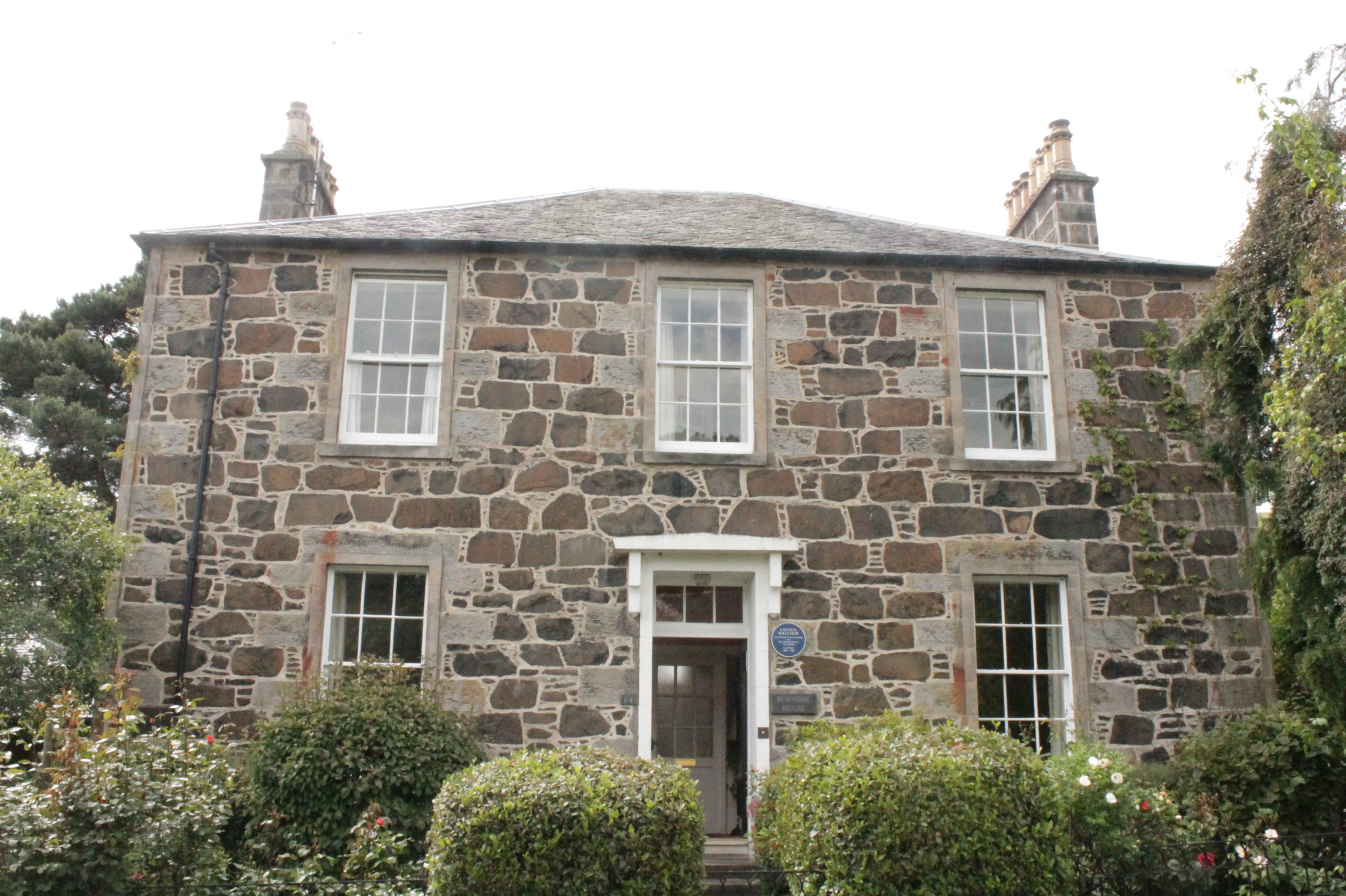
Lavinia Malcolm's home - Burnside House in Dollar

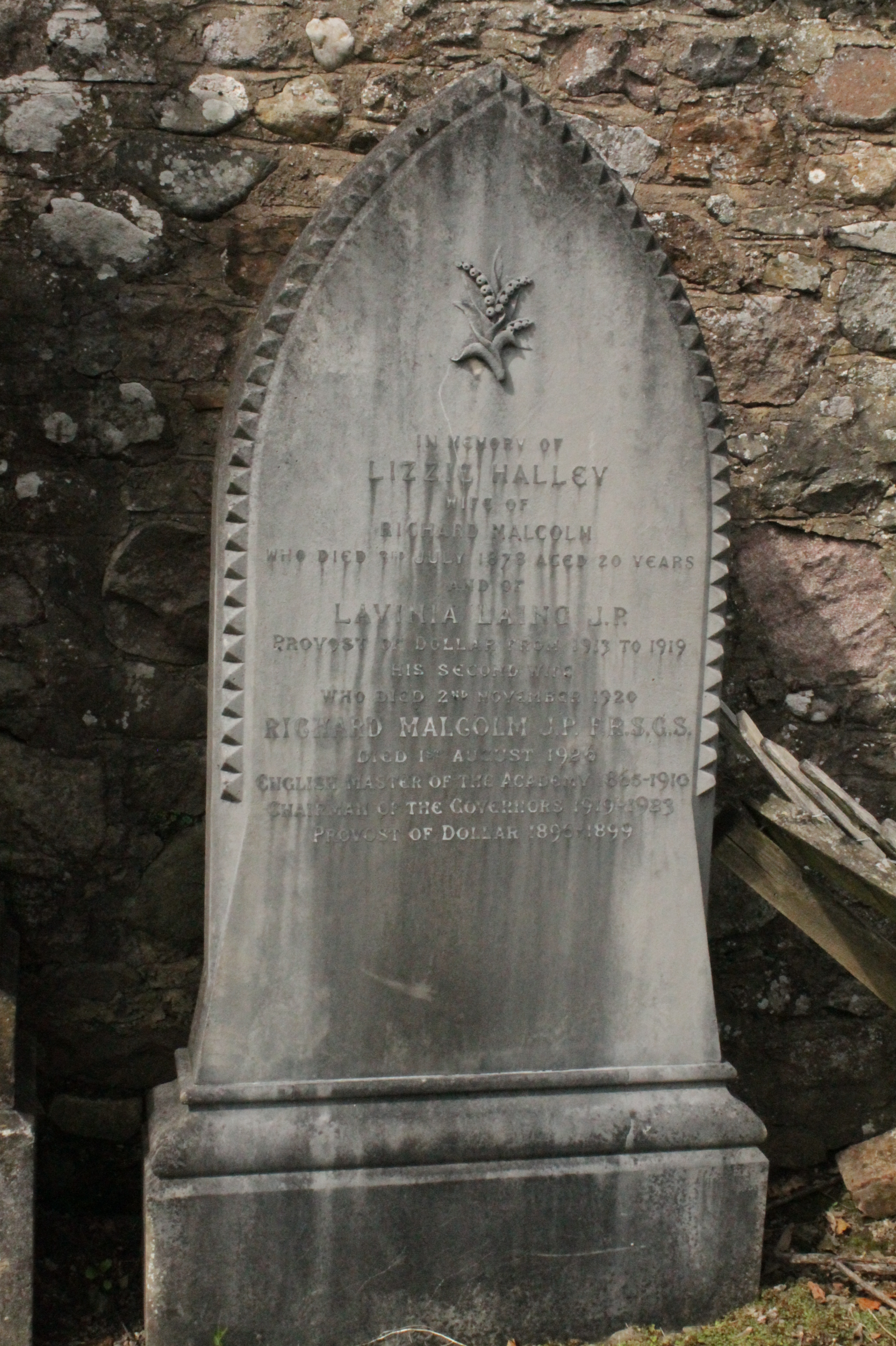
Lavinia Malcolm's grave in Dollar churchyard

Lavinia Malcolm nee Lavinia Laing (c. 1847 – 2 November 1920) was a Scottish suffragist and local Liberal politician, the first Scottish woman to be elected to a local council (1907) and one of the first women 'mayors' in the UK, as the first female Provost in Scotland in 1913: in the burgh of Dollar, Clackmannanshire.

== Early life and entry to politics ==
She was born Lavinia Laing in Forres, daughter of an ironmonger and councillor, and granddaughter of a former Provost of Forres and became a teacher in Edinburgh. She appears as a "teacher of drawing" living at 3 Elder Street in Edinburgh's First New Town in 1875.

Lavinia visited Dollar Institution (now Dollar Academy), and fell in love with one of its English teachers, Richard Malcolm FRSGS (1840–1926). Richard was still married to his first wife, Lizzie Halley, when they met. Lizzie died in 1878, which then permitted Lavinia to marry him.

She married him and moved to Dollar. They lived at Burnside House just north of Academy Place. The Malcolms hosted boarders from the school. Their child, Richard, died when he was eight-years-old, and both the Malcolms then entered local political life with Richard becoming Provost first (1896–9). Lavinia was the only woman elected to the council and returned unopposed, then later unanimously elected as provost by her fellow councillors in 1913.

Malcolm was also a member of both the local School Board and Parish Council. The Chairman of the former described her as "a most valuable assistant", and the Parish Council Chairman stated that "they could not get on very well without her"

== Supporter of women's rights ==
Malcolm is one of the first women to be elected lead their town council in the UK prior to 1914, after Elizabeth Garrett Anderson (Aldeburgh 1908), Sarah Lees (Oldham 1910), Gwenllian Morgan (Brecon 1910).

She is stated as the 'most famous' Provost on Dollar community website where her picture in full ceremonial robes appears.

"She wanted women to have the vote but she was against doing anything militant or violent," said Janet Carolan, the curator of the Dollar Museum who has spent 20 years researching Malcolm's background.

Throughout the First World War she served in the Provost role and was one of the first women to attend the national Convention of Scottish Burghs. She was one of the first women to be appointed as a Justice of the Peace.

She campaigned to reduce infant mortality and the underlying causes of poverty and poor sanitation.

She died in Dollar on 2 November 1920 and is buried in Dollar churchyard, close to her home. The grave lies on the north wall at the point where stones are enclosed for safety reasons.

== Leaving a legacy ==
During her life, Malcolm recognised her own place as a role model for other women.

Speaking in 2007, 100 years after Lavinia Malcolm's election, the then current Member of the Scottish Parliament (MSP) for Dollar the Scottish National Party's Keith Brown and the Scottish Labour Party's Sarah Boyack both recognised Lavinia Malcolm's example to women, noting

- 262 women councillors in Scotland, 20% of the total.
- 43 women MSPs, a third of the total.

Sarah Boyack, said she wants to see equal numbers of women and men in politics.

"There are plenty of women MSPs, there are women committee conveners, women cabinet ministers, but I would like to see more of a balance and particularly more women coming into local government to give a woman's perspective on things."

Ten years on the proportion of women represented in local and national government in Scotland has increased to 29% in councils and 35% in the Scottish Parliament (2017).

== See also ==
- Women's suffrage in the United Kingdom
