= Dollar, Clackmannanshire =

Town in Clackmannanshire, Scotland

Coordinates: 56°09′46″N 3°40′29″W

Dollar: Scottish Gaelic: Dolar
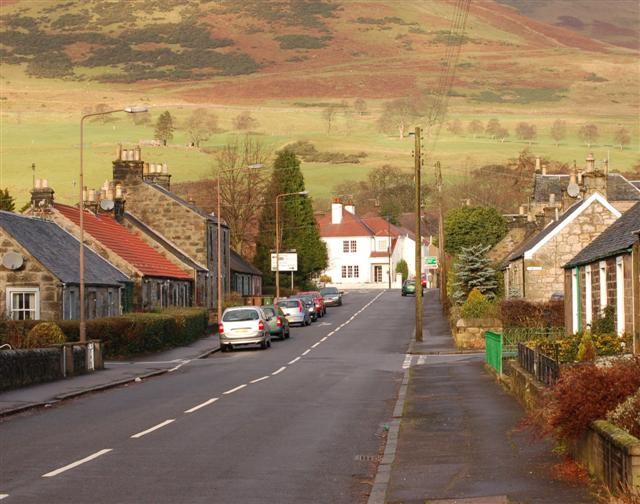

- Location within Clackmannanshire
- Population: 2,840 (2020)
- OS grid reference: NS964978
- Council area: Clackmannanshire
- Lieutenancy area: Clackmannanshire
- Country: Scotland
- Sovereign state: United Kingdom
- Post town: Dollar
- Postcode district: FK14
- Dialling code: 01259
- Police: Scotland
- Fire: Scottish
- Ambulance: Scottish
- UK Parliament: Dunfermline and Dollar
- Scottish Parliament: Clackmannanshire and Dunblane

Dollar (Scottish Gaelic: Dolar) is a small town in Clackmannanshire, Scotland, with an estimated population of 2,840 in 2020. It is 12 miles (19 kilometres) east of Stirling.

== Toponymy ==
The name is unrelated to the dollar currency name. The most likely derivation for the name is from Pictish dol + ar, 'haugh place' or 'place of the water-meadow' (cf Welsh dôl 'meadow'). The word dol was most likely borrowed from Pictish or North Brittonic into Scottish Gaelic as dail 'water-meadow' or 'haugh'. Another possible interpretation is that Dollar is derived from various alternate meanings of dol and ar in Pictish: Dol (field) + Ar (arable) or Dol (valley) + Ar (high).

== History ==
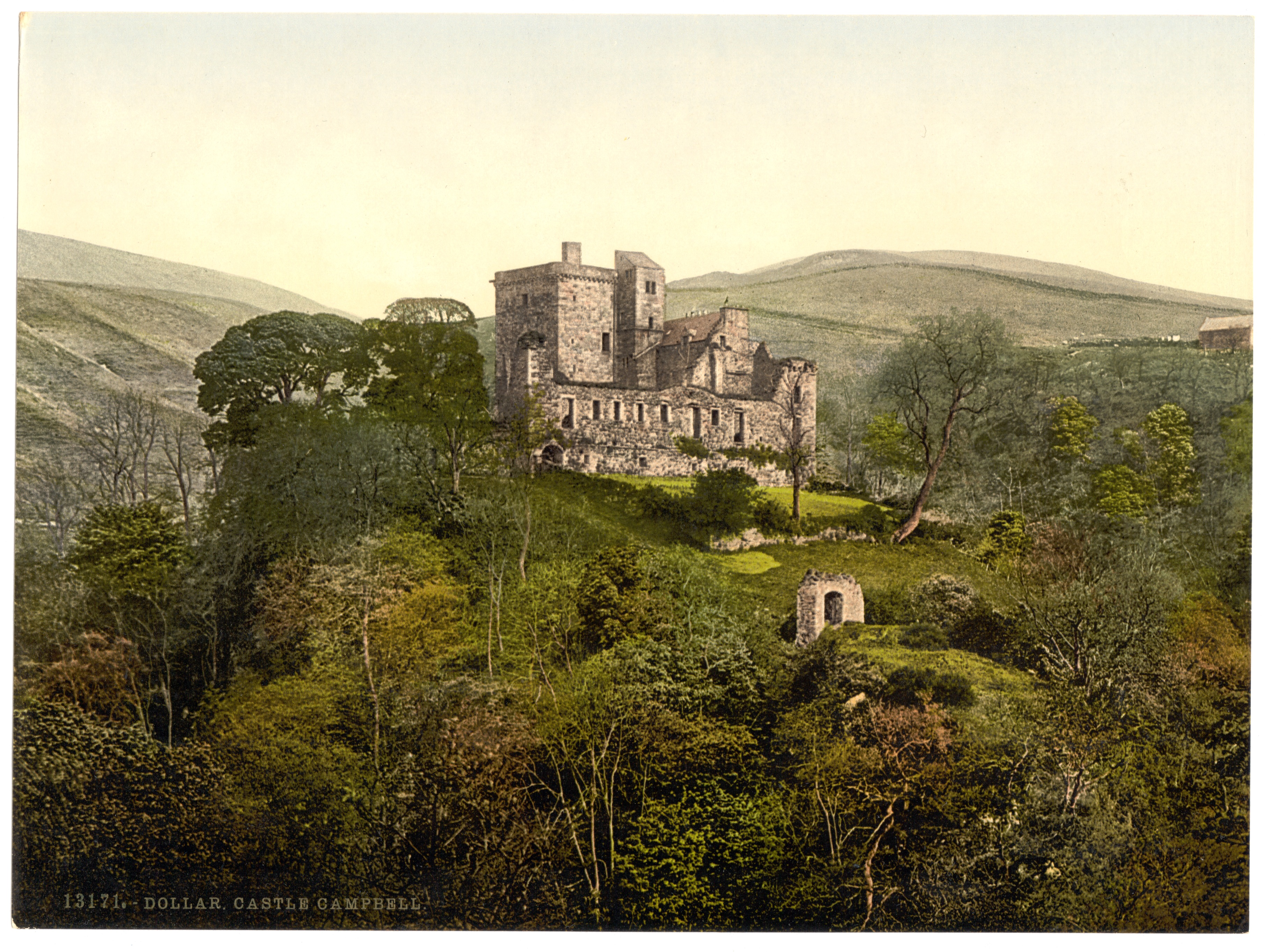
A photochrom of Castle Campbell, Dollar, Scotland

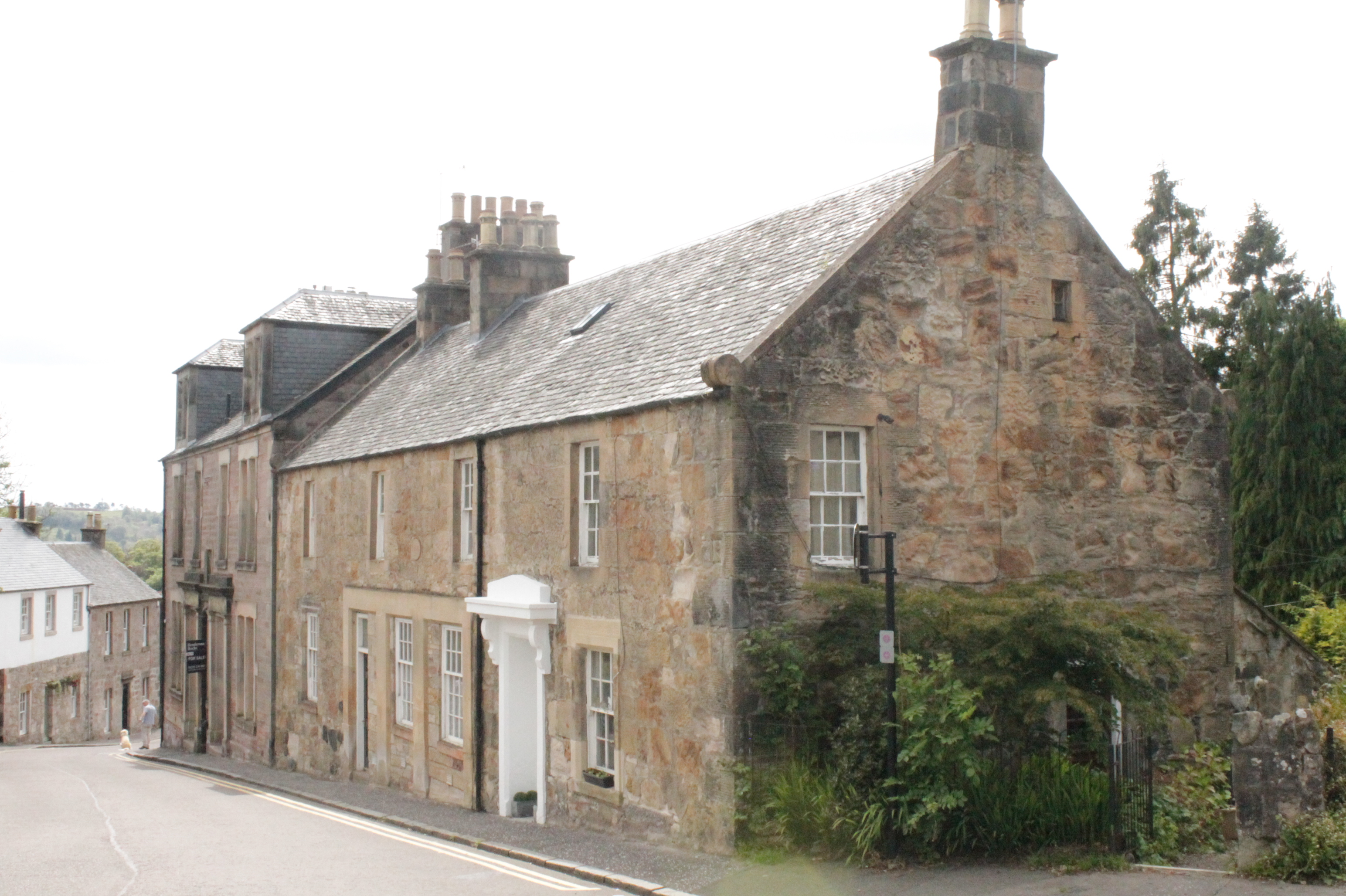
Old houses in Dollar

The 500-year-old Castle Campbell stands overlooking the town, sitting on a forward projection of rock on the south side of the Ochil Hills. The castle was the lowland seat of the Duke of Argyll, where Mary, Queen of Scots once stayed in the 16th century.

The original town (of which parts still survive) stands on the sloping ground beneath the castle, in what is now the northeast section of the town. Buildings here are generally stone built and two stories high. The oldest buildings date from the mid-17th century and several 18th-century buildings exist. Development spread to the west and south through the 19th century.

Around 1840 the construction of a new road to Muckhart on the lower ground south of the original route, created the current main east–west street. This quickly became the new "town centre" and the focus of shops and public activity.

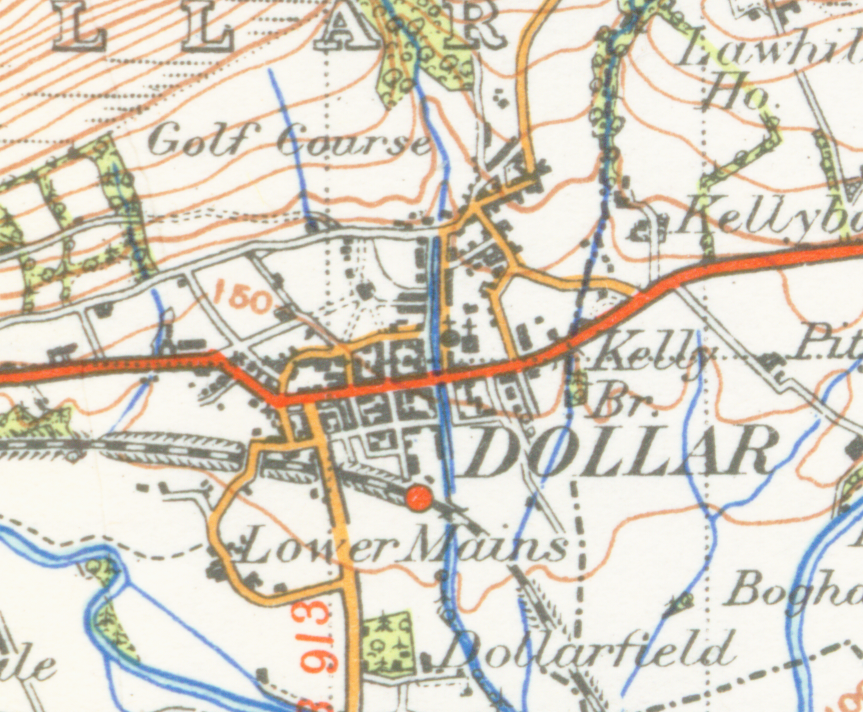
A map of Dollar from 1945

The town has two war memorials, one for each world war. In the grounds of Dollar Academy, a bronze figure with outstretched hands by George Henry Paulin faces westwards and commemorates the fallen of the First World War. This also has names added for Northern Ireland.

A small museum run by volunteers contains a collection of local items, and much information about the former Devon Valley Railway, which closed to passengers in 1964. The town is now largely a dormitory community for people who work in Stirling and further afield (e.g. Glasgow and Edinburgh).

== Location and transport ==
It is one of the Hillfoots Villages, situated between the Ochil Hills range to the north and the River Devon to the south. Dollar is 12 miles (19 kilometres) east of Stirling on the A91 road to St Andrews. The town had a station on the Devon Valley Railway linking Alloa and Kinross, which closed in 1964.

== Economy ==
Attempts were made to mine lead and copper in Dollar Glen from the 18th century and possibly earlier, but these were of no economic significance. Coal mining in the area began around the same time and, until 1973, supplied the Kincardine Power Station, and later, the Longannet Power Station with coal from the Upper Hirst seam. A tiny private non-NCB coal mine operated from the Harviestoun estate from the mid-1970s, partly filling the gap that the closed NCB left, whilst there was still local demand for coal.

In common with the other Hillfoots Villages, the textiles industry played an important part in the town's development. The Harviestoun Brewery was established west of Dollar in 1985, before its move to Alva.

== Governance ==
From 1891 to 1975 the town had its own council. It is now within Clackmannanshire council area. It forms part of the Clackmannanshire East ward which includes Clackmannan, Comely Bank, Dollar & Muckhart. In the 2017 local elections, residents of the ward elected three councillors—one each from the Scottish National Party, the Labour Party and the Conservative Party.

== Provosts ==
Dollar had a provost from 1891 to 1975. The provosts were:

- James Beveridge Henderson (1891–1893)
- David Westwood (1893–1896)
- Richard Malcolm (1896–1899)
- John Drysdale (1899–1902)
- M Fisher (1902–1908)
- James Benson Green (1908–1913) and (1919–1925)
- Lavinia Malcolm (1913–1919), wife of Richard Malcolm (above), the first and only female Provost
- Captain Stewart Fairweather Butchart (1925–1931)
- C Allsopp (1931–1937)
- R Waddell (1937–1939)
- J Scott (1939–1943)
- P Walton (1943–1946)
- Alexander McLean Cowan (1946–1950)
- J Crawford Shaw (1950–1953)
- J Hewitt (1953–1956)
- J Muckersie (1956–1962)
- J M Miller (1962–1965)
- H Moss (1965–1968)
- Dr William Young Galloway (1968–1971) the town GP
- E M M Breingan (1971–1975)

== Notable people ==
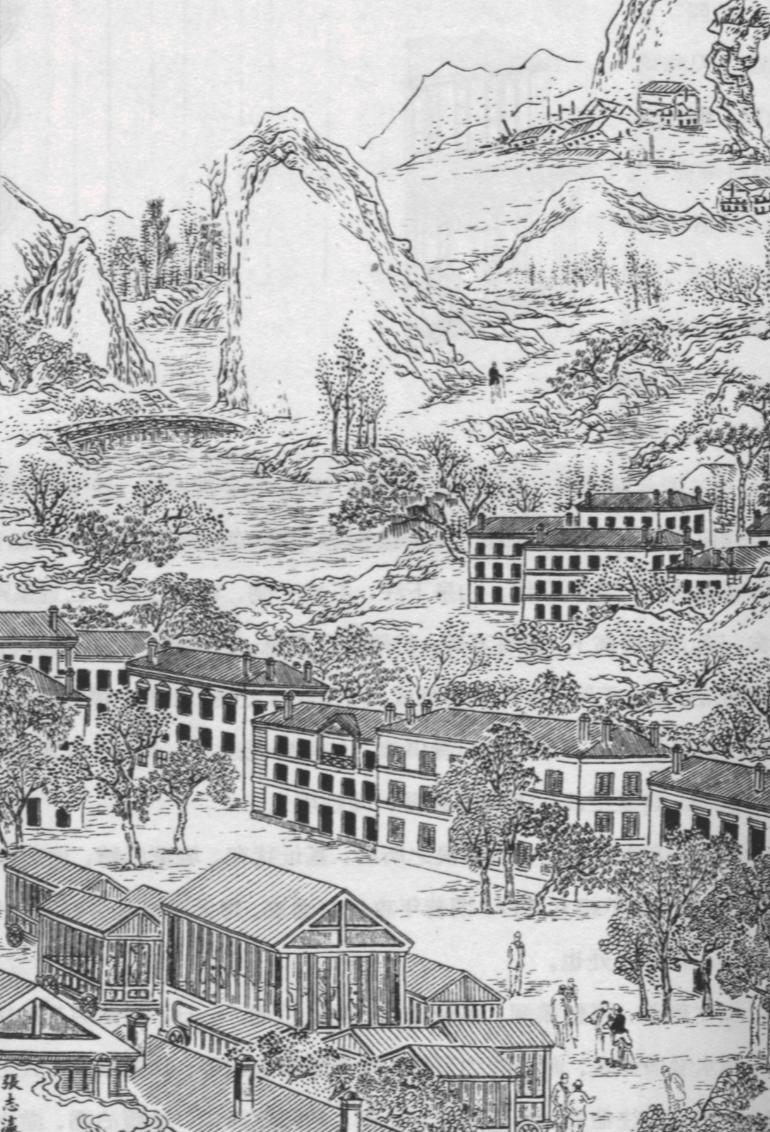
A sketch of the town in the 19th century by Wang Tao

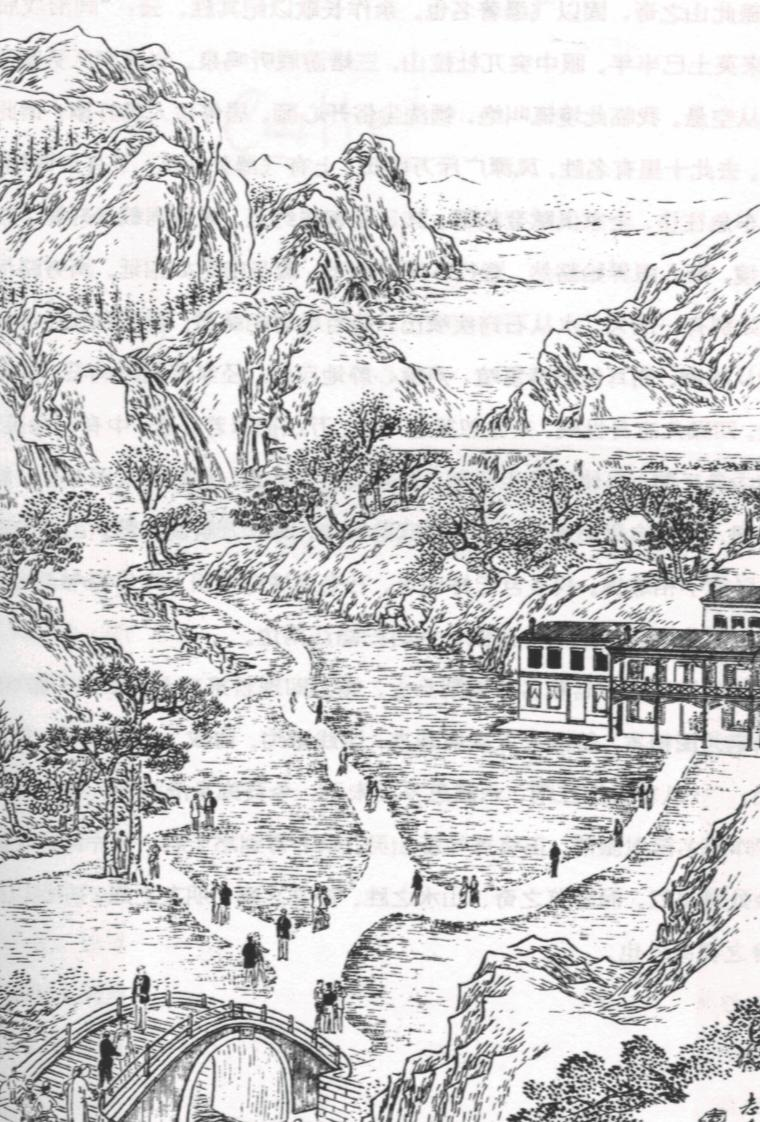
A sketch of the Mill Green in the 19th century by Wang Tao

- William Auld (1924–2006) poet and Esperanto author, nominated three times for the Nobel Prize in Literature, lived in Dollar until his death
- Constantine I, the King of the Picts in 875 fought against a Danish army at the Battle of Dollar.
- Thomas Forret, Protestant cleric, burned for heresy in 1539
- David Taylor (1817–1867) illegitimate poet in the Scots tongue, born in Dollar
- James Legge, Scottish sinologist
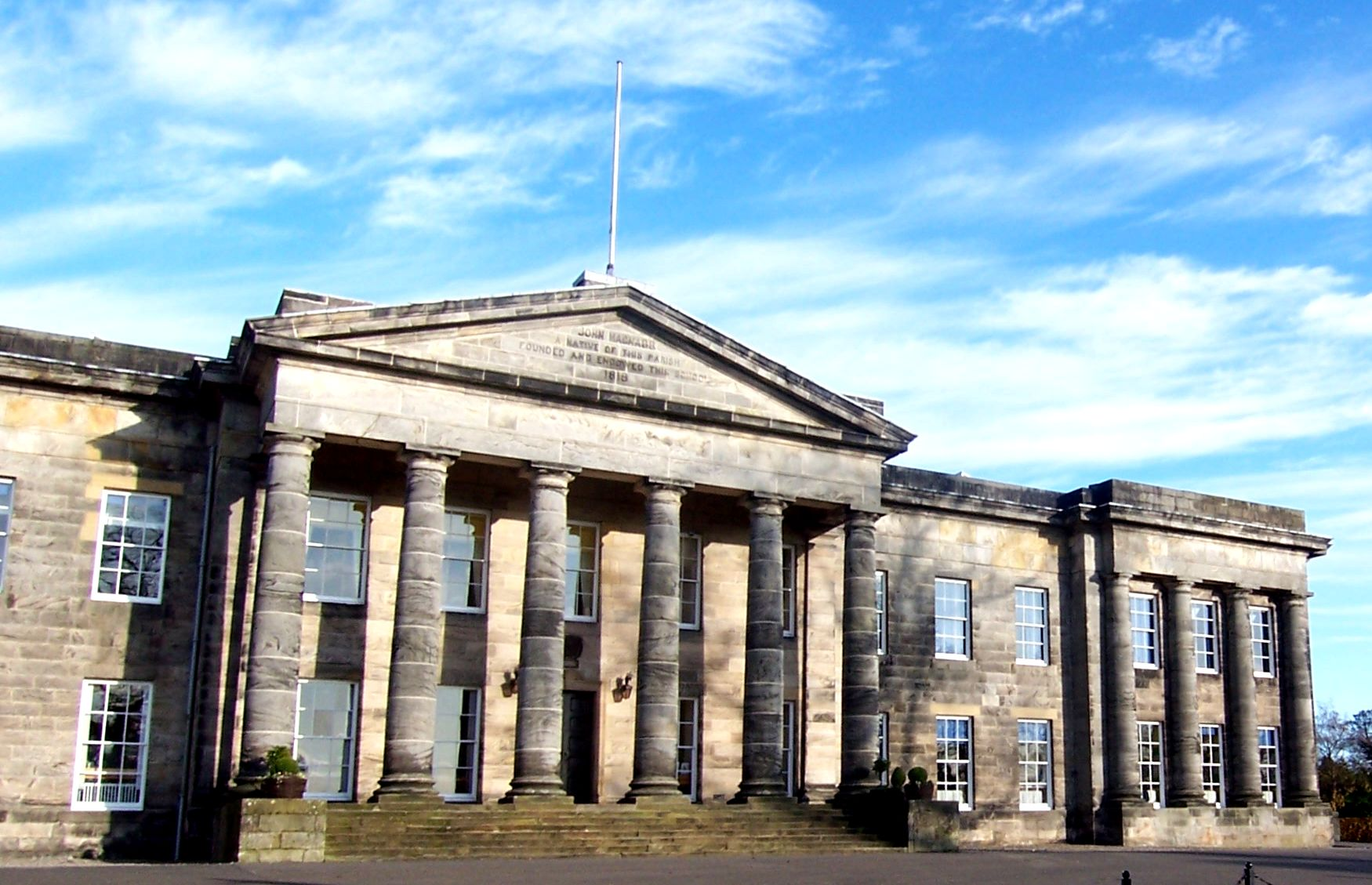
- Dollar Academy (Playfair building)
  Dollar Academy was founded in 1818 with a bequest from a Dollar native, Captain John McNabb, who had allegedly made his fortune in the slave trade. Amongst the many notable pupils at the academy are James Dewar, the inventor of the vacuum flask; the grandsons of Haile Selassie I of Ethiopia; the second Presiding Officer (Speaker) of the Scottish Parliament, George Reid; BBC Gaza correspondent Alan Johnston; and political journalist for The Scotsman, the News of the World and The Spectator magazines, Fraser Nelson.
- Lavinia Malcolm, Provost of Dollar between 1913 and 1919, was both the first lady provost and first female town councillor in Scotland.
- Alan Longmuir, of Bay City Rollers fame, lived just east of Dollar and owned and operated the Dollar Arms public house for a time.
- In the late 1990s, Michael Kulas and Saul Davies, musicians in the English rock group James, also resided and worked out of the old Tea House Cottage, now known as Brewlands, next to Castle Campbell.
- The Scottish author Iain Banks studied at the nearby University of Stirling and, in an interview for The South Bank Show in 1997, spoke about using the landscape above Dollar as inspiration for his novels (in particular A Song of Stone).
- The biologist Alan Grafen, born in Dollar
- Patrick Syme was an art master at Dollar Academy, and died in Dollar.
- Internationalist footballer Steven Caulker's eligibility to play for Scotland is from his grandmother Jessie hailing from Dollar.
- Rev James Aitken Wylie was minister of the Secessionist Church in Dollar from 1831 to 1843.
- Jazz pianist Fergus McCreadie grew up in Dollar.

== Sport ==
Dollar is home to the Dollar Glen Football Club, the Dollar Golf Club—a nine-hole golf course notable for its steep inclines and lack of bunkers (a decision made by Ben Sayers), a tennis club, a squash club, a bowling club, and a cricket club. The Ochil Hills that overlook Dollar provide opportunities for mountain biking.

== Religion ==
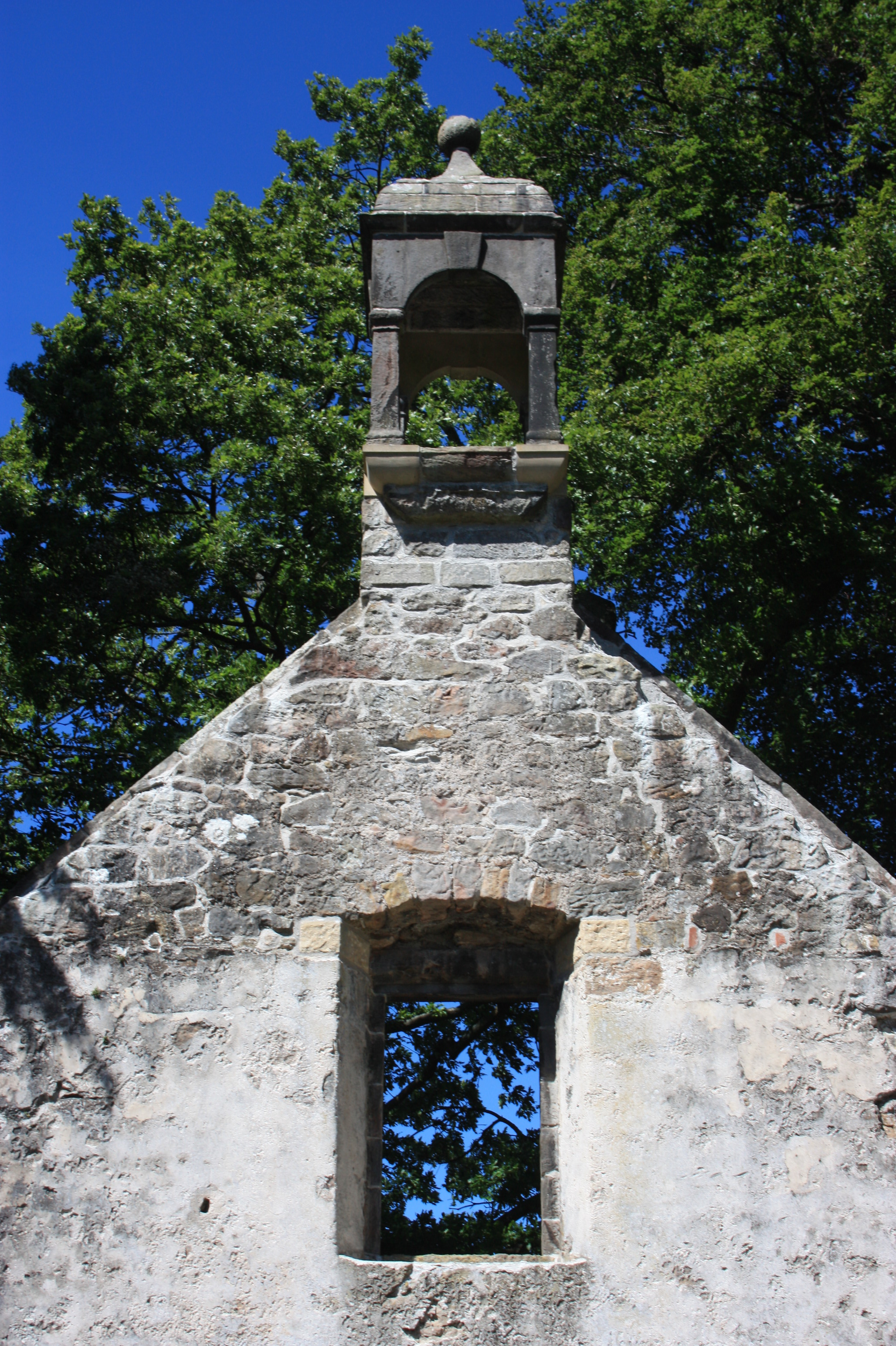
The ruins of Old Dollar Parish Church

There are three churches, one Church of Scotland, one Scottish Episcopal Church and Ochil Hills Community Church which meets in the Civic Centre.

== Twin towns ==
Dollar is twinned with the French town of La Ville-aux-Dames, which lies just outside Tours in the Loire Valley.
