= David Taylor (poet) =

Scottish poet (1817–1867)

David Taylor (1817–1867) was a 19th-century Scottish poet, musician and songwriter. His most well-known work (or rather the phrase derived from it) is "The Proof of the Pudding". Working in the Scottish dialect his work was clearly influenced by Robert Burns. Like Burns he wrote in the true Scottish language of Doric which was usually wrongly seen as a corrupted version of English, and despite being the spoken language of the majority was not accorded the respect that the minority language of Gaelic was afforded.

== Life and death ==
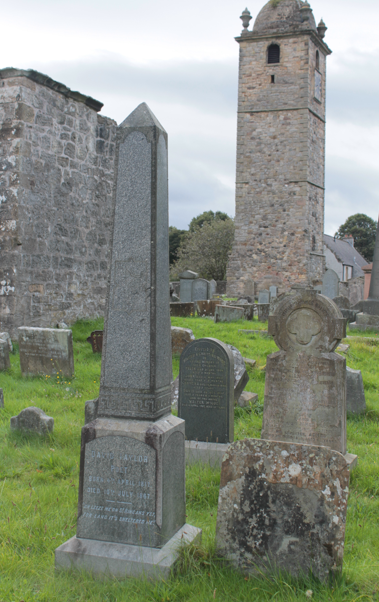
The grave of the poet David Taylor in St Ninian's churchyard

He was born on 4 April 1817 in Dollar, Clackmannanshire. His father David Taylor had been a builder in Auchtermuchty but had run off with Janet Eadie from nearby Cupar. They ran off to Dollar where they purported to be husband and wife. They were not, and this was revealed at the registration of David's birth. The couple then moved again to purport to be a young family. The family moved to St Ringan's in the town of St Ninian's, around 15 miles west, just south of Stirling. He had minimal education. He could read and write but started rhyming from an early age. Probably from around age 8 he began training as a handloom weaver (which was probably his father's trade). He tutored people in music in the evenings and ran a choir in the Charterhall district occasionally giving concerts in Stirling.

His compositions appeared in local newspapers: the Clackmannanshire Advertiser, the Stirling Observer and Stirling Journal and proved popular. When he later moved to Alloa his works appeared in the Alloa Advertiser.

Around 1855 he was taken to court in relation to his poem "The Wreck of the Countess". The steamship Countess was a ferry plying between Alloa harbour and South Alloa (near Falkirk) under command of Captain Meikle. On a summer's day it had foundered in the Forth Estuary. Taylor was taken to court by Captain Meikle for his "slanderous" poem but the judge dismissed the case as he recognised the freedom of poetic licence.

In later life he was employed in a weaving mill in Alva. On a warm summer's day on 10 July 1867 he left the mill during the day whilst the loom was being reset. He went for a swim in the River Devon around 500 metres (1,600 ft) to the south but failed to return. When colleagues went to search for him he was found drowned. He was aged 50. He is buried in the churchyard of St Ninian's, the grave lying to the east and being marked by a grey granite obelisk.

== Most notable compositions ==
- The Proof of the Puddin' 's the Preein' O' It (a Burns-style sexual allusion)
- The Wreck of the "Countess"
- St Ringan's Glaur
- Grey Hill Plaid (misappropriated by Henry Tucker in USA in 1870 due to lack of international copyright).

== Publications ==
- "Poems and Songs Chiefly in the Scottish Dialect" (1862)
- "The Poems and Songs of David Taylor" by William Harvey, printed by Duncan & Jamieson in 1893
