= George Bruce of Carnock =

Scottish merchant and engineer

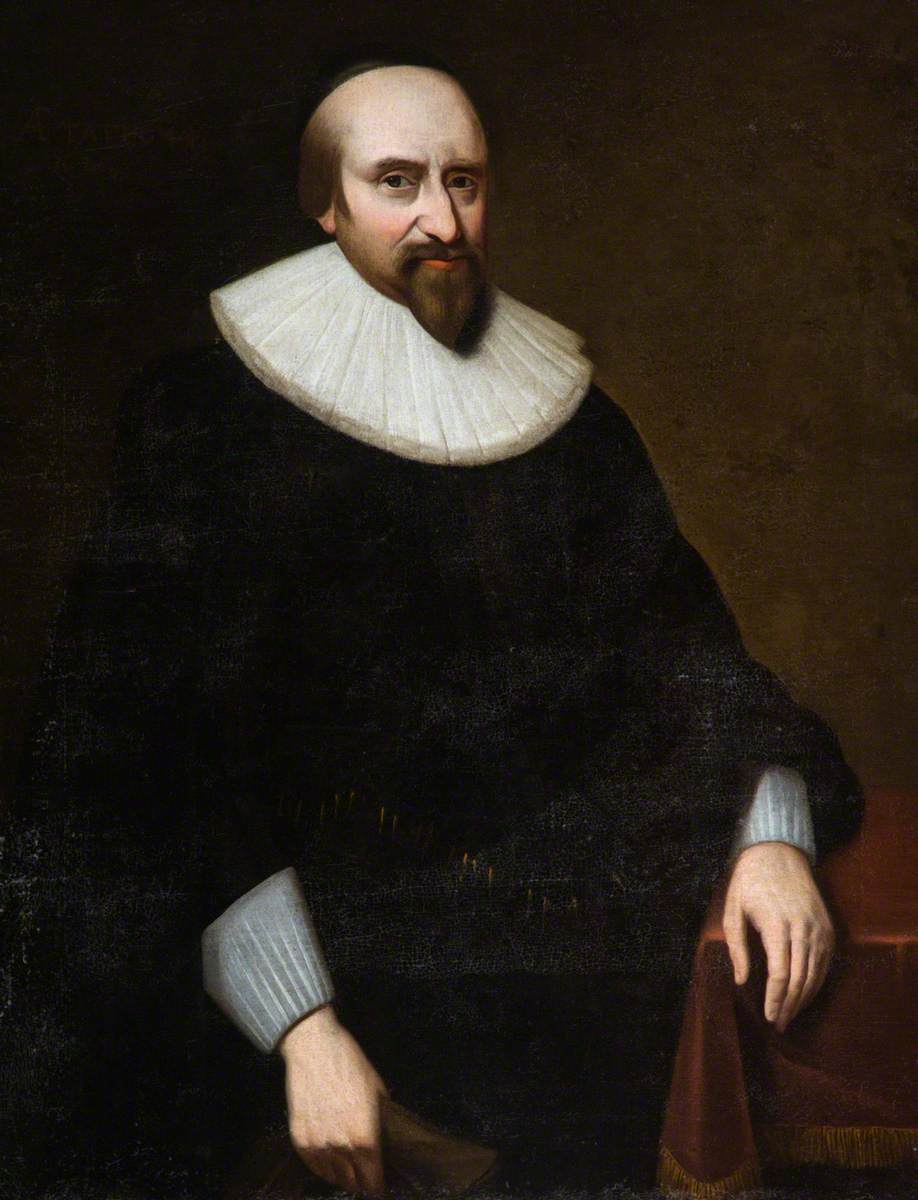
Portrait of George Bruce junior by George Jamesone

Sir George Bruce of Carnock (c. 1550 – 1625) was a Scottish merchant, ship-owner, and mining engineer.

== Family ==
George Bruce was a son of Edward Bruce of Blairhall and Alison Reid, a sister of Robert Reid, Bishop of Orkney. His older brother Edward Bruce (1548-1610), was created Lord Bruce of Kinloss in 1602. Edward Bruce built the large mansion known as Culross House or Abbey House (now reduced in size) and George built Culross Palace.

== Coal, salt, and silver ==
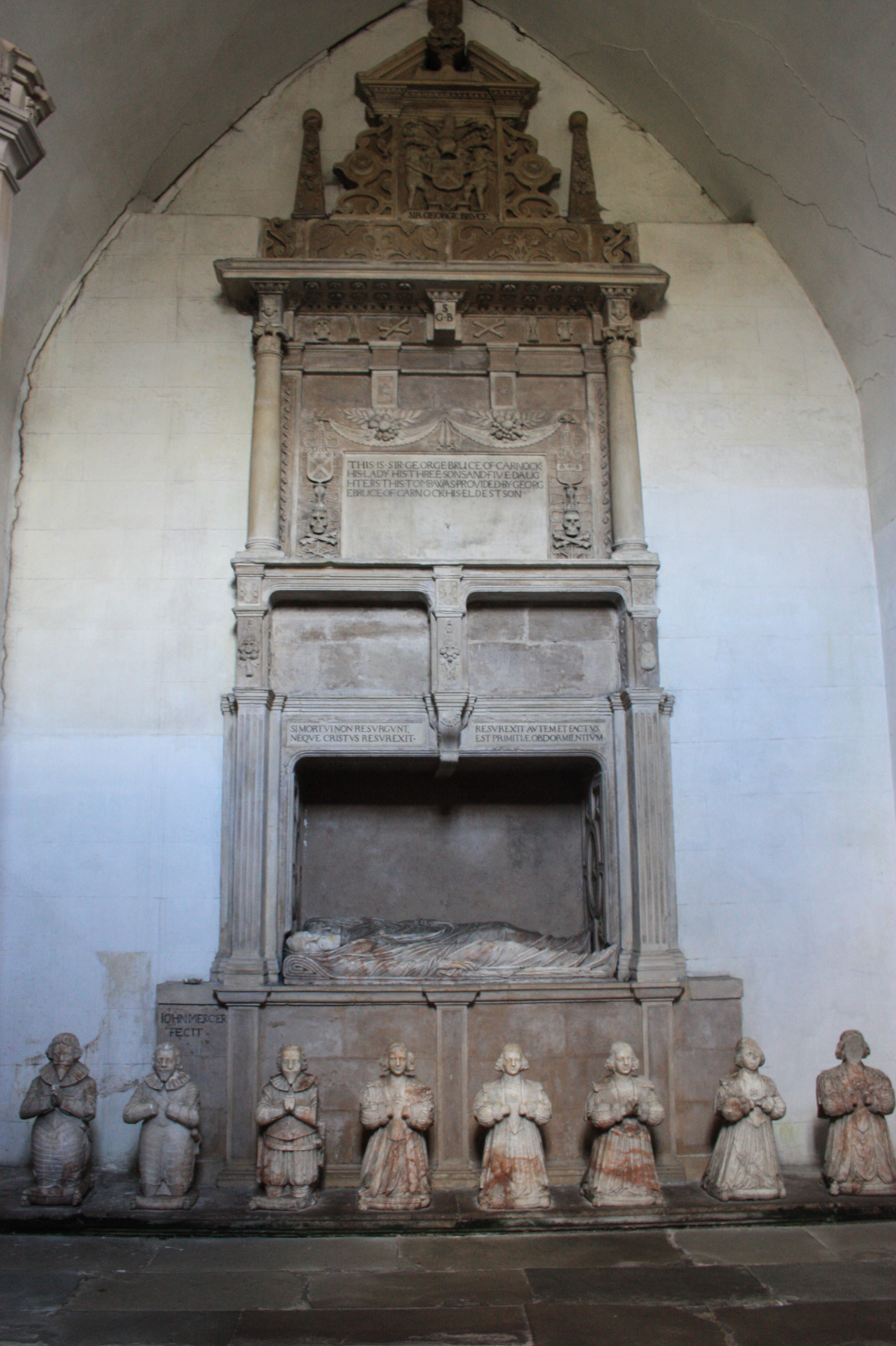
The memorial to Sir George Bruce of Carnock

Bruce was an innovator in coal mining techniques, including the construction of The Moat Pit at Culross, the world's first example of undersea mining which accessed the Upper Hirst seam with use of new drainage technology reaching the previously unheard of depth of 40 fathoms (73m). These innovations attracted much interest, including a visit from King James VI in 1617. Sir George Bruce invited him to visit one of his mines which tunnelled down beneath the sea bed. James ventured into an entrance on land which went far out under the Firth of Forth and found himself emerging at the top of a stone tower sitting a quarter of a mile from shore. Alarmed to find himself surrounded by water, James accused Sir George of an attempt on his life and declared that the whole affair was an act of treason. It was only when George Bruce pointed out the rowing boat and explained that one could either use that or return by the tunnel from whence they came that James relaxed again - and took the option of the boat journey.

John Taylor, an English writer known as the "Water Poet" came to Culross in 1618, and described his visit in the Pennilesse Pilgrimage. Three of Bruce's workmen gave the poet a tour of the mine. Taylor described how the mine had an entrance on land and another entrance through a waterproof tower built on a sandbank with bituminous cement. He was given the choice of returning from the Moat tower via the mine or by boat. Taylor was impressed and wrote that he told George Bruce that the Gunpowder plotters might have learnt from him, or such underground works would be a suitable wine cellar for a London tavern. He also noted a horse drawn drainage machine, later described as an Egyptian wheel, draining the mine with an endless chain with 36 buckets attached, and the extensive salt works. Salt was exported to England and Germany. Ben Jonson also visited in 1618, and recorded the name of the landward mine entrance as the "eye". He saw salt pans at Kincardine, west of Culross, where over 500 people were employed.

The sea tower called the "Moat Pit" and the mine beneath the Forth was inundated by a great storm in March 1625. In 1658 Robert Moray recalled visiting the mine before it was abandoned, and he thought the Earl of Kincardine would not now re-open it. Moray thought George Bruce's idea of mills powered by the tide to drain a mine could be useful again.

George Bruce bought several existing salt pans around Culross and "St Mungo's saltpans", where sea-water was evaporated to make salt for seasoning and for preserving meat. The library of the University of Edinburgh has several charters detailing these acquisitions from 1586 onwards. The equipment of one pan included "buckets, pots, stands, scaffolds, and troughs". Bruce petitioned to sell his salt in London in 1611, undercutting other suppliers, and claiming to employ 1,000 workers.

In 1608 and 1609 Bruce was treasurer of the royal silver-mine at Hilderston near Bathgate. He had a lodging at the works, with furniture from Culross, though day to day supervision was undertaken by his deputy. The mine accounts are held at the National Archives of Scotland.

== Shipping and fishing ==
Bruce was a financier, and offered credit to an English diplomat William Asheby in July 1588. Bruce's factor at Helsingør in Denmark was Frederick Lyall, or Leyell, who managed his exports of salt. Lyall was involved in buying a jewel given by the Earl Marischal to Anne of Denmark at her proxy marriage to James VI.

Bruce and several other merchant ship-owners lost cargoes of London-bought goods in the Falcon of Preston and Jesus of Bo'ness in 1583. The Falcon and the cargo of the Jesus were taken in the Lowestoft road on 17 March by an English sailor, Captain Chaleis, who sailed to Portsmouth. The owners jointly petitioned Elizabeth I for the return of the ship and value of the cargo. James VI also wrote to Elizabeth on their behalf. The value of the loss was estimated at £440 sterling.The ships probably took salt, coal, and other Scottish products to London.

=== Spanish wine and the case of the Bruce ===
George Bruce imported Spanish wine. In 1598 George Bruce was involved in a legal case heard in London involving one of his ships. The incident had occurred in August 1593. His ship, the Bruce, captained by William Stewart of Dundee, went to Ferrol for a cargo of wine, figs, and raisins. Captain Stewart encountered some English merchant ships, the Julian of London and a ship of Southampton, with two pinnaces they had captured. The Julian was a privateer, captained by John Clarke, and cruised the Spanish coast to capture prize cargoes of sugar and Brazilwood dye, at a time when England was at war with Spain.

The Julian shot at the Scottish ship to bring it to. The English ships were overloaded with men captured from Spanish ships. Clerk and Captain Petefer forced Stewart to take 52 men onto the Bruce. These were Portuguese sailors and possibly enslaved African men. The case was discussed by the Privy Council of England. In September 1598, James VI instructed the diplomat David Foulis to discuss the case with Queen Elizabeth I and Sir Robert Cecil. An English diplomat in Scotland, George Nicholson wrote to Sir Robert Cecil urging that George Bruce should "find favourable justice" because his brother Edward Bruce counselled James VI in favour of amity with England. The fate of the Portuguese and Africans aboard the Bruce was not recorded.

=== Iceland waters ===
In 1599 James VI wrote to Christian IV of Denmark seeking permission for Bruce to fish in Iceland waters, with boats crewed with English sailors for the next ten years, after Christian IV had forbidden English fleets to fish in his territories, following Niels Krag's diplomatic mission to England. Christian had declared an eight-mile or two-league broad closed-sea or mare clausum around Iceland.

=== Forth navigation ===
In 1621 King James asked the Privy Council of Scotland to provide warning beacons, lights and bonfires, on the hidden rocks and shallows of the River Forth to improve navigation. George Bruce, after some shipwrecks in the Forth, devised a scheme for the beacons, to be financed by a fraction of custom duty. This prompted the owners of coal mines in the Forth valley to make voluntary contributions for the beacons instead, instead of finding the money by taxing foreign ship-owners.

== Culross Palace ==
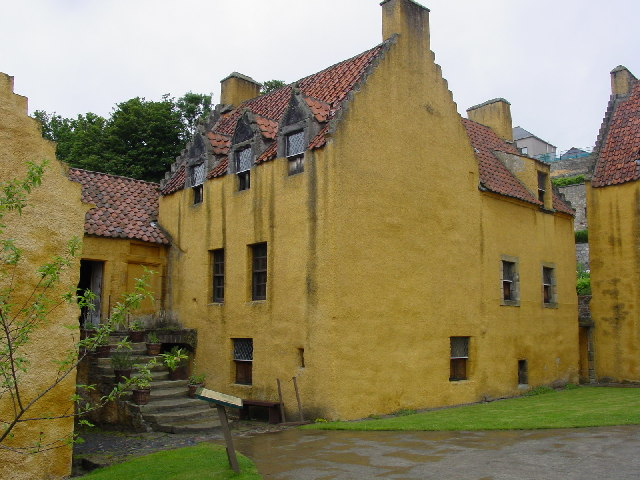
George Bruce's residence at Culross Palace

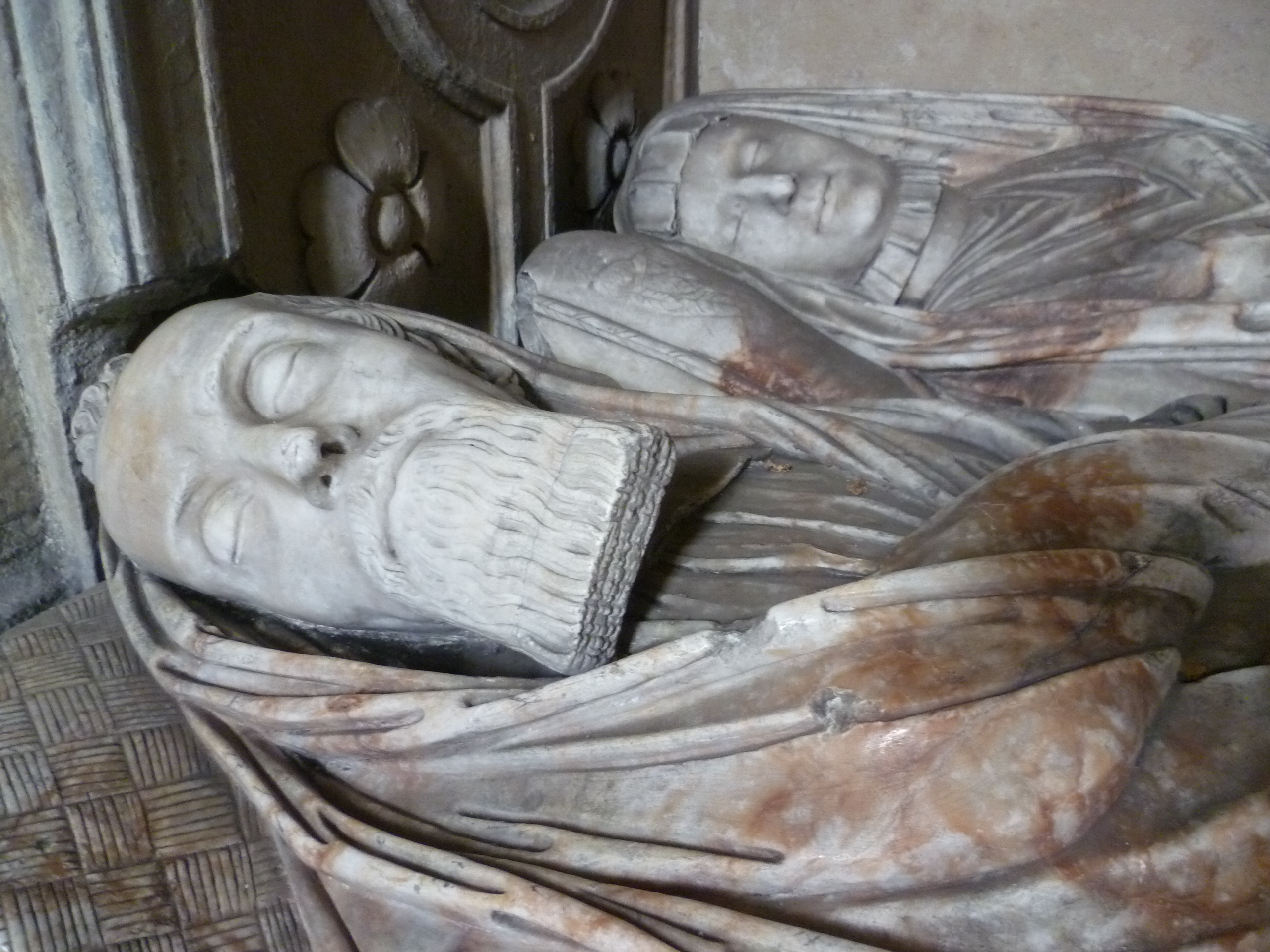
Effigies of George Bruce and Margaret Primrose in Culross Abbey

Between 1597 and 1611, Bruce built a mansion house in Culross, using materials from his foreign trading. This building has subsequently become known as Culross Palace. He lavishly decorated the palace and the stunning painted ceilings with emblems, other ornate features and panelling can still be seen. Culross Palace is now under the care of the National Trust for Scotland and has been restored and conserved in its 17th-century splendour.

The house was mainly built in two campaigns. The south block in 1597 and the north building in 1611, the year when George Bruce was knighted. The renaissance paintwork was restored in 1932 for the National Trust and again in the 1990s by conservators from Historic Environment Scotland. On the second floor of the south block the ceiling painting includes 16 emblems adapted from Geoffrey Whitney's A Choice of Emblemes (London, 1586). The north block has the fragmentary remains of a scene showing the Judgement of Solomon, and extensive original decorative painting.

The palace building, which had faded to a white wash, has been restored to its original yellow-orange harled exterior. The courtyard path and the garden have also been remodelled, with the garden now full of vegetables, herbs and plants, growing as they would have done in the 17th century.

When George Bruce acquired the lands of Sillietoun Easter in 1599, he undertook to carry sand to the building works of Anne of Denmark at Dunfermline Palace. Bruce also acquired the Fife estate of Carnock. In 1602 he repaired the church there. Bruce helped the minister of Carnock John Row by supplying coal to Archbishop Spottiswoode.

== Death ==
Bruce died on 6 May 1625 and was buried in Culross Abbey, now used as the parish church of Culross and Torryburn.

His outstanding memorial (in the north chapel) by the mason John Mercer, shows him lying with his wife whilst his eight children, three sons and five daughters, pray, facing outward at the base as half-size figures. A plank on the ground at the base recorded the deaths of the children.

== Marriages and family ==
George married Margaret Primrose, only daughter of Archibald Primrose, 1st Laird of Burnbrae (a property of Culross Abbey), Writer, whose son, James Primrose, was Principal Clerk to the Privy Council. His second wife was Euphame Primrose, a daughter of David Primrose who lived in Culross. His children included:

- George Bruce, 2nd of Carnock (d. 1643), who married Mary Preston, daughter of John Preston of Valleyfield, and was the father of the Earl of Kincardine
- Robert Bruce of Broomhall (d. 1652), who married Helen Skene, a granddaughter of the diplomat John Skene
- Anne Bruce, who married James Arnot of Fernie
- Christian Bruce, who married (1) Robert Colville, Master of Colville, son of James Colville of Easter Wemyss and Isobel Ruthven, and (2) Laurence Mercer of Aldie
- Magdalene Bruce, who married John Erskine of Balgownie
- Nicholas Bruce (d. 1670), who married (1) John Morrison of Dairsie, and (2) John Dick of Braid (died 1642), son of William Dick of Braid.
- Margaret Bruce (d. 1652), who moved to England in 1609. She married Francis Nicholls, an English lawyer

== Legacy ==
In 2015 he was inducted into the Scottish Engineering Hall of Fame.
