= The Moat Pit at Culross =

16th-century undersea mining site in Scotland

The Moat Pit at Culross, also called the Coal Mine in the Sea, is a site of 16th-century undersea mining in Culross, Scotland. It is the world's first known example of undersea mining. It was built around 1590, and operated for 35 years before being overwhelmed and flooded during the Great Storm on 30 March 1625.

The pit is located at the western end of the village, sitting on the foreshore roughly 400m south of the high water mark, yet still visible at low tide. It consisted of a stone tower rising above the sea, buttressed by concentric retaining walls which contained a shaft that provided access to the principal coal seam of the area at a depth of around 40 ft (12 m). It was linked by one or more tunnels to at least one other mine entrance situated on land close to the high water mark.

The pit was a significant part of a mining complex developed by Sir George Bruce of Carnock and later his son, George Bruce II of Carnock, and grandsons, Edward Bruce 1st Earl of Kincardine and Alexander Bruce 2nd Earl of Kincardine in the period 1575–1676. The coal that was produced was a foundation for the development of local industries in salt extraction, metalworking and glass manufacture that together was said to represent Scotland's first integrated industrial complex.

The pit was famous in the early 17th century, principally for its working under the sea, but also for its pioneering drainage system using an "Egyptian Wheel". This attracted famous visitors including King James VI and I, the English poets John Taylor and Ben Jonson, Sir Robert Moray and Lord Walden.

== Description ==
The Moat Pit was a stone-built circular tower consisting of 3 concentric walls around a mine shaft at the centre. The shaft gave access to a coal seam, the Upper Hirst, known locally as the "Jenny Pate", 40 ft (12 m) below the level of the foreshore. The name 'Moat Pit' is a corruption of the french word 'Motte' meaning mound, being a reference to the rock outcrop on which the tower was built.

Today there is little evidence of the Moat Pit's existence. At low tide it is possible to make out the remaining stones of the original structure, lying on the foreshore on a low rock outcrop, 400m due south of Blairburn. The shaft has been infilled with stone, but on the foreshore sections of the foundations can be identified.

The diameter of the tower at its base is 15.54 metres. The shaft at its centre had a diameter of 4.2m. Each of the walls is of dressed stone without evidence of mortar. The gap between the inner and middle wall appears to have been filled with puddled clay. This would have prevented sea water entering the shaft. The void between the middle and outer wall was filled with rough stone, possibly to provide protection from the sea to the middle wall. The base of the tower is 1.7m above the height of the lowest tide. The tidal range at Culross is 6.3m, so the tower would have needed to be more than 5 metres high to give protection against the sea.

== Shafts on the foreshore and the Egyptian Wheel ==
John Taylor, describing the works in 1618, wrote that the Moat Pit was linked underground to an entrance on land but also mentions a well close to land, Jonson mentions one entrance on land "called the eye". Cummings recounts being told there were "two sinks within the sea at Castlehills, the one a dip, the other an outer bearing door, also moted, it not being far within the sea". A sink was a shaft or tunnel, a dip was probably a tunnel following the dip of the coal seam. Any archaeological remains of these shafts would have been subsumed by the construction of the railway in 1906. A mote is a general reference to the walled construction used to keep the sea out of shafts sunk on the foreshore below the high water mark.

The well would have been a shaft which was deeper than the mine workings and to which water seepage into the mine could be drained. Drainage was a major challenge in coal mine development and the solution used at Culross was as much a wonder as the Moat Pit itself. Taylor wrote:

The sea at certain places doth leake or soak into the mine, which, by the industry of Sir George Bruce, is all conveyed to one well neare the land, where he hath a device like a horse-mill, that with 3 horses and a great chain of iron, going downward many fathoms, with thirty-six buckets fastened to the chaine, of which eighteen go down still to be filled, and eighteene ascend up to be emptied, which do emptie themselves (without any man's labour) into a trough that conveys the water into the sea.

More detail of this particular machine is not known, but similar devices of the period used buckets made of leather or wood, and a cog and rung mechanism would transfer power from a central vertical horse driven shaft to a horizontal shaft which carried the endless chain over a guide wheel.

Such a device might raise 1-1.5 tonnes an hour from a depth of 30m after allowing for considerable friction, or more if regular changes of horses could be afforded and they could be driven at a trot. Archibald Cochrane, 9th Earl of Dundonald, writing in 1793, states that the drainage operated to a depth of 40 fathoms (73 metres), a figure supported by Sir Robert Moray.

It is known that a watermill was also employed to power drainage using water from the nearby Dean Burn, as a legal dispute was recorded in the papers of the Privy Council in 1607 recording both horse-gin and watermill in use.

== History ==
During its working life the Moat Pit was considered a significant engineering achievement and received many visitors. The most detailed contemporary account comes from the poet John Taylor, who visited in July 1618. He tells of two entrances on land to the mine itself, one a shaft and the other a dip (thought to be a downsloping tunnel). He entered by sea and was conducted underground from the Moat Pit, from whence he returned to land. He observed that the passage between the two was vaulted and high enough to stand, with many nooks and by-ways off to the sides. Taylor went on to report that the pit had been operating for 28 to 29 years at the time of his visit and in that time the workings had followed the coal seam and extended for "more than an English mile" under the sea. On construction the seam had been found 40 ft down (12 metres), presumably from the level of the foreshore. Water did leak into the workings, but this was drained back to a central well, described as near the land, which was "many fathoms" deep (a fathom being 6 ft (1.8 m) and drained by a horse gin.

Another poet, Ben Jonson, visited that September. The description of his visit was thought to have been lost in a fire in 1623, but recently notes of the visit have been found written by an anonymous companion. The notes provide no description of the mine itself, but provide useful corroboration of output figures given by Taylor.

King James I & VI visited in July 1617. He entered by land and was greatly shocked to come out at the Moat Pit surrounded by sea. He is said to have shouted "Treason". He returned to shore by boat.

On 30 March 1625, a great storm resulted in an extraordinarily high tide that flooded the coal workings and washed away salt pans and other infrastructure, as well as wreaking havoc in Leith and along the shores of the Firth of Forth. Sir George Bruce died 5 weeks later. Dundonald wrote that the mining fell into disuse although attempts were made to pump out the workings. Further shafts were sunk to the east of Culross but Dundonald writes that mining ceased in 1676. By that time mining had moved east to deeper but richer deposits at Valleyfield.

== Other shafts and moat pits around Culross ==
The Moat Pit and the connected well with its Egyptian Wheel were the most notable part of more extensive mine workings around Culross. Abandonment Plans held by the Coal Authority show 19 more shafts in the vicinity, of which at least three more were moated. From the account of Cummings it is believed these all date between 1575 and 1676. One of these, St Mungo's Pit, is still visible (but not signed). It sits in the corner of the football pitch at the east end of Culross, by the eastern public car park. It is fenced off, and largely filled in, but the top of the moat wall can be seen. Originally this area would have been below the high water mark on the foreshore, but the construction of the rail line in 1906 and subsequent land reclamation have altered the landscape. St Mungo's Pit was connected underground to Nun's Pit which was on land 100 metres to the north. The workings pre-date 1608 and it is entirely possible these workings were a prototype for the Moat Pit and its linked drainage shaft.

A second moat, the Valleyfield Pit, was built on a rock outcrop some 500 metres south of the foreshore to the east of St Mungo's and was connected underground to Patie's Pit. Cummings recalls this working in his youth. The Valleyfield Moat now lies buried under the promontory created by the disposal of ash from Longannet power station; the extent of any archaeological remains is not known.

== Use of coal ==
The primary use of and market for Culross coal was the manufacture of salt by evaporation from seawater, in panhouses situated in and around Culross itself. This process required seawater to be heated and liquid boiled off to leave behind crystals of salt. Salt pans varied in size but indicatively would be 18 ft by 9 ft by 18inches (5.5m by 2.7m by 0.46m). A pan of this size would hold 1,430 gallons (6,500 litres) of seawater. Lower down the Firth of Forth seawater contained 2.85% salt although at Culross salinity might have been lower if seawater was extracted when fresh water from the Forth and Avon could dilute salinity levels. The coal at Culross was sub-bituminous with a lower calorific value than bituminous or anthracitic coals. This was actually favourable for salt production for two reasons, the lower combustion temperature was less damaging to the salt pans which were constructed of low grade metals, and the low temperature resulted in a slower burning coal with less vigorous boiling that produced larger salt crystals.

Each ton of salt required at least 35 tons of seawater. The ability to locate pans close to the sea was a critical factor for success. It took 6-8 tons of coal to produce 1 ton of salt, so proximity of coal supply to pans was critical, as road transport for heavy materials was virtually non-existent in 16th-century Scotland.

== Markets and export ==
Coal that could be mined in larger lumps, termed "great coile", attracted a higher price and would be used for domestic heating and cooking. The market in Scotland would have been limited with Edinburgh the only sizeable town. Large coal was preferred partly because small coal could easily be contaminated with rock and stone that was difficult for the customer to detect. It was exported to coastal ports in northern Europe and, when exports and imports were allowed, into England as well where "Scotch coal" enjoyed a strong reputation probably because it burned more slowly and its lower combustion temperature made it more suitable for domestic hearths and grates that were still adapting from the use of wood. Scottish coal was transported to England by Bernard Lindsay, and Alexander Elphinstone, 4th Lord Elphinstone obtained a licence to export great coals in 1608.

Scottish coal was used in the glass manufacturing house established by Edward Zouch at Lambeth, and patents for glass manufacture (in 1614) favoured Scottish coal.
