= Portmoak =

Coordinates: 56.21°N 3.31°W

Portmoak (Scottish Gaelic: Port Mhochain or Port Mhogha, lit. 'the port of Saint Serf') is a parish in Kinross-shire, Scotland. It consists of a group of settlements running north to south: Glenlomond, Wester Balgedie, Easter Balgedie, Kinnesswood, Kilmagadwood and Scotlandwell.

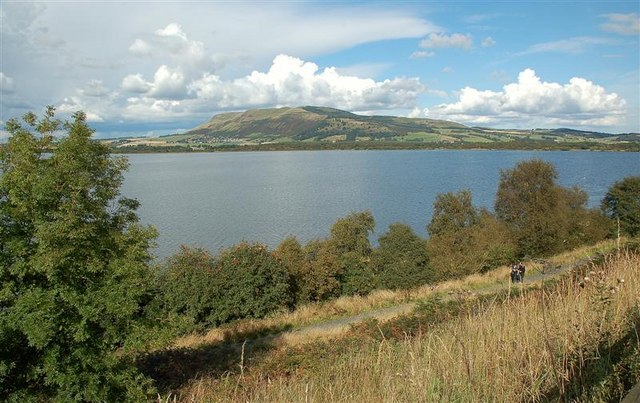
A view from across Loch Leven of Bishop Hill with Portmoak in the foreground

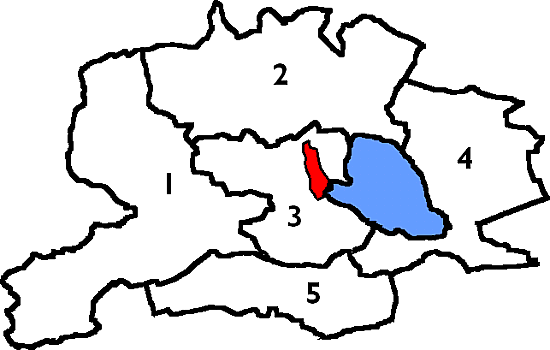
Parishes of Kinross-shire. Portmoak is no. 4

Portmoak used to be the harbour for boats to St Serf's Inch, where Lochleven priory used to be. The name Moak probably derives from the Gaelic mogh / mochan (serf / little serf) as the Gaelic name for the saint, although the church in Portmoak was dedicated to St Moanus, who may or may not be the same person.

The main villages are Kinnesswood and Scotlandwell.

== Geography ==
The parish is on the east side of Kinross-shire lying between Loch Leven and Fife. It is bounded by the parishes of Cleish, Kinross, Orwell, Strathmiglo, Falkland, Leslie, Kinglassie, Auchterderran and Ballingry.

The area is a rich landscape of braes, crags, fine meadows, fertile fields and plantations.

== Bishop Hill ==
The entire area of Portmoak is dominated by Bishop Hill, 1,512 ft (461 m) high, one of the Lomond Hills, known locally as "the bishop". On its lower reaches are oak, rowan and Scots pine.

It is best approached by walkers from Scotlandwell. As you climb to the top of Bishop Hill, passing the subsidiary top of Munduff Hill as you go, you may see good views of Loch Leven, the Firth of Forth, Bass Rock, North Berwick Law, Mossmorran, the rain radar tower at the top of Munduff hill, the Ochils, the Forth Bridge, Schiehallion, the distant Cairngorms, West Lomond, East Lomond and Largo Law.

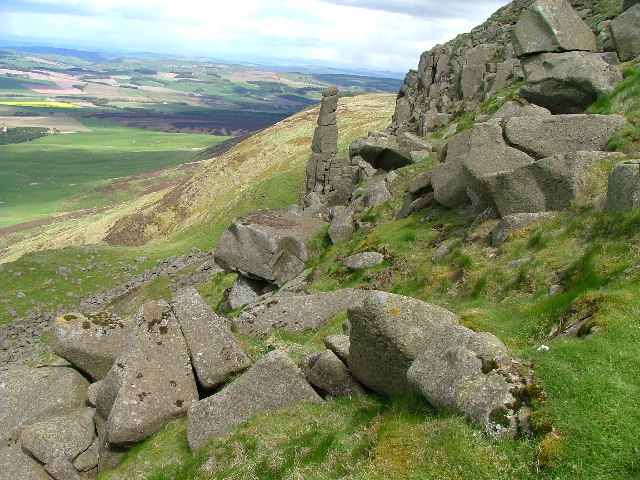
Carlin Maggie in 2005

The site of Carlin Maggie is on the western slope of Bishop Hill, overlooking Loch Leven.

Good views of Bishop hill and Munduff Hill can be had from nearby Benarty Hill in Fife.

== History ==
Portmoak was formerly a parish of Fife. The area has always relied on farming and, until the late 19th century, limestone quarried down from the hills.

As the name implies, Scotlandwell is home to a well where King Robert the Bruce is reputed to have been cured of leprosy by drinking the waters. At one time it was an important monastic centre; the monks ran a hospital here from which patients took the spring water as part of their treatment. Pilgrims journeyed from St. Andrews The monks would have been linked to the nearby Portmoak Priory. On the corner of the Leslie Road, sits The Well Country Inn, reported to have been constructed in 84AD. The present building incorporates part of the old coaching inn that served the village in medieval times.

Now a commuter village Wester Balgedie or Meikle Balgedie lies 4 miles east of Kinross overlooking Loch Leven. At a fork in the road stands the Balgedie Toll Tavern, a building dating from the 19th Century. A tavern has stood here from around 1534.

Two woods, Kilmagad Wood and Portmoak Moss are situated adjacent to the villages of and Kinnesswood and Scotlandwell.

Kilmagadwood is known to the locals as The Cuckoo Wood.

Portmoak has an amateur football team competing in the Perthshire 3rd division.

== Portmoak Airfield ==
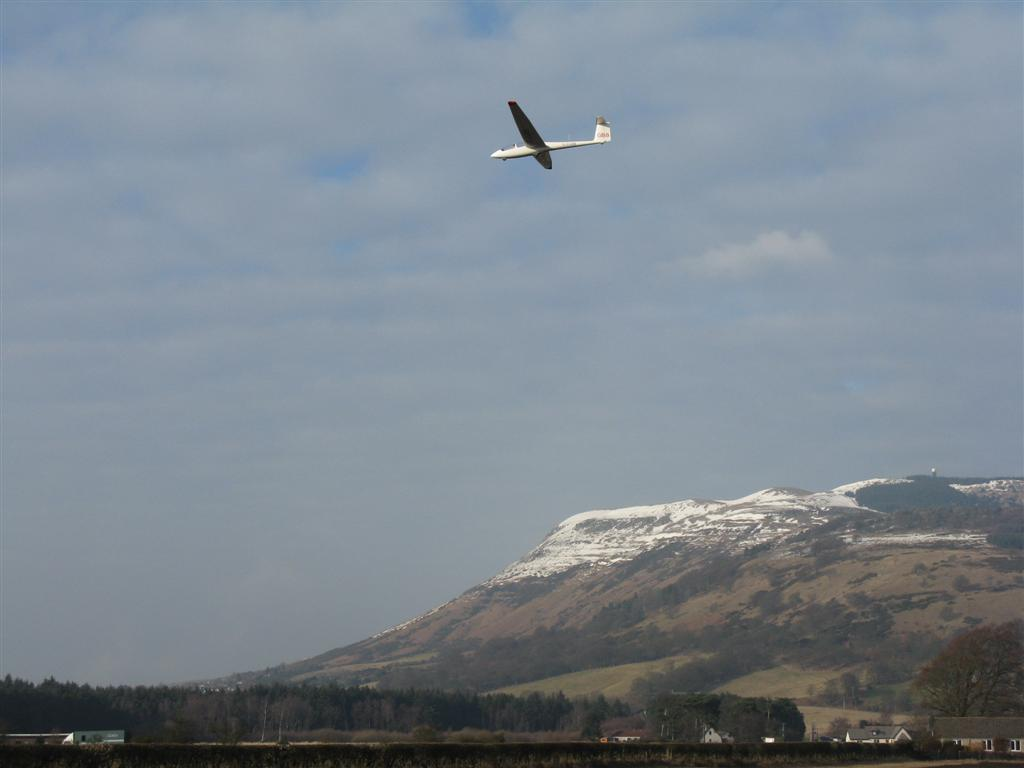
Bishop Hill

Portmoak Airfield (aka Kinross Airfield) lies between Scotlandwell and Loch Leven.

The Scottish Gliding Union at Portmoak Airfield, Scotlandwell is the largest gliding club in Scotland.

The airfield has no hangar space and is primarily used for gliding. Gliders are launched either by ground-based winches or aero-towed by single engine aeroplanes capable of take off and landing on the short grass runway.

== Parish church ==
The Pre-Reformation church was a chapel served by Portmoak Priory and was first dedicated to St. Monan then to St. Stephen.

The present Portmoak Parish Church building, built in 1832, is the third on the site. The church bell is dated 1642. The surrounding graveyard is older than the church, and the Celtic crosses are of the 10th or 11th centuries. A memorial stone in the graveyard is for Michael Bruce, 1746 to 1767, poet and author of several scripture paraphrases used in Church of Scotland worship. On 29 October 2013 the Rev Dr Angus Morrison, minister at Orwell and Portmoak Parish Church since 2011, was nominated to be Moderator of the General Assembly of the Church of Scotland for 2014–15, but in March 2014 he had to withdraw his nomination on grounds of ill health. Orwell church, in Milnathort, had previously been separate.

The remaining operational Church of Scotland parish church is officially called Orwell and Portmoak Parish Church.

Historic ministers included John Bruce who served from 1666 but was dismissed in 1690 for drunkenness. Ebenezer Erskine was minister of Portmoak from 1703 to 1731 before translating to Stirling. John Mudie (primus) was minister from 1743 to 1762 and his son John Mudie (secondus) continued to 1784. In 1802 Hugh Laird DD took over and at the Disruption of 1843 he joined the Free Church and served as minister of the Free Church of Portmoak until his death in 1849.

== Famous residents ==
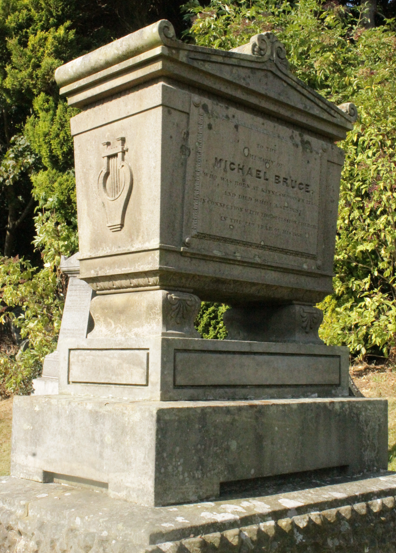
The grave of Michael Bruce in Portmoak churchyard

- James Braid (surgeon)
- Michael Bruce (poet)
- The Rev. Ebenezer Erskine
- Rev Andrew Grant Chaplain in Ordinary to three successive kings, Moderator in 1808
- Very Rev James Grant DD FRSE DCL (1800–1890) son of the above, Director of Scottish Widows for 50 years (1840–1890) and Moderator of the General Assembly of the Church of Scotland in 1854.
- Very Rev John Laird (1811–1896) Moderator of the General Assembly to the Free Church of Scotland in 1889.
