= John Winram =

Scottish church leader (1492–1582)

John Winram or Wynram or Wynrame or Winraham
- John Winram's tombstone

Personal details
- Born: 1492
- Died: 28 September 1582 (aged 89–90)
- Denomination: Christian
- Education: St. Andrews

John Winram (1492–1582) was a 16th-century Scottish priest and ecclesiastical reformer. He was born in 1492, the son of one James Winram of Ratho and his wife Margaret Wilkie. He obtained a Bachelor's Degree (1515), a Master's Degree (x 1532) and a Doctorate (1541) from St Leonard's College, University of St Andrews.

He had become an Augustinian canon at St Andrews Cathedral Priory by 1527, becoming sub-prior by the end of 1535. By then, he was de facto leader of the house, since the commendator-prior was James Stewart, born only in 1531 and still a minor. In 1553 he was appointed to be Prior of St Serf's Inch, Lochleven.

In his roles at St Andrews and St Serf's Inch, he was able to exert an influence on the national church. He was a keen reformer, but it was not until the Scottish Reformation came fully into being that he accepted a break with the Roman Catholic Church. Winram played a leading role in the early organisation of the newly independent Scottish Church, maintaining a high work-load as an administrator into his 80s.

Winram had married Margaret Stewart, the illegitimate daughter of Alexander Stewart, Bishop of Moray, in 1562. By this marriage he obtained two stepsons, Robert and Andrew. The former suffered from severe disability, though the latter was healthy and he and Winram had a mutually beneficial relationship until the death of Margaret led to a dispute about her will. The dispute raged through the courts of south-eastern Scotland, and their relationship never recovered. Winram died on 28 September 1582. He was buried in the chapel of St Leonard's College.

== Career ==
John Winram (1492?–1582), was a Scottish reformer, descended from the Winrams or Winrahams of Kirkness or Ratho, Fifeshire. He was born about 1492. Entering the college of St. Leonard's, St. Andrews, in 1513, he graduated B.A. 17 March 1515. As early at least as 1528 he was an inmate of the Augustinian monastery of St. Andrews, of which he became third prior in 1534 and sub-prior in 1536, the prior being Lord James Stewart (afterwards Earl of Moray), who was then in his minority.

== Role at Wishart's trial ==
At the trial of George Wishart in 1546 Winram preached the opening sermon, the subject being "Heresy," which he very safely defined as "a false opinion defended with pertinacitie, cleirlye repugning to the word of God" (summary in Knox and in Lindsay of Pitscottie's Chronicle, pp. 459–60). In reality the sermon contained nothing to which Wishart himself would not have been willing to subscribe, and the general and colourless character of its propositions indicated at least a tendency towards toleration. That Wishart believed the sub-prior to be favourably disposed towards him may be inferred from the fact that while waiting in the castle of St. Andrews before execution it was for him he sent in order to make his confession. "Go, fetch me," he said, "yonder man that preached this day, and I will make my confession unto him". Knox is unable "to show" what Wishart said "in this confession," but Lindsay affirms that Winram informed Beaton that Wishart had declared his innocence and asked the consent of Beaton that he should "have the communion," which was refused (Chronicle, p. 476).

== Relationship with Knox and clergy ==
In regard to Knox, Winram adopted a similarly impartial attitude. He was present at Knox's first sermon preached in the chapel of the castle of St. Andrews in 1547, and, after the sermon, called him before a convention of the grey and black friars in the yard of St. Leonard's, not "to hear as judge, but only familiarly to talk." After arguing with Knox in a very half-hearted fashion, Winram left further discussion in the hands of Arbuckle, the grey friar; but Knox represents his own triumph in the argument as complete; and although the friars resolved that, as an antidote to Knox's teaching, every learned man in the city, beginning with the sub-prior, should preach a series of sermons in the parish kirk, the sermons, according to Knox, were "penned so as to offend no man". Winram was present at the meeting of the provincial council held in Edinburgh in November 1549, at which special resolutions were passed for reforming the lives of the clergy (Robertson, Stat. Eccles. Scot. ii. 82–4); and by some he is supposed to have been the author of the catechism, known generally as Archbishop Hamilton's, approved by a provincial council held at Edinburgh in January 1552.

== Winram as reformer ==
Although present at the trial of Walter Milne in 1558 and at a provincial council held in 1559, Winram cast in his lot with the reformers as soon as their cause seemed likely to prevail; and, being nominated by the lords superintendent of Fife, 9 July 1560, he was admitted at St. Andrews 13 April 1561. He is sometimes included among those to whom was entrusted the compilation of the first confession of faith; but, on the contrary, it was to him and William Maitland of Lethington that the confession was submitted for revision, and they mitigated "the austeritie of maynie words and sentences which seemed to proceed rather of some evil-conceived opinion than of any sound judgment" (Randolph to Cecil, 7 Sept. 1560). He was present at the parliament at which it was ratified, and spoke in its support (Randolph to Cecil, 19 Aug.), and, after the ratification, was appointed one of a commission to draw up the "Book of Discipline".

== Character ==
Winram is described by Quentin Kennedy as "wonderfullie learnit baith in the New Testament, Auld Testament, and mekle mair [much more]" ("Ane Compendious Reasoning,"), and it is very clear that he was more of a scholar than a controversialist. He seems not to have been specially enamoured of the puritanic Calvinism of the leading Scottish reformers, and in his final adherence to the Reformation he was probably influenced mainly by considerations of expediency. At nearly every general assembly from 1562 to 1570 complaint was made against him as superintendent for slackness in visitation and preaching; and his "immersion in worldly affairs" also gave offence to the more censorious.

== Offices ==
As prior of Portmoak Winram was present at the Perth convention of 27 July 1569 (Reg. P. C. Scotl. ii. 2). He also attended the convention held at Leith in January 1572, at which the creation of the 'tulchan' bishops was authorised; and under the new arrangement he was made archdeacon of the diocese, resigning the superintendentship of Fife to the new archbishop, and being designated instead superintendent of Strathearn. When Knox declined to inaugurate the new archbishop of St. Andrews, Winram, at the conclusion of Knox's sermon, undertook that duty. On the death of the archbishop in 1574 he resumed the superintendentship of Fife. As prior of Portmoak he attended a convention at Holyrood House, 5 March 1574, and on 29 July 1580 he conveyed the priory of Portmoak to St. Leonard's College, St. Andrews. He died on 28 September 1582. Winram was married, 12 July 1564, to Margaret Stewart, relict of Ayton of Kinaldy.

== Publications ==
- A Catechism (of which no copy is known to exist)

== Bibliography ==
- Histories by Knox, Buchanan, Leslie, and Calderwood
- Reg. P. C. Scotl. vols. ii–iii.
- Wodrow's Biographical Collections
- Hew Scott's Fasti Eccles. Scot. ii. 822–5.
- Wodrow Biog. i.,
- Scott's Reformers,
- Knox's Works i., ii.,
- Keith, and Calderwood's Hist.,
- Acts Parl. iii.,
- Booke of the Kirk,
- M'Crie's Knox, and Melville
- Reg. Min.
- Melville's Autob.
- Zurich Lett. ii.
- Lyon's Monuments of St Andrews, Bannatyne i.
- Maitland Miscell. iii.
- Test. Reg. (Edin, and St And)
- New Statistical Account of Scotland ix., &c.

Religious titles
| Preceded by David Guthrie | Prior of Loch Leven; 1552–1582 | Succeeded by none * *Priory handed over to St Leonard's College in 1582 |
