= John Laird (minister) =

Scottish minister (1811–1896)

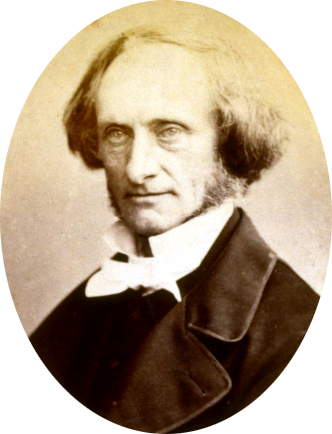
- John Laird by Thomas Rodger
- Church: Church of Scotland; Free Church of Scotland

Personal details
- Born: 8 August 1811
- Died: 19 April 1896 (aged 84)

assistant minister of Arbroath
- In office 19 March 1835 – 11 August 1836

minister of Inverkeilor Parish
- In office 11 August 1836 – May 1843

minister of Inverkeilor Free Church
- In office May 1843 – 28 December 1847

minister of Free St George's Church, Montrose
- In office 28 December 1847 – 26 August 1853

minister of Free Church, Cupar-Fife
- In office 26 August 1853 – 19 April 1896

Moderator of the General Assembly of the Free Church of Scotland
- In office 23 May 1889 – 1890

John Laird (1811–1896) was a Scottish minister of the Free Church of Scotland who served as Moderator of the General Assembly to the Free Church 1889/90.

== Life ==
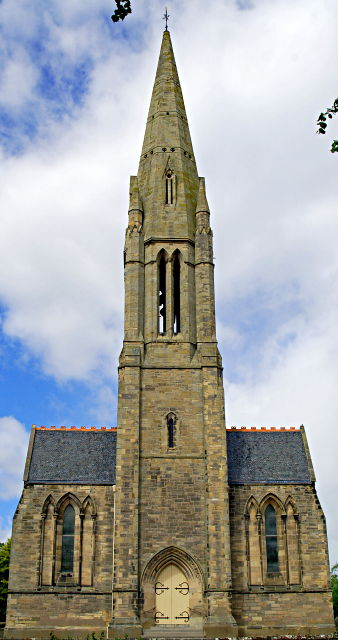
Cupar Free Church

He was born in the manse at Portmoak on the banks of Loch Leven, the son of Hugh Laird (d.1849). His father was minister of the parish from 1802 to 1843 and the Free Church minister until his death in 1849.

He studied divinity at the University of Edinburgh and was ordained by the Church of Scotland at Arbroath in 1835. He was translated to Inverkeilor in 1836. He left the established church in the Disruption of 1843 and joined the Free Church of Scotland. In 1847 he became minister of the Free St George's Church in Montrose. In 1853 he translated to the Free Church in Cupar, replacing Adam Cairns.

In 1870 he organised the rebuilding of the Free Church in Cupar. This was designed by Campbell Douglas and occupied from 1875 but the huge spire was not completed until 1879. In May 1881, J. T. Ferguson of Glasgow was appointed his colleague and successor.

In 1889 he was elected Moderator of the General Assembly. He was succeeded in 1890 by Thomas Brown.

He died in 1896.

== Works ==
- Hearing the Word, a sermon
- Sermon on the Death of Captain A. O. Dalgleish, Cupar-Fife
- Sermon LXI. (Free Church Pulpit, ii., 89)
- Sermons [Memorial Sketch (portrait by his son David)] (Edinburgh, 1897). —
- Presb. Review, viii.

== Family ==
He married 5 November 1840, Agnes Maule (born 11 May 1822, died 11 December 1887), daughter of Thomas Anderson, farmer, Westhaven, Carnoustie, and Jean Sim, and had issue —

- Hugh Alexander, merchant, Rangoon, Burma, born 1 December 1841, died 21 August 1911
- Jane Catherine, born 10 February 1843, died 31 May 1873
- John George, mercantile clerk, born 21 November 1848, died 12 August 1867
- Henry James, merchant, London, born 27 June 1853
- David Michael William, born 1 April 1856, minister of the Free Church, Durris, Kincardineshire, 1884-1904, died in Edinburgh, March 1924
- Alexander Anderson, banker, London, born 8 October 1859, died 22 July 1922.

John's grandson, by his son D. M. W. Laird was the philosopher John Laird.

Two of his brothers, Alexander Oswald Laird of Dundee, and Henry Laird of Leslie, Fife were Free Church ministers. Two of his sisters married Free Church ministers: Rev Spiers of Kinglassie and Rev James Swinton of Portmoak (his father's successor).
