= Glenlomond =

Coordinates: 56.229363°N 3.341964°W

Glenlomond: Scottish Gaelic: Gleann Laomainn
- Location within Perth and Kinross
- OS grid reference: NO169049
- Council area: Perth and Kinross
- Lieutenancy area: Perth and Kinross
- Country: Scotland
- Sovereign state: United Kingdom
- Post town: Kinross
- Postcode district: KY13
- Dialling code: 01592
- Police: Scotland
- Fire: Scottish
- Ambulance: Scottish
- UK Parliament: Perth and Kinross-shire
- Scottish Parliament: Ochil

Glenlomond (Scottish Gaelic: Gleann Laomainn) is a village in Perth and Kinross, Scotland. It lies northeast of Loch Leven, north of the A911 road, at the foot of Bishop Hill in the Lomond Hills. It is approximately 4 miles (6 kilometres) east of Kinross.
