= Michael Bruce (poet) =

Scottish poet and hymnist (1746–1767)

- Born: 27 March 1746; Portmoak, Kinross-shire, Scotland
- Died: 5 July 1767 (aged 21)
- Occupation(s): poet, hymnist
- Notable work: Elegy written in Spring

Michael Bruce (27 March 1746 – 5 July 1767) was a Scottish poet and hymnist.

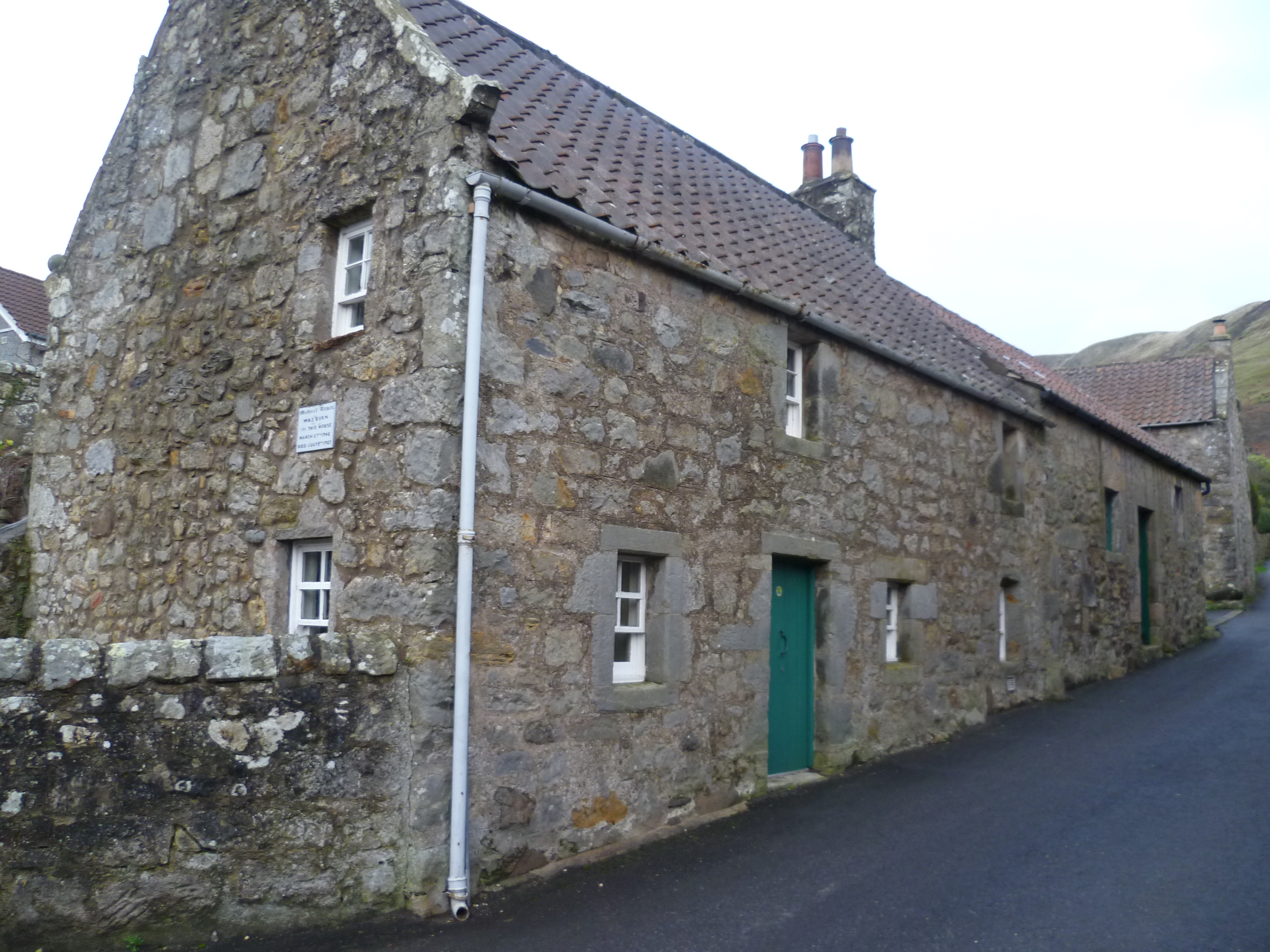
Birthplace and home of Michael Bruce

== Early life ==
Bruce was born at Kinnesswood in the parish of Portmoak, Kinross-shire. His father, Alexander Bruce, was a weaver. Michael was taught to read before he was four years old, and one of his favourite books was a copy of Sir David Lyndsay's works. His attendance at school was often interrupted, because he had to herd cattle on the Lomond Hills in summer, and this early companionship with nature greatly influenced his poetry. A delicate child, he grew up as the pet of his family and friends. He studied Latin and Greek, and at fifteen, when his schooling was completed, a small legacy left to his mother, with some additions from kindly neighbours, enabled him to go to the University of Edinburgh, which he attended during the four winter sessions 1762–1765.

== Adult life ==
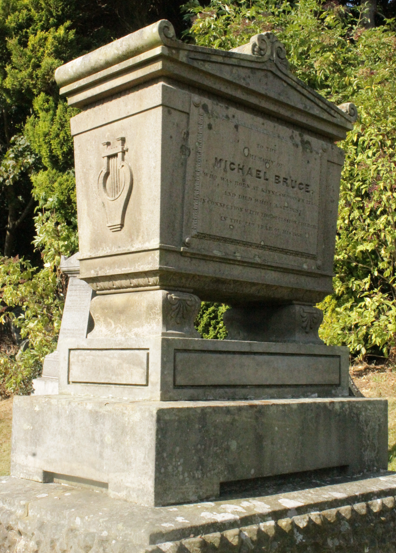
The grave of Michael Bruce in Portmoak churchyard

In 1765 he taught during the summer months at Gairney Bridge, receiving about 5/- a year in fees and free board in a pupil's home. He became a divinity student at the Theological Hall, Kinross, with a Scottish seceding church, classified at that time as the Burghers. Bruce was sincere in his Christian deportment and it was said of him 'Religion was obviously with him a matter of experience'.,'only an evangelical Christian of reformed faith could have penned his hymns and paraphrases'. In the first summer (1766) of his course at Kinross he was put in charge of a new school at Forestmill, near Clackmannan, where he led a life marred by poverty, disease and loneliness. There he wrote "Lochleven," a poem inspired by the memories of his childhood, which shows the influence of Thomson and confirmed his reputation as a 'local poet and one of the heralds of the later outburst of Scottish song '. He had already been threatened with consumption, and now became seriously ill. During the winter he returned on foot to his father's house, where he wrote his last and finest poem, "Elegy written in Spring" considered among ' the sweetest and most moving compositions in the English language'. He died in 1767, cheerful to the last. A poetical genius James Grant Wilson said of him in 1876, 'cut off in life's green spring'

== Logan Issue ==
As a poet his reputation spread, through sympathy for his early death; and also because of the alleged theft by John Logan of several of his poems. Logan, a fellow-student of Bruce, obtained Bruce's manuscripts from his father, shortly after the poet's death. For the letters, poems, etc., that he allowed to pass out of his hands, Alexander Bruce took no receipt and did not keep any list of the titles. Logan edited in 1770 Poems on Several Occasions, by Michael Bruce, in which the "Ode to the Cuckoo" appeared. In the preface he stated that "to make up a miscellany, some poems written by different authors are inserted." In a collection of his own poems in 1781, Logan printed the "Ode to the Cuckoo" as his own; the friends of Bruce did not challenge its appropriation publicly but Dr Davidson, Professor of Natural & Civil History wrote at the time that he saw a copy of the Ode to the Cuckoo in the possession of a friend, in Bruce's handwriting, and signed by Bruce, with the words 'you think I might have been better employed than writing about a gowk (cuckoo)'. In a manuscript Pious Memorials of Portmoak, drawn up by Bruce's friend, David Pearson, Bruce's authorship of the "Ode to the Cuckoo" is emphatically asserted.

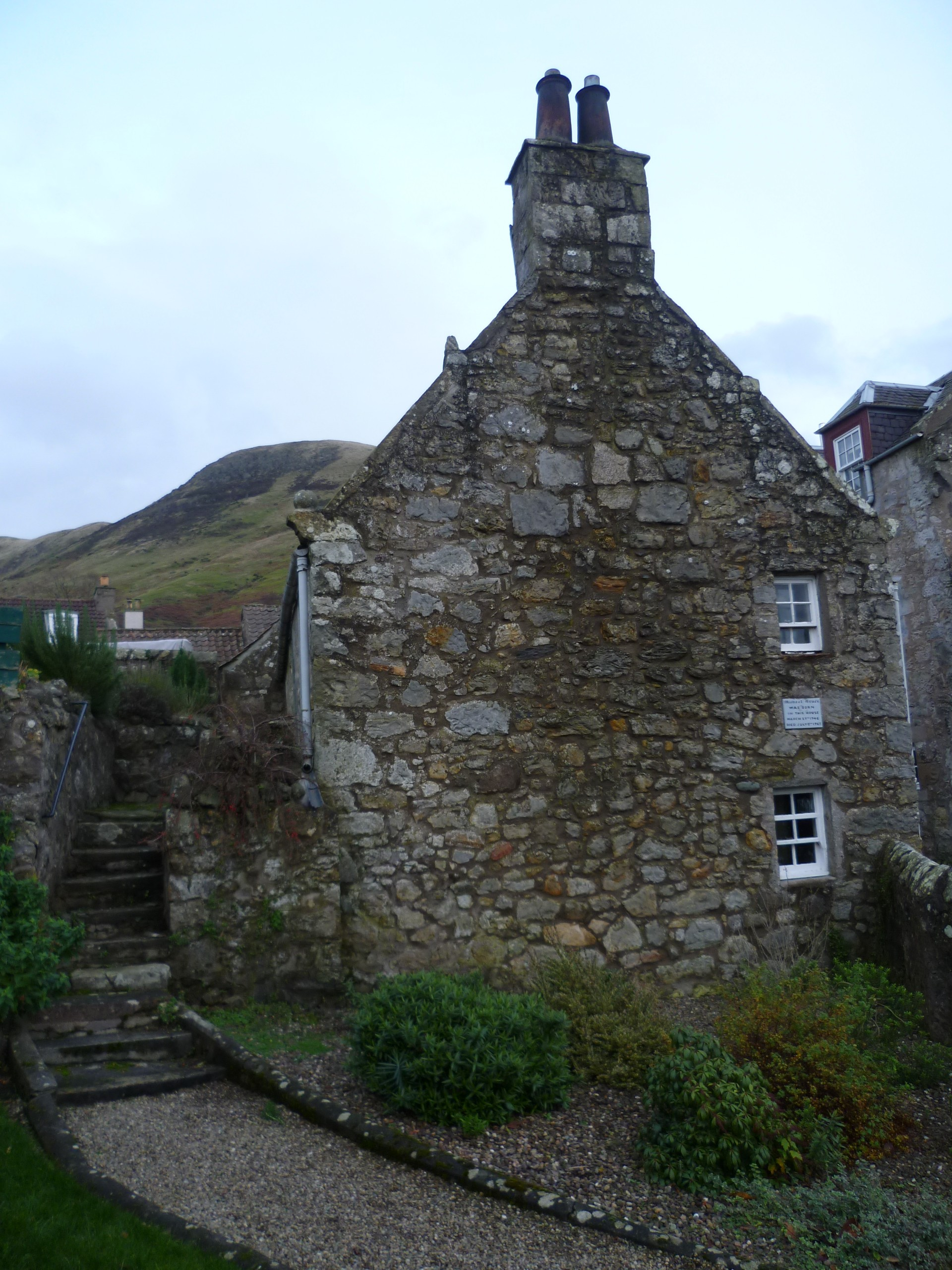
The weaver's cottage is now a museum.

This book was in the possession of the Birrell family, and John Birrell, another friend of the poet, adds a testimony to the same effect. Pearson and Birrell also wrote to Dr Robert Anderson while he was publishing his British Poets, pointing out Bruce's claims. Their communications were used by Anderson in the "Life" prefixed to Logan's works in the British Poets (vol. ii. p. 1029). The volume of 1770 had struck Bruce's friends as being incomplete, and his father missed his son's "Gospel Sonnets," which are supposed by the partisans of Bruce against Logan to have been the hymns printed in the 1781 edition of Logan's poems. Logan tried to prevent by law the reprinting of Bruce's poems (see James Mackenzie's Life of Michael Bruce, 1905, chap. xii.), but the book was printed in 1782, 1784, 1796 and 1807.

Dr William McKelvie revived Bruce's claims in Lochleven and Other Poems, by Michael Bruce, with a Life of the Author from Original Sources (1837). Logan's claim to authorship rests on the publication of the poems under his own name, and his reputation as author during his lifetime. His failure to produce the "poem book" of Bruce entrusted to him, and the fact that no copy of the "Ode to the Cuckoo" in his handwriting was known to exist during Bruce's lifetime, make it difficult to relieve him of the charge of plagiarism. John Veitch, in The Feeling for Nature in Scottish Poetry (1887, vol. ii. pp. 89–91), points out that the stanza known to be Logan's addition to this ode is out of keeping with the rest of the poem, and is in the manner of Logan's established compositions, in which there is nothing to suggest the direct simplicity of the little poem on the cuckoo.

== Bibliography ==
- The Poetical Works of Michael Bruce: With Life and Writings (1895) by Michael Bruce (Author), William Stephen (Editor), Kessinger Publishing (Oct 2009) ISBN 978-1-120-33849-5
- Poems on Several Occasions (1770) Additions thereto were made by Dr McKelvie in his 1837 edition. He gives (p. 97) a list of the poems not printed in Logan's selection, and of those that are lost.
- "Lives" of Bruce and of Logan in Anderson's British Poets (1795); a paper on Bruce in The Mirror (No. 36, 1779), said to be by William Craig, one of the lords of session;
- The Poetical Works of Michael Bruce, with Life and Writings (1895), by William Stephen, who, like Dr AB Grosart in his edition (1865) of The Works of Michael Bruce, adopts McKelvie's view.
- Life of Michael Bruce, Poet of Loch Leven, by James Mackenzie.A restatement of the case for Bruce's authorship, coupled with a rather violent attack on Logan, is to be found in with Vindication of his Authorship of the "Ode to the Cuckoo" and other Poems, also Copies of Letters written by John Logan, first published (1905),
- A Cottage Full of Dreams: The Story of Michael Bruce's Life and Landscape (2017), PPS Publishing. Graphical design by David MacKenzie. A book by the children of Portmoak Primary School, it details the life of Michael Bruce, excerpts of his poetry, art inspired by his work, and descriptions of life in the 18th century.

== Poetry ==
- Elegy to Spring
- Elegy written in Spring
- Ode to a Fountain
- Ode to the Cuckoo
- A Pastoral
- A Pastoral Song
- Danish Ode
- The Works of the Eagle, Crow, and Shepherd
- An Epigram-Celia talking
- Inscription on a Bible
- The Fall of the Table
- Elegy to Spring-as a motto
- The Complaint of Nature
- Anacreontic to a Wasp
- Daphnis-A monody
- Fragments of Satires
- The Lovers (1760)

== Hymns ==
- Three of his hymns were chosen and printed in The Church Hymn book 1872 (n. 1064, 1356 and 1393).
- As Jesus died, and rose again n. 1393 in The Church Hymn book 1872
- Where high the heavenly temple stands n. 1064 i(see external link below )The Church Hymn book 1872 (1765). This hymn is translated into Swedish by Erik Nyström I himlens tempel, högt och stort.
- The hour of my departure's come n. 1356 i The Church Hymn book 1872 (1766)
- O happy is the man who hears The Book of Praise No. 446
- "Behold, the Mountain of the Lord" is Hymn number 54 in "Hymns of the Church of Jesus Christ of Latter-day Saints". (https://www.churchofjesuschrist.org/study/manual/hymns/title-page?lang=eng)

== See also ==
- List of 18th-century British working-class writers
- Scottish literature
