= Benarty Hill =

Hill in Scotland

Benarty
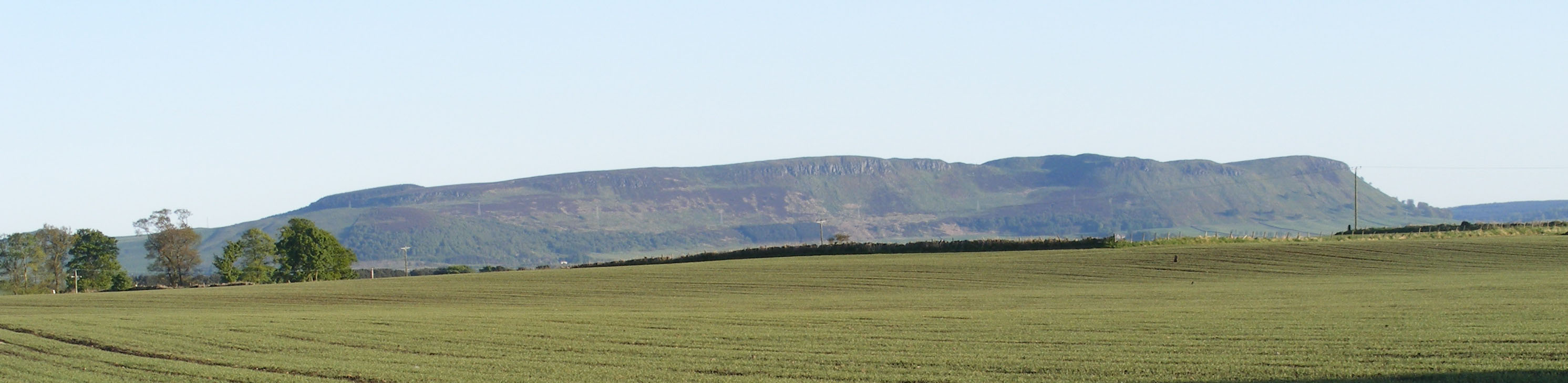
- Benarty Hill from the north

Highest point
- Elevation: 356 m (1,168 ft)
- Prominence: 228 m (748 ft)
- Parent peak: Dumglow
- Listing: Marilyn
- Coordinates: 56°09′57″N 3°21′48″W

Naming
- Native name: Scottish Gaelic: Beinn Artaidh

Geography
- Location within Scotland
- Location: Fife/Perth and Kinross, Scotland
- OS grid: NT153978
- Topo map: OS Landranger 59

Benarty Hill (Scottish Gaelic: Beinn Artaidh, Scots: Benairty), locally simply Benarty, rises above and to the west of Ballingry, in the west of Fife, Scotland. The summit ridge, known as Mulla Craig, forms the boundary with Perth and Kinross. It is a prominent feature of the view from the M90 motorway, and from Kinross and Loch Leven. The lower slopes are steep on all sides, but the extensive heath around the summit is relatively flat. The name Benarty may come from Pictish meaning "stony mountain" (in relation to Mulla Craig) or Gaelic meaning either "mountain where there are bears" or possibly "at the high hill" (this would mean the Gaelic name would be Beinn Àrdaidh).

From the north you can walk over the hill via the Sleeping Giant path accessed from RSPB Loch Leven visitors centre. The summit is easily accessible from its south side, where tracks and paths lead through the forest and up onto the summit heath. There are views across Loch Leven to the Lomond Hills, and across the Firth of Forth to the Lammermuir Hills and Pentland Hills. Distant views to the north and west are dominated by the Southern Highlands; on a clear day the profile of the Isle of Arran may be visible 80 miles to the west.

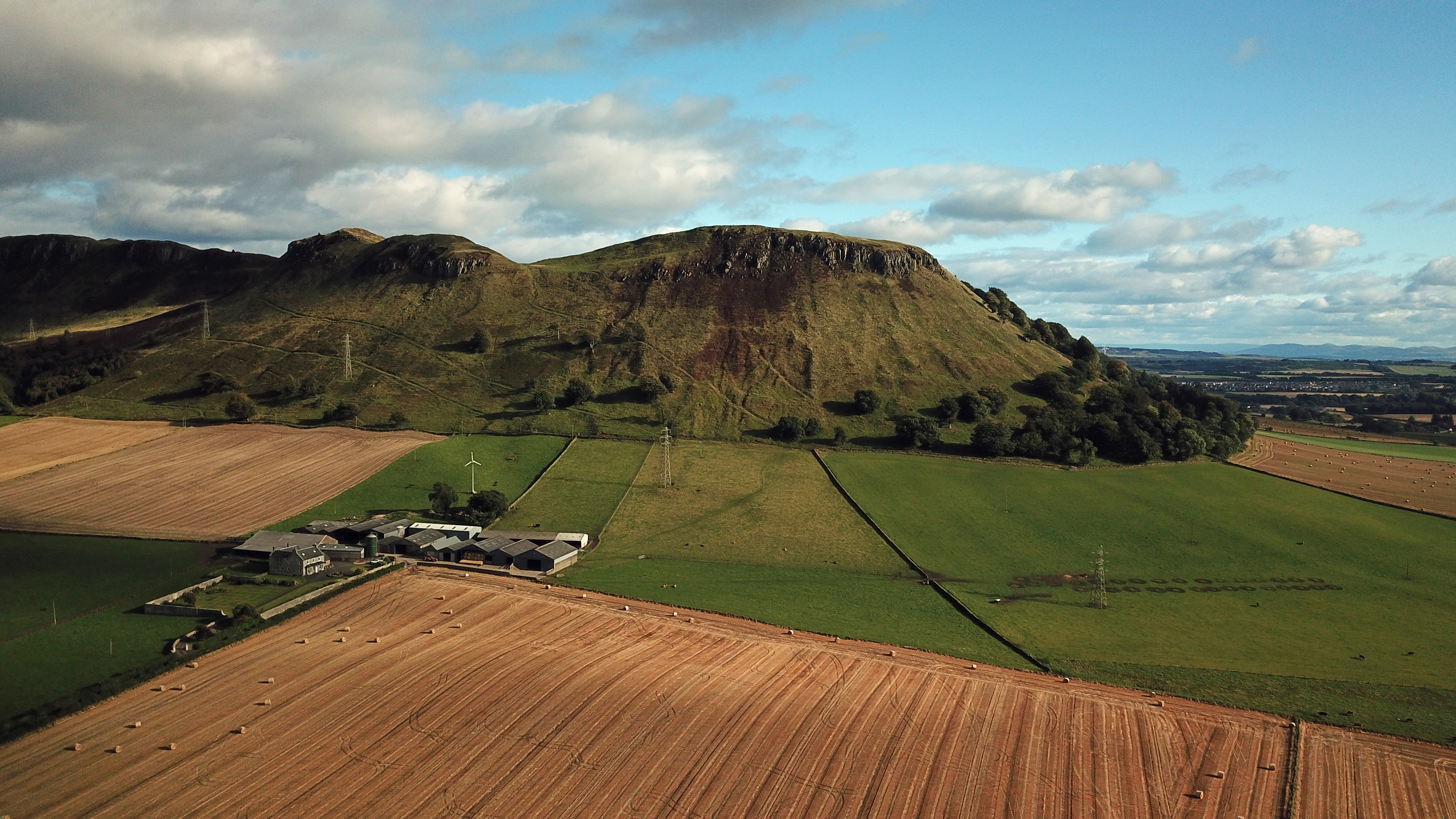
Benarty Hill
