= St Serf's Inch Priory =

Priory in Perth and Kinross, Scotland

Coordinates: 56.1872°N 3.3532°W

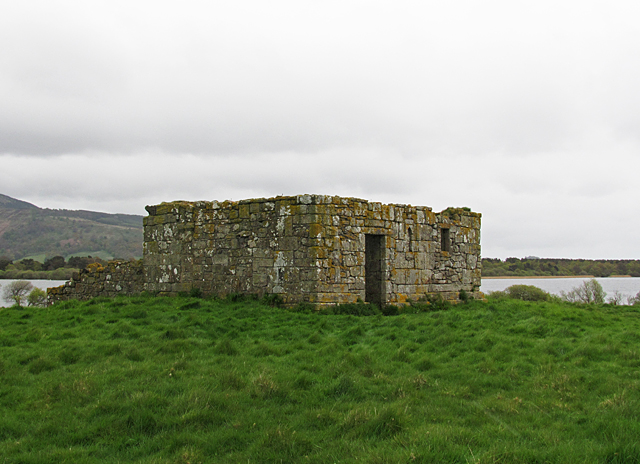
Priory remains on St Serf's Inch

The St Serf's Inch Priory (or Portmoak Priory) was a community of Augustinian canons based, initially at least, on St Serf's Inch in Loch Leven, Perth and Kinross, Scotland.

== Origins ==
It is one of the oldest Christian sites in Scotland; a church was built here dedicated in 838.

It was converted to an Augustinian Priory linked to St Andrews Cathedral Priory at the instigation of King David I of Scotland in 1150. There was a Scottish Céli Dé (or Culdee) establishment there in the first half of the 12th century, allegedly found by Bruide, son of Dargart, King of the Picts (696–706). Presumably it was dedicated to St Serb (Serf or Servanus), and there are indications that the Scottish establishment had a large collection of writings, mostly lost now or translated into Latin. When the Augustinian priory was founded in 1150, the Scottish monks were absorbed into the established and those who refused to join were to be expelled. The most famous prior undoubtedly was the chronicler, Andrew de Wyntoun who probably wrote his Orygynale Cronykil of Scotland on Loch Leven. In the 15th century the priory begins to be referred to as "Portmoak", perhaps indicating that the canons had partially relocated there from the island. Following more than four centuries of Augustinian monastic life and the resignation of the last prior, the Protestant king, James VI of Scotland, granted the priory to St Leonard's College, St Andrews. At some point in time, the structure was converted into a fishing hut or bothy.

== Archaeological Excavations ==
Historic Environment Scotland records that excavations took place in 1877.

In 2011, 2012, and 2017, archaeological excavations at the site revealed the existence of a twelfth-century church, 27’ x 9.25’ with walls 2.5’ thick. An archway was apparent in each end wall. The east archway led to a rectangular chancel, and the west, to a tower or nave. West of the church were the foundations of a large structure, measuring 83’ 2” x 22’ 8”, inside walls that are over 5’ thick. Burials were discovered inside the chancel and to the south and west of the structure. In 2011, the site was determined to have had a series of large concentric oval enclosures centered on the chapel. The largest of these measured 200 x 110 meters and is believed to have been the vallum (wall) or sanctuary of the eighth-century monastery. The remains of roads, light industry, and/or occupation areas inside the monastery are suggested as well. Two excavated trenches yielded sherds of medieval pottery, corroded iron nail, a possible knife blade, fragments of copper-alloy artifacts, a possible ceramic crucible, and a Neolithic tangled flint arrowhead. They also revealed an outer ditch and compacted layers of organic material, suggesting the presence of a fish pond. Small earthworks to the south and east of the priory are thought to have been turf-built cellular buildings and the remnants of corn-drying kilns. Radiocarbon dating indicates that the ditch was created during the twelfth century. The site is protected as a scheduled monument.

== Burials ==
- Patrick Graham (archbishop)

== Bibliography ==
- Cowan, Ian B. & Easson, David E., Medieval Religious Houses: Scotland With an Appendix on the Houses in the Isle of Man, Second Edition, (London, 1976), p. 93
- Watt, D.E.R. & Shead, N.F. (eds.), The Heads of Religious Houses in Scotland from the 12th to the 16th Centuries, The Scottish Records Society, New Series, Volume 24, (Edinburgh, 2001), pp. 139–42

== See also ==
- Prior of Loch Leven
