= Saint Serf =

Scottish saint (c. 500 – c. 583)

Apostle of Orkney
- Born: c. 500
- Died: c. 583
- Venerated in: Eastern Orthodox Church Roman Catholic Church Scottish Episcopal Church
- Feast: 1 July

Saint Serf or Serbán (Servanus) (c. 500 – c. 583) is a saint of Scotland. Serf was venerated in western Fife. He is called the apostle of Orkney, with less historical plausibility. Saint Serf is connected with Saint Mungo's Church near Simonburn, Northumberland (off the Bellingham Road, north of Chollerford). His feast day is 1 July. A St Serfs Church can also be found in the G32 area of Glasgow (Shettleston Road) East end of Glasgow.

== Legends ==
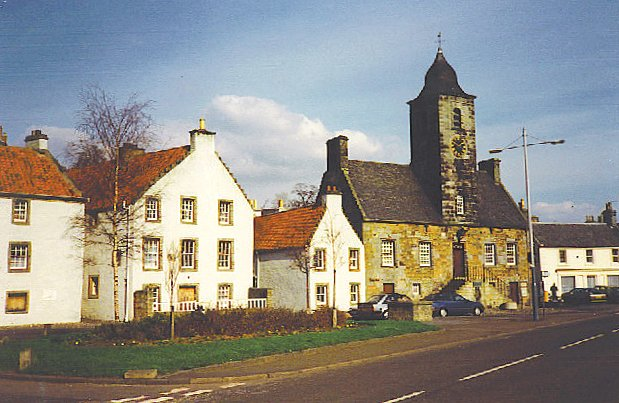
Saint Serf is said to have founded the Scottish town of Culross.

David Hugh Farmer wrote that the legend of Serf is "a farrago of wild impossibilities" stating that Serf was the son of Eliud, King of Canaan, and his wife Alphia, daughter of a King of Arabia. Childless for a long time, they at last had two sons: the second was Serf. Serf came to Rome, carrying with him such a reputation for sanctity that he was elected and served as Pope for seven years.

He travelled to Gaul and Britain after vacating the Holy See, returning to Scotland. There, he met Adomnán, Abbot of Iona, who showed him an island in Loch Leven (later called St Serf's Inch). At the time, this island was part of the Pictish kingdom of Fib (Fife). Serf founded the eponymous St Serf's Inch Priory on the island, where he remained seven years. The priory was a community of Augustinian canons. It was founded from St. Andrews Cathedral Priory at the initiation of King David I of Scotland in 1150. From the 15th century onwards the priory began to be referred to as "Portmoak". After more than four centuries of Augustinian monastic life, the first Protestant king of Scots, James VI of Scotland, granted the priory to St Leonard's College, St Andrews. Today, there are only a small amount of remains left of the priory.

The centre of his ministry (and possibly of his activity) was Culross, which according to tradition, was founded by the saint. At Dunning, in Strathearn, he is said to have slain a dragon with his pastoral staff.

"Finally, after many miracles, after divine virtues, after founding many churches, [Saint Serf], having given his peace to the brethren, yielded up his spirit in his cell at Dunning, on the first day of the Kalends of July; and his disciples and the people of the province take his body to Cuilenross [Culross], and there, with psalms and hymns and canticles, he was honourably buried."

=== Serf and Mungo ===
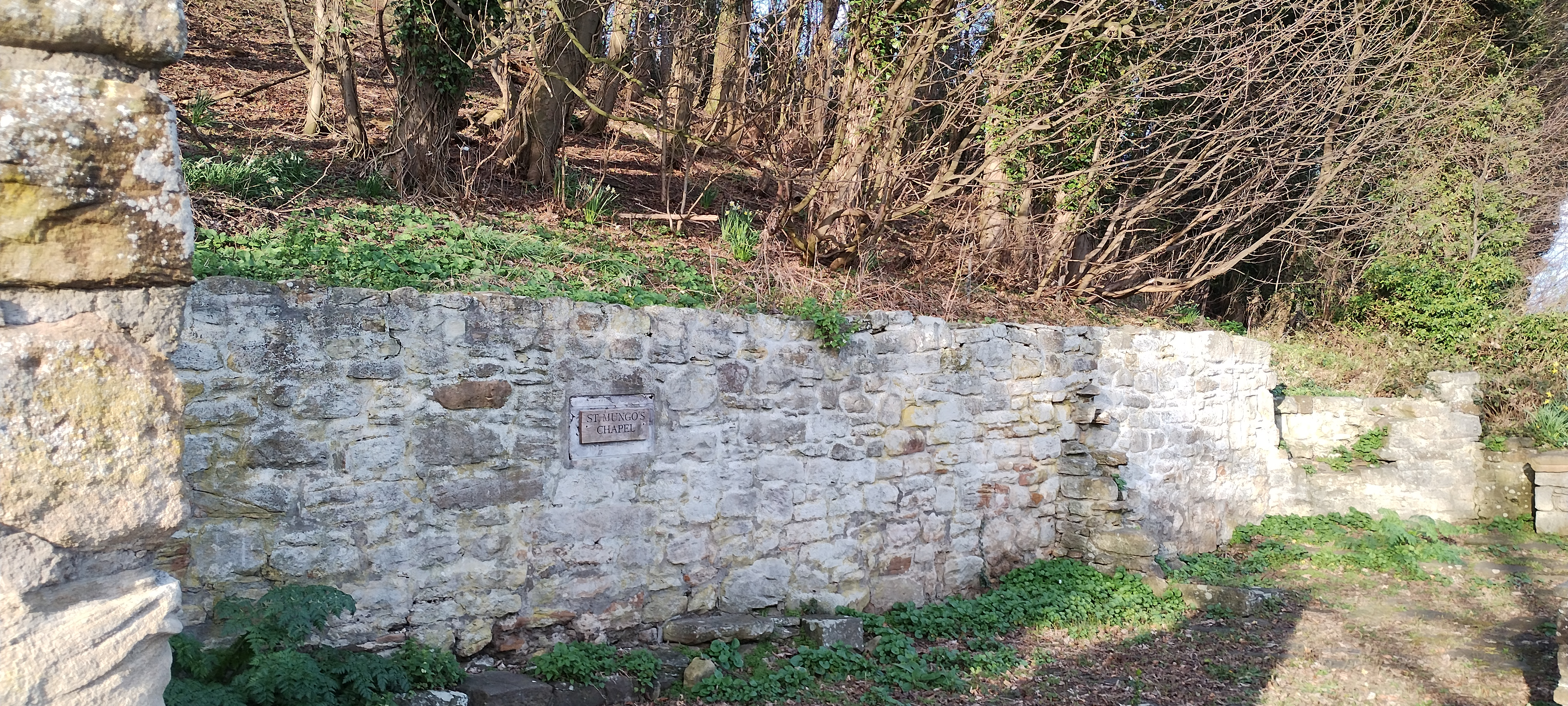
"St Mungo's Chapel" in Culross, also known as "St Serf's Chapel"

Saint Serf is said to have been a contemporary of Saint Mungo, also known as Saint Kentigern, though he could not have lived at the same time as both Adomnán and Mungo.

A legend states that when the British princess (and future saint) Theneva (Thenaw) became pregnant before marriage, her family threw her from a cliff. She survived the fall unharmed, and was soon met by an unmanned boat. She knew she had no home to go to, so she boarded the boat; it sailed her across the Firth of Forth to land at Culross where she was cared for by Saint Serf; he became foster-father of her son, Saint Kentigern (Saint Mungo).

Another legend states that Mungo restored a pet robin of Serf's to life. The bird had been killed by some of his classmates who had planned to blame him for its death.

== Churches ==
Saint Serf is a relatively common dedication for churches in Fife, Edinburgh and Central Scotland.

The name also attaches to schools in the area.
