= John Laird (philosopher) =

British philosopher (1887–1946)

John Laird (17 May 1887 – 5 August 1946) was a British philosopher, in the school of New British Realism, who later turned to metaphysical idealism.

== Life ==
Laird was born at Durris, Kincardineshire, a parish adjacent to the birthplace of Scottish philosopher Thomas Reid. He was the son of Margaret Laird (née Steward) and D. M. W. Laird, a Church of Scotland minister, and the son of John Laird, a minister and Free Church moderator.

He attended Aberdeen Grammar School and the University of Edinburgh, where in 1908 he graduated with a first class MA in philosophy. He spent a brief time at Heidelberg before entering Trinity College, Cambridge as a Scholar. He graduated from Cambridge with a first class BA in both parts of the Moral sciences tripos, and graduated with an MA in 1920. He was an Assistant Lecturer at the University of St Andrews in 1911. In 1912, he took up a Professorship of Philosophy at Dalhousie University, Halifax, Nova Scotia. The following year he returned to the United Kingdom as Professor of Logic and Metaphysics at Queen's University Belfast (1913–24). In 1924 he was appointed as Regius Professor of Moral Philosophy at the University of Aberdeen, a position which he held until his death. He was Mills Lecturer, University of California from 1923 to 1924 and Gifford Lecturer, at the University of Glasgow from 1939 to 1940.

In 1913, he met Helen Ritchie. They married in 1919 and had one son, who died in childhood. After the move to Aberdeen the Lairds lived in Powis Lodge, Old Aberdeen.

Laird was president of the Aristotelian Society from 1929 to 1930.

He was a prolific writer and public speaker.

== Works ==
His books included:

- Problems of the Self (1917)
- A Study in Realism (1920)
- The Idea of the Soul (1924)
- Our Minds and Their Bodies (1925)
- A Study in Moral Theory (1926)
- Modern Problems in Philosophy (1928)
- The Idea of Value (1929)
- Knowledge, Belief, and Opinion (1930)
- Morals and Western Religion (1931)
- Hume's Philosophy of Human Nature (1932)
- Hobbes (1934)
- An Enquiry into Moral Notions (1935)
- Recent Philosophy (1936)
- S. Alexander's Philosophical and Literary Pieces (1939)
- Theism and Cosmology (1940) Gifford Lectures 1938–1939
- Mind and Deity (1941)Gifford Lectures 1939–1940
- The Device of Government (1944)
- On Human Freedom (1947)

== External sources ==
- Who Was Who, 1941–1950, London : A. & C. Black, p. 653
- "Laird, John" . Thom's Irish Who's Who . Dublin: Alexander Thom and Son Ltd. 1923. p. 130 – via Wikisource.

== See also ==
- Works by or about John Laird at the Internet Archive
