= West Lomond =

Hill in Fife, Scotland

Coordinates: 56.24511°N 3.29733°W

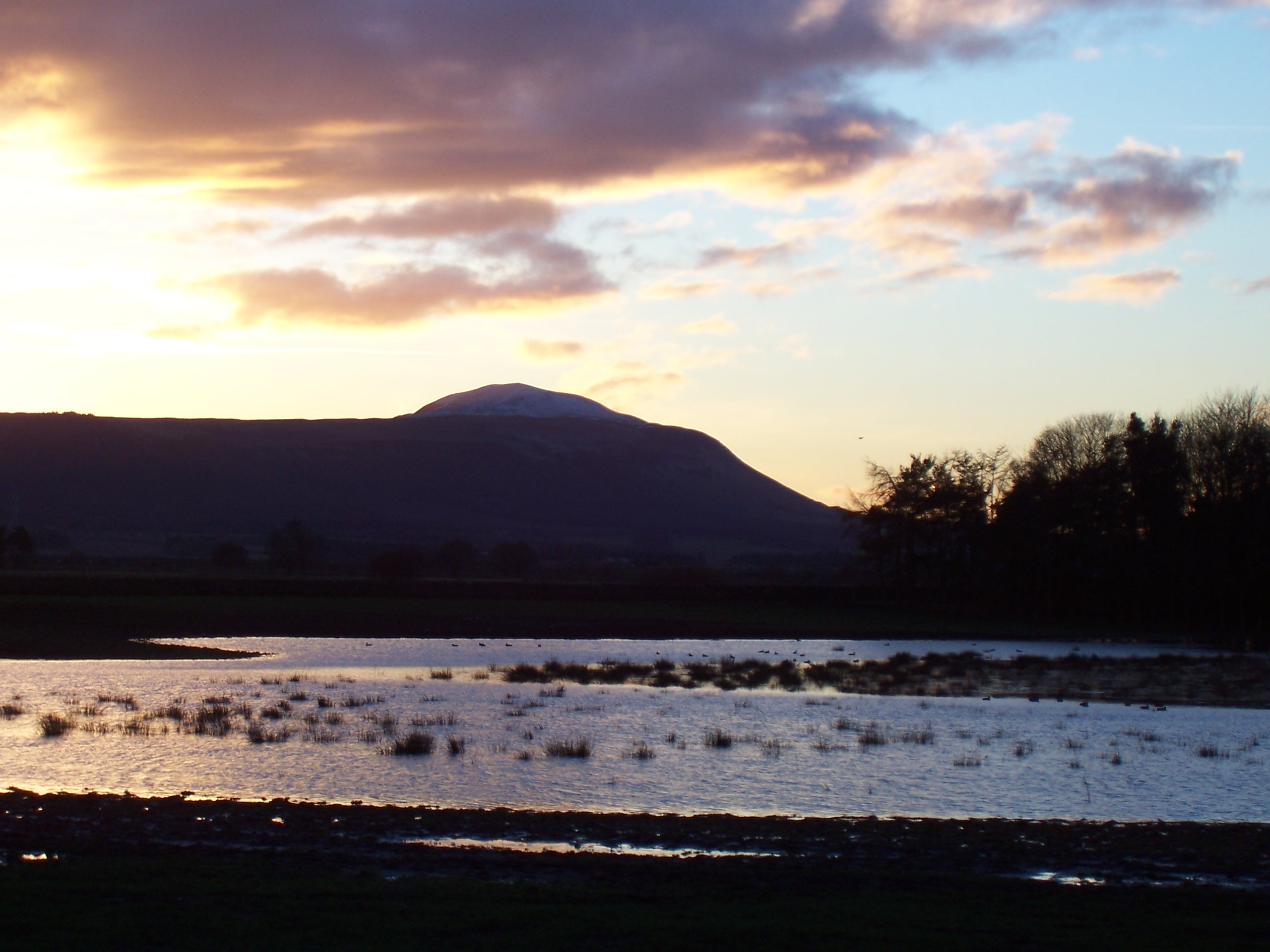
- West Lomond from the Howe of Fife at sunset

Highest point
- Elevation: 522 m (1,713 ft)
- Prominence: 405 m (1,329 ft)
- Parent peak: Ben Cleuch
- Listing: Marilyn

Geography
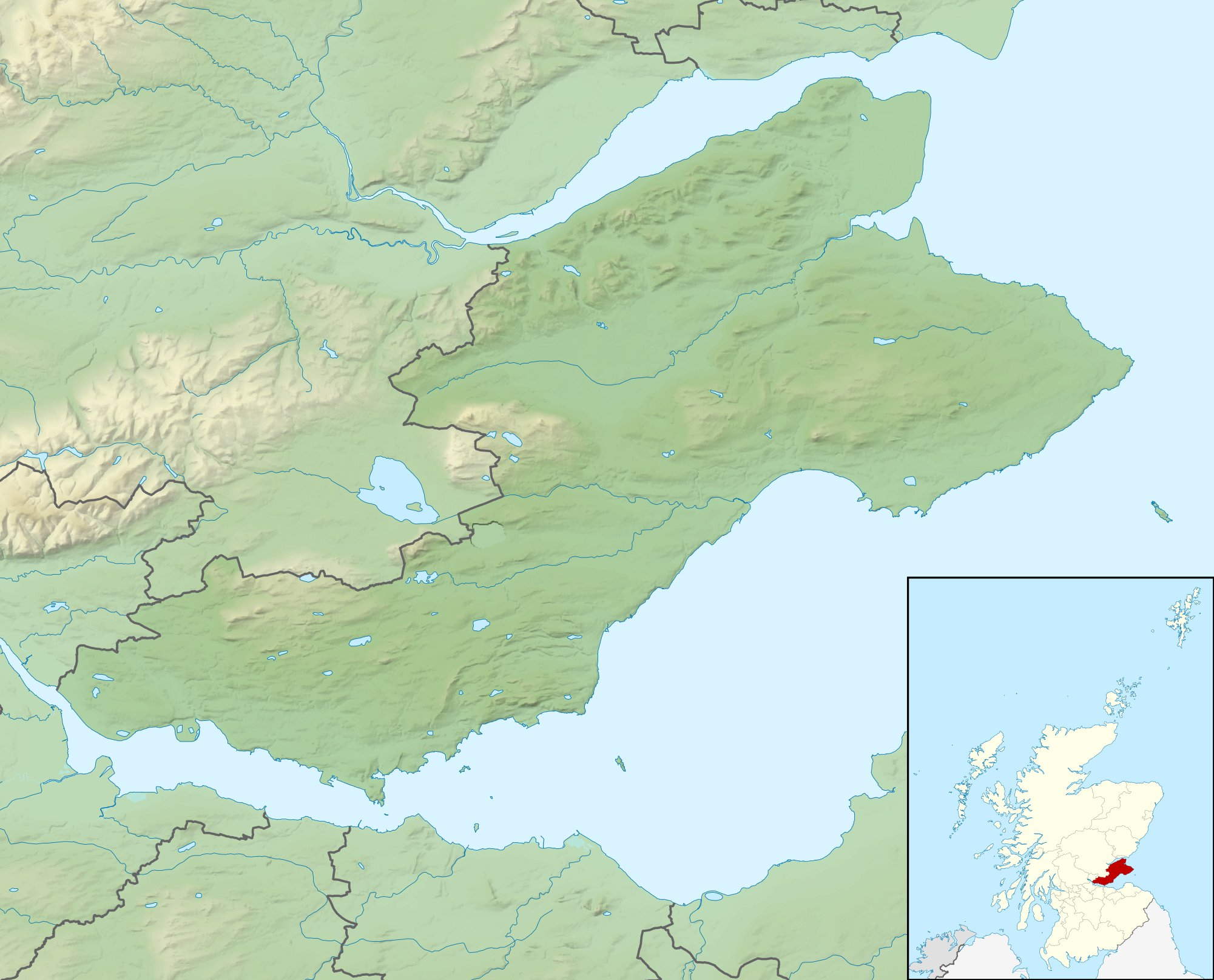
- Location within Fife Location within Scotland
- Location: Fife, Scotland
- Parent range: Lomond Hills
- OS grid: NO197066
- Topo map: OS Landranger 58

West Lomond is the highest point in the county of Fife, Scotland and the highest peak in the Lomond Hills. Its cone-shaped summit, which is the remains of a volcanic plug, rises above an escarpment of Carboniferous sandstone and limestone layers, capped with a quartz-microgabbro sill. The conspicuous peaks of West Lomond, and its neighbour East Lomond, are visible for many miles around, which explains one suggested origin of their name, the 'Lomond' or 'beacon' hills. On the summit are the remains of an Iron Age hill fort.

West Lomond is usually climbed from Craigmead car park on the Falkland-Leslie road which is at a height of almost 300 metres. Another route of ascent leaves from the Bunnet Stane and climbs diagonally up the steep north slopes of the escarpment to a gap in the cliffs, gaining the plateau a short distance from the summit cone. This route is steeper and begins at a much lower altitude than the Craigmead car park.

== Geodesy ==
Until 1891 West Lomond was the meridian of the 6 inch and 1:2500 Ordnance Survey maps of Kinross and Fife. After that the maps of Kinross and Fife were drawn according to the meridian of The Buck in Aberdeenshire.
