= Bunnet Stane =

Rock formation in Fife, Scotland

Coordinates: 56.24919°N 3.30903°W

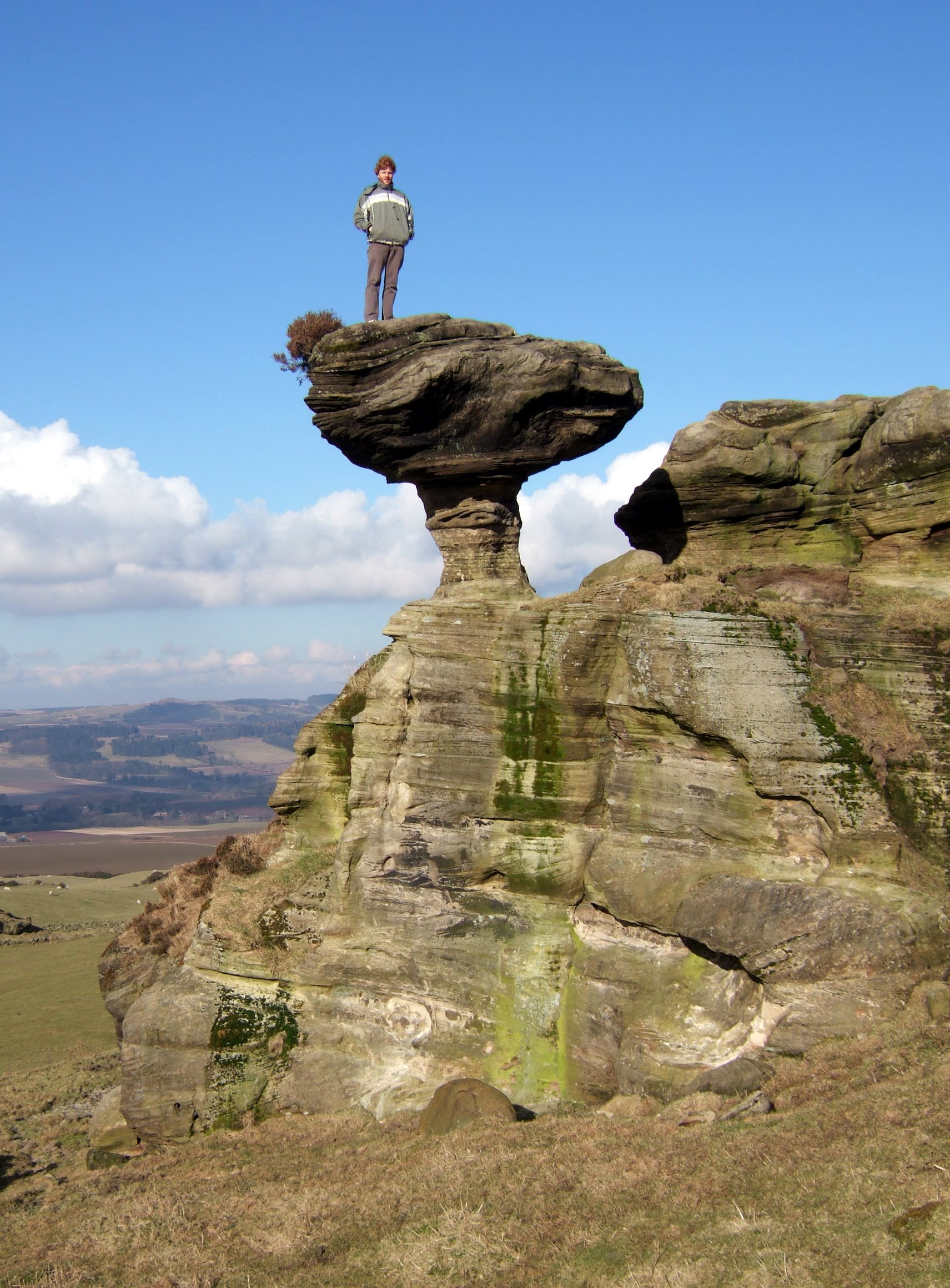
The Bunnet Stane.

The Bunnet Stane (or bonnet stone) is a rock formation near the hamlet of Gateside in Fife, at the foot of West Lomond. It sits upon one of the calciferous sandstone outcrops of the Old Red Sandstone suie that exist around the base of the Lomond Hills. The Bunnet Stane itself consists of an elevated table of rock, about ten feet by twenty feet across, which sits upon a thin column of rock like a giant mushroom. There are several romantic explanations for the stone's shape, but it was formed entirely by the natural weathering of the exposed outcrop.

== Maiden's Bower ==
There is a small man-made cave carved into the outcrop beneath the Bunnet Stane called Maiden's Bower. Originally termed Maiden-bore, the term was also applied to the rock formation as a whole, including the Bunnet Stane atop. The story goes that many years ago a young maiden fell in love with the son of a rival family. The stone was their meeting spot but one day, as she approached, she saw her father's men ambush and kill the young man. After that she refused to return home and spent the remainder of her life in the cave, becoming known locally as a saint. More realistic theories suggest that the cave may have been built by a landlord as a bothy or by surveyors in the 19th century. A further explanation was provided by a contributor to the Scots Magazine, a few years ago. This person was an elderly lady who, as a child, spent holiday time at the nearby farm of Wester Nether Urquhart. In her letter, she described an old man (possibly an ex-soldier) who was given permission by the farmer to make himself a small bothy which he occupied while employed as a shepherd. An examination of the interior shows the remains of an iron fire grate and ventilation chimney. The walls bear grooves, notches and small platforms which are likely to have served the purpose of partitioning off, say, a sleeping area or storage. One largeish notch in the southern wall may have supported one end of a sleeping platform.

== Location ==
The Bunnet Stane is not marked on the 1:50 000 OS map. Its coordinates are: Landranger 58 GR 189 071. A path leads to the Bunnet Stane from an unmarked car park at GR 185 082 on the same map. Both the Bunnet Stane and the car park are marked on the 1:25 000 OS Explorer map (No.370 - Glenrothes North, Falkland & Lomond Hills).
