= St Serf's Inch =

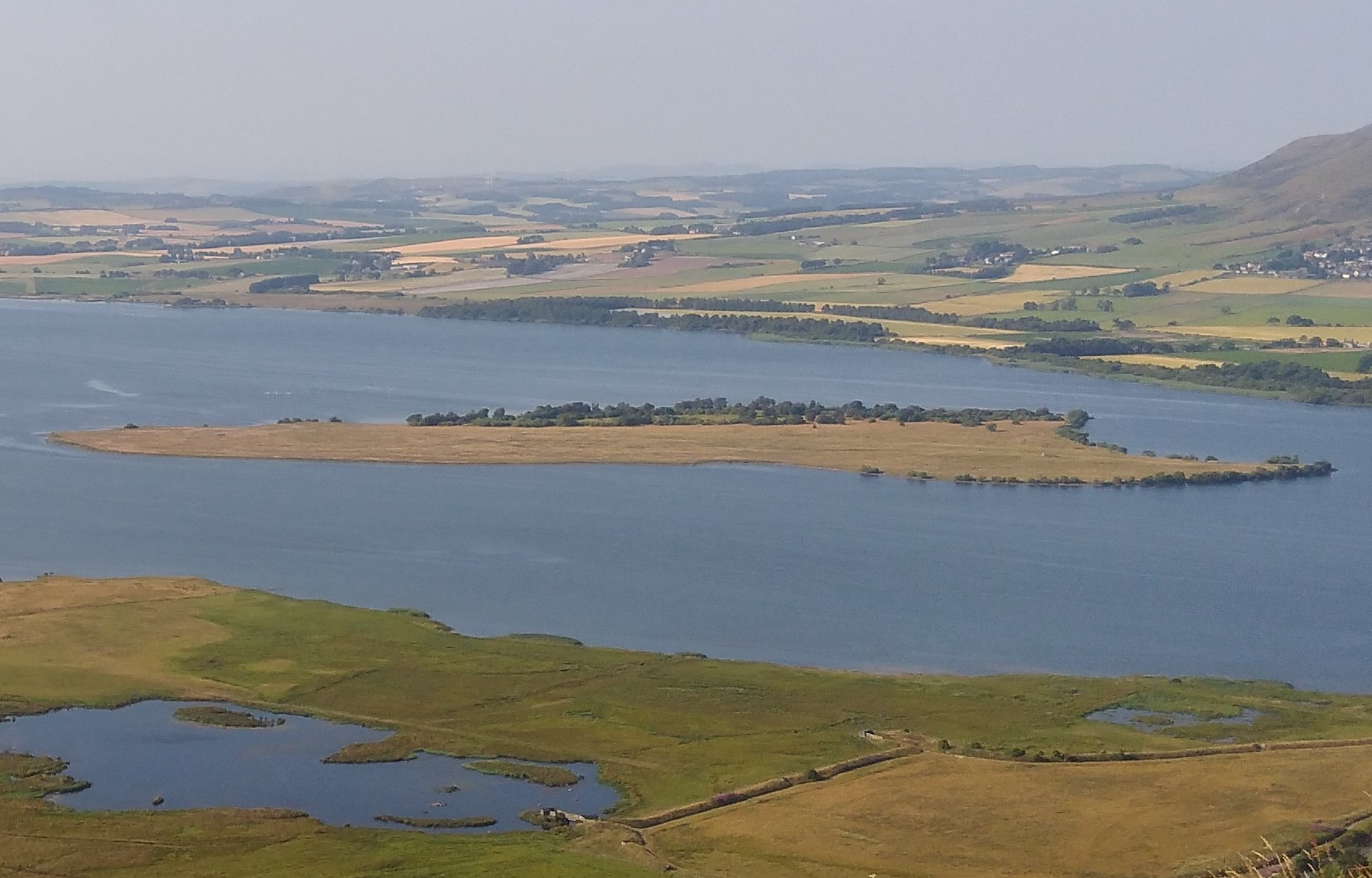
- St Serf's Inch and Loch Leven, from Benarty Hill

Location
- St Serf's Inch shown within Perth and Kinross
- OS grid reference: NO161003
- Coordinates: 56.19°N 3.35°W

Physical geography
- Island group: Loch Leven
- Area: 31 ha
- Area rank: (Freshwater: 12)
- Highest elevation: 114 m (374 ft)

Administration
- Council area: Perth and Kinross
- Country: Scotland
- Sovereign state: United Kingdom

Demographics
- Population: 0

St Serf's Inch or St Serf's Island is an island in Loch Leven, in south-eastern Perth and Kinross, Scotland. It was the home of a Culdee and then an Augustinian monastic community, St Serf's Inch Priory.

== History ==
There was a monastic community on the island which was old in the 12th century. The monastery produced a series of Gaelic language charters from the 11th and 12th centuries which were translated into Latin in the late 12th century. It is from these that we know Macbeth, the King of Scots and his consort Gruoch, made an endowment of land to the priory. One of these charters purports to go back to Brude filius Dergard, that is Bruide mac Dargarto, King of the Picts (d. 706). Other of these charters record grants from Máel Dúin, Bishop of St Andrews (d. 1055), his successor Túathal (d. c. 1060), his successor Fothad mac Maíl Míchéil, King Máel Coluim III (1058–1093) and his wife Margaret, Ethelred, abbot of Dunkeld, and King Domnall Bán (1093–1097). Also among the collection of these translations is a record of a trial held c. 1128 and presided over by Causantín, Mormaer of Fife and magnum judex in Scotia, assisted by Dufgal filium Mocche and Meildoineneth filium Machedath; the trial pertained to the behaviour of one Robert "the Burgundian", the earliest recorded French settler north of the Forth, towards the monks of St Serf, and resulted in favour of the monks after Causantín bowed to the "superior knowledge" of the law held by "Dufgal".

Prior Andrew of Wyntoun, author of the 15th century historical work called Oryginalle Cronykil of Scotland included various unflattering stories about his monarch. Macbeth was described as a 'changeling' or 'Devil's child'. Andrew also recorded a number of tales that were referenced in William Shakespeare's 'Scottish Play', including a prophecy that Macbeth would never be killed by a man born of woman, his recognition by three 'Weird Sisters', and that his demise would only come when the wood of Birnam came to Dunsinane.

== See also ==
- List of islands of Scotland
- Prior of Loch Leven
- St Serf's Inch Priory
