= David Macpherson (historian) =

Scottish historian

David Macpherson (26 October 1746 – 1 August 1816) was a Scottish historian.

== Life ==
The son of a tailor and clothier, Macpherson was born in Edinburgh, 26 October 1746. He was probably educated at Edinburgh High School and the University of Edinburgh and then trained as a land surveyor. Working in the UK and America, he was able to earn some money before 1790, about which time he settled with his wife and family in London making his living as a man of letters.

Losing money through bad loans, Macpherson was occasionally in straitened circumstance from then on, but continued to write, encouraged by antiquarians such as Joseph Ritson and George Chalmers. He died in London, 1 August 1816.

== Works ==
For some time Macpherson was a deputy-keeper of the public records, and assisted in preparing for publication the first and part of the second volume of the Rotuli Scotiæ. He edited Andrew Wyntoun's Orygynal Cronykil of Scotland, 2 vols., 1795; it was re-edited, in an enlarged form, by David Laing, for the Historians of Scotland series, 1879. Macpherson's other works were:

- Geographical Illustrations of Scottish History, 1796.
- Annals of Commerce, Fisheries, and Navigation ... from the earliest Accounts to the Meeting of the Union Parliament in 1801 (with the essentials of Adam Anderson's History of Commerce), 4 vols. 1805.
- The History of European Commerce with India, 1812.

== Notes ==
Attribution

This article incorporates text from a publication now in the public domain: Bayne, Thomas Wilson (1893). "Macpherson, David". In Lee, Sidney (ed.). Dictionary of National Biography. Vol. 35. London: Smith, Elder & Co.
