= Howe of Fife =

Valley of the River Eden

Coordinates: 56.29°N 3.12°W

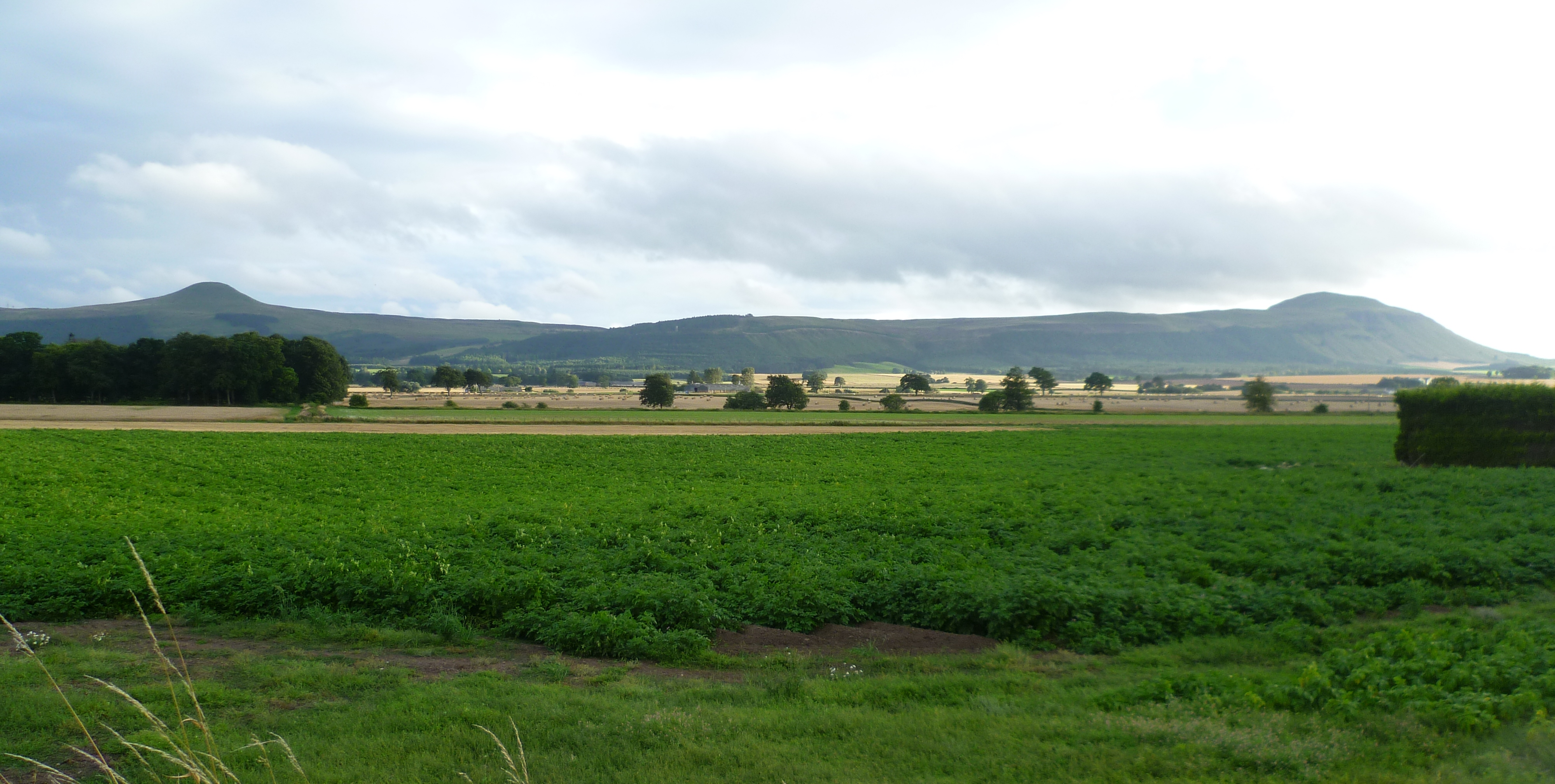
The Lomonds seen from Auchtermuchty in the Howe of Fife

The Howe of Fife (Scottish Gaelic: Srath Aodann) is the broad, low-lying valley of the River Eden, lying between the Ochil Hills and the Lomond Hills in Fife, Scotland. Howe, in Scots means a hollow or a plain bounded by hills. The alternative terms Laich of Fife and the Valley of Eden have fallen from use, as has Stratheden, save for the hospital near Cupar.

Cupar-based Howe of Fife RFC take their name from the area.
