= Prior of Loch Leven =

The Prior of Loch Leven was the head of lands and of the community Augustinian canons of St Serf's Inch Priory, Loch Leven (a.k.a. Portmoak Priory). There was a Scottish Céli Dé (or Culdee) establishment there in the first half of the 12th century, allegedly found by Bruide, son of Dargart, King of the Picts (696–706). When the Augustinian priory was founded in 1150, the Scottish monks were absorbed into the established and those who refused to join were to be expelled. Not all of the priors are known. The most famous prior undoubtedly was the chronicler, Andrew de Wyntoun. Following more than four centuries of Augustinian monastic life and the resignation of the last prior, the Protestant king, James VI of Scotland, granted the priory to St Leonard's College, St Andrews.

== Known abbots and priors ==
=== List of known Scottish abbots of St Serf's Inch ===
- Ronán, fl. mid-10th century
- Eógan, fl. 1128

=== List of known Augustinian priors of Loch Leven ===
- Roger, fl. 1183 x 1203-1212 x
- Simon, c. 1225-x 1235
- G. [...?], fl. 1235
- Laurence, fl. 1268
- Robert de Montrose, fl. 1386 x 1387
- David Bell, 1387–1390
- Thomas Mason, 1388–1389
- Andrew de Wyntoun, 1390–1421
  - James Biset, 1391–1394
- John Cameron, 1421
- Andrew Newton, 1423
- Robert Horsbruk, 1440–1460
- David Ramsay, 1462 x 1466
- Walter Monypenny, 1465–1500
- John Wylie, 1465
- Alexander Scrimgeour, 1483
- Thomas Kynor [Kinnear], 1486
- David Dickson, 1524–1525
- Michael Donaldson, 1524–1525
- John Winram, 1534
- David Guthrie, 1544–1558
- John Winram, 1552–1582

== See also ==
- St Serf's Inch Priory
