= Dumglow =

Hillfort in Perth and Kinross, Scotland

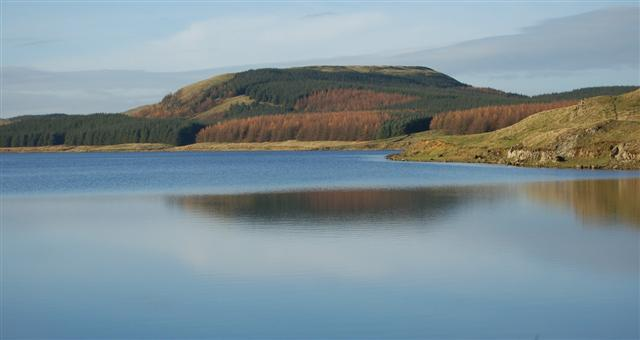
- Dumglow from the shore of Loch Glow

Highest point
- Elevation: 379 m (1,243 ft)
- Prominence: 251 m (823 ft)
- Listing: Marilyn,
- Coordinates: 56°09′09″N 3°29′20″W

Geography
- Location: Perth and Kinross, Scotland
- Parent range: Cleish Hills
- OS grid: NT076965
- Topo map: OS Landranger 58

Dumglow (379 m) is the highest peak of the Cleish Hills in Perth and Kinross, Scotland. It is located north of Dunfermline.

An ancient fort lies on its summit, fortified by several sets of ramparts and ditches on its east side. A burial cairn is situated within the remains of the fort.
