= Andrew of Wyntoun =

Scottish poet, prior of Loch Leven, and a canon

Andrew Wyntoun, known as Andrew of Wyntoun (c. 1350 – c. 1425), was a Scottish poet, a canon and prior of Loch Leven on St Serf's Inch and, later, a canon of St. Andrews.

Andrew Wyntoun is most famous for his completion of an eight-syllabled metre entitled, Orygynale Cronykil of Scotland, which contains an early mention of Robin Hood; it is also cited by the Oxford English Dictionary as the earliest work in English to use the word "Catholic": [spelling modernised] "He was a constant Catholic;/All Lollard he hated and heretic." Wyntoun wrote the 'Chronicle' at the request of his patron, Sir John of Wemyss, whose representative, Mr. Erskine Wemyss of Wemyss Castle, Fife, possessed the oldest extant manuscript of the work. The subject of the 'Chronicle' is the history of Scotland from the mythical period to the death of Robert Stewart, Duke of Albany in 1420.

The nine original manuscripts of the Orygynale Cronykil of Scotland still subsist today and are preserved within various facilities throughout the United Kingdom. Three out of the eight original manuscripts are currently preserved by the British Library, two are in the possession of the Advocates' Library in Edinburgh; one, within the University of St Andrews Library; another, within the confines of Wemyss Castle and the eighth, privately owned by Mister John Ferguson of Duns, Scottish Borders, Berwickshire. The first edition of the 'Chronicle' (based on the Royal manuscript) was published by David Macpherson in 1795; the second edition was produced by David Laing and published in 1872 and the current standard edition was published by F. J. Amours as The Original Chronicle of Andrew of Wyntoun: Printed on Parallel Pages from the Cottonian and Wemyss MSS., with the Variants of the Other Texts.

The Chronicle is entirely composed of couplets, usually of eight syllables, although frequently there also are lines of six or 10 syllables.

Religious titles
Preceded by David Bell or Thomas Mason	Prior of Loch Leven; 1390–1421	Succeeded by John Cameron
