= Orygynale Cronykil of Scotland =

History of Scotland by Andrew of Wyntourn

The Orygynale Cronykil of Scotland ("Original Chronicle of Scotland") is a history of Scotland from the beginning of the world until the accession of King James I. Attributed to Andrew of Wyntoun, a learned scholar of the time, it is one of the only manuscripts composed in Scots verse before the seventeenth century, though it is also said to be written in northern English. Wyntoun himself calls his language "Ynglys".

The Cronykil survives in eleven manuscripts, such as those in the Cotton library, the Harleian library, and the library of the faculty of Advocates at Edinburgh. The purest is the Royal MS, Brit. Museum. There is speculation over the date of the Royal manuscript, but scholars have determined that it likely could not have been written prior to 1420. (Wyntoun was born around 1350.) Andrew of Wyntoun and John of Fordun were contemporary historians, and though they did not know of each other, they share a claim to the title of original historian of Scotland..

Wyntoun wrote in eight syllable verse and couplets to form a primitive poetry. Composed of 30,000 verses, the Cronykil is divided into nine books, and each book is divided into chapters. The first five books focus on the creation of the world in general, and Scottish history commences in the sixth. The eighth book is longer than the first four combined. Wyntoun received the last eighty-three years of the history, covering King David II to Robert II, from an acquaintance.

Among other topics, Wyntoun records the churches and Bishops of St. Andrew, as well as information about the royal families of Scotland, lines from Barbour and an elegiac cantus for Alexander III. However, he skims over Alexander the Great and the wars of the Anglo-Saxons with the Ancient Britons, merely directing readers to find such histories in other books. Most notably, the Cronykil contains the original story of Macbeth and the witches (in Book Six). Wyntoun provided a second, revised Cronykil, correcting minor mistakes made in the first edition.
