= Loch Leven (Kinross) =

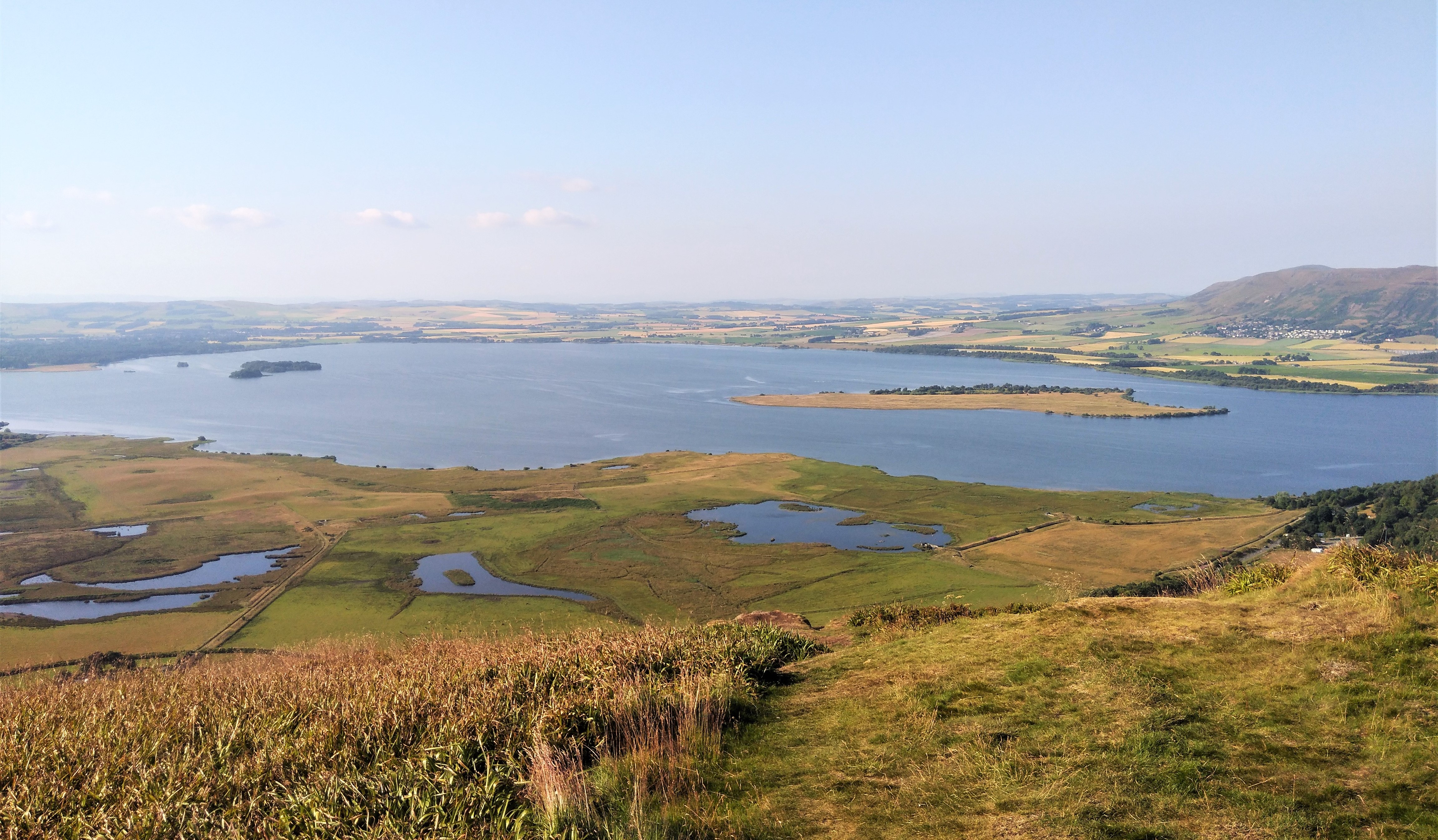
- Looking north from Benarty Hill

- Location within Perth and Kinross Location within Scotland
- Coordinates: 56.20019°N 3.37963°W
- Type: freshwater loch
- Max. length: 5.24 km (3 mi 1,352 ft)
- Max. width: 4.18 km (2 mi 3,154 ft)
- Surface area: 1,611 ha (3,980 acres)
- Average depth: 4.6 m (15 ft)
- Max. depth: 13 m (44 ft)
- Shore length^{1}: 23 km (14 mi)
- Surface elevation: 106 m (348 ft)
- Islands: Lochleven Castle, St Serf's Island, Reed Bower, Alice's Bower, Scart Island, Roy's Folly, Green Isle
- ^{1} Shore length is not a well-defined measure.

Loch Leven (Scottish Gaelic: Loch Lìobhann) is a fresh water loch located immediately to the east of the burgh of Kinross in Perth and Kinross council area, central Scotland. Roughly triangular, the loch is about six kilometres (3 1/2 miles) across at its longest. Prior to the canalisation of the River Leven, and the partial draining of the loch in 1826–36, Loch Leven was considerably larger. The drop in water level by 1.4 m (4 ft 7 in) reduced the loch to 75% of its former size, and exposed several small islands, as well as greatly increasing the size of the existing ones.

There are seven islands on the loch, the largest being St Serf's Inch. Lochleven Castle, where Mary, Queen of Scots was imprisoned in 1567, lies on one of these islands, and it can be reached by a ferry operated from Kinross by Historic Environment Scotland during the summer months.

NatureScot describe Loch Leven as "one of Scotland's top natural assets", due to its rich ecosystem that supports many different species of plants, insects, fish and birds. It is of particular significance to migrating birds, who use it as a stopover when flying between their breeding and wintering grounds, due to its lowland location, shallow nutrient rich waters, large water surface, and islands (which provide safe nesting sites). Loch Leven holds numerous national and international conservation designations, including being a national nature reserve (NNR).

== Flora and fauna ==
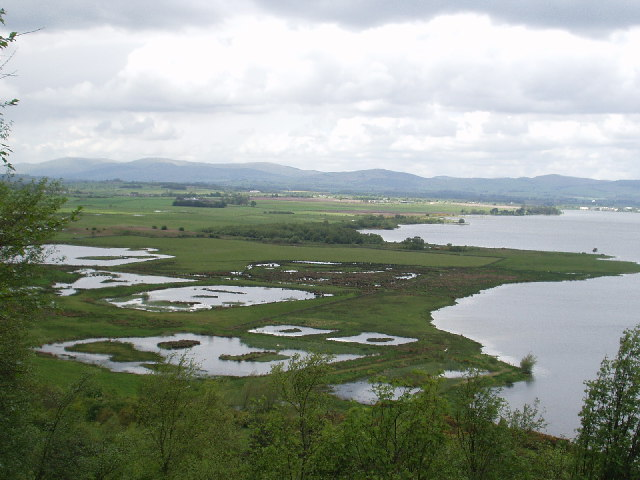
Wetland habitat on the RSPB reserve

As the largest lowland loch in Scotland, Loch Leven is an important site for waterfowl, with up to 35,000 birds present in the winter months. These birds migrate from a variety of places, such as Greenland, Iceland, Ireland, Siberia and northern and central Europe. Loch Leven is particularly important for pink-footed geese, and up to 20,000 such geese (nearly 10% of the world's population) may be present at times, although many geese move south from the loch as winter progresses. Other bird wintering at Loch Leven include greylag geese, whooper swans, goldeneyes, tufted ducks, pochards, teals, gadwalls, cormorants, and shovelers.

Loch Leven is also important for breeding birds, and hosts one of the largest concentrations of breeding ducks of any non-coastal site in Europe. The most numerous species are tufted duck and mallard; gadwall, shoveler, shelduck, pochard, teal, pintail and wigeon are also present. The loch is also used by birds such as mute swans at the end of the summer for moulting, as the loch is large enough to allow them to avoid predators during a period when they are flightless as the shed their summer feathers and grow new winter plumage.

The two main fish species present in Loch Leven are brown trout and perch: the loch's trout have long been noted for their unusual colour and high quality. Other fish living in the loch include sticklebacks, pike, eels, and minnows. Some species of fish noted in historical records are no longer present: it is thought that Arctic char were impacted by the lowering of the loch's water level, whilst the damming of the River Leven and rise in pollution due to the increase in industry are the likely reasons for the demise of the population of Atlantic salmon.

The loch supports many species of invertebrates, which provide a food source for many of the species of birds, fish and mammals. During the summer months large clouds of small flies form a vital part of the food for ducklings. Some rare species of beetle are present, including the carrion beetle Thanatophilus dispar, the reed beetle Macroplea appendiculata and the ant beetle Anthicus scoticus. Other invertebrates found at the loch include aquatic snails and several species of dragonflies and damselflies.

Otters are found around the loch and the burns that feed into it, and water shrews and water voles live along the banks of ditches and burns. A total of six species of bat have been recorded at the NNR: Daubenton, brown long-eared, noctule, Nathusius, soprano and common pipistrelle bat. Grey squirrel numbers are controlled and this has allowed red squirrels to re-establish themselves in woodlands around the loch. Red fox, American mink and brown rat are also present on the reserve. As with the grey squirrels numbers are controlled, for these pest species this is to protect nesting birds.

The Loch Leven NNR hosts a wide assemblage of vascular plant species that grow around the loch shore, including three species listed on the IUCN Red List (coral root orchid, Loch Leven spearwort and lesser water-plantain) and other species rated as "nationally rare" or "nationally scarce" such as holy grass, threadrush and mudwort. Lesser water plantain, Loch Leven spearwort, mudwort and threadrush live on areas of mud, sand or gravel around the lochside. They require sites that are intermittently exposed, and either natural erosion or active management is needed to prevent reeds or other aquatic plants from out-competing them. Coral-root orchid is found at only one location on the reserve.

== History ==
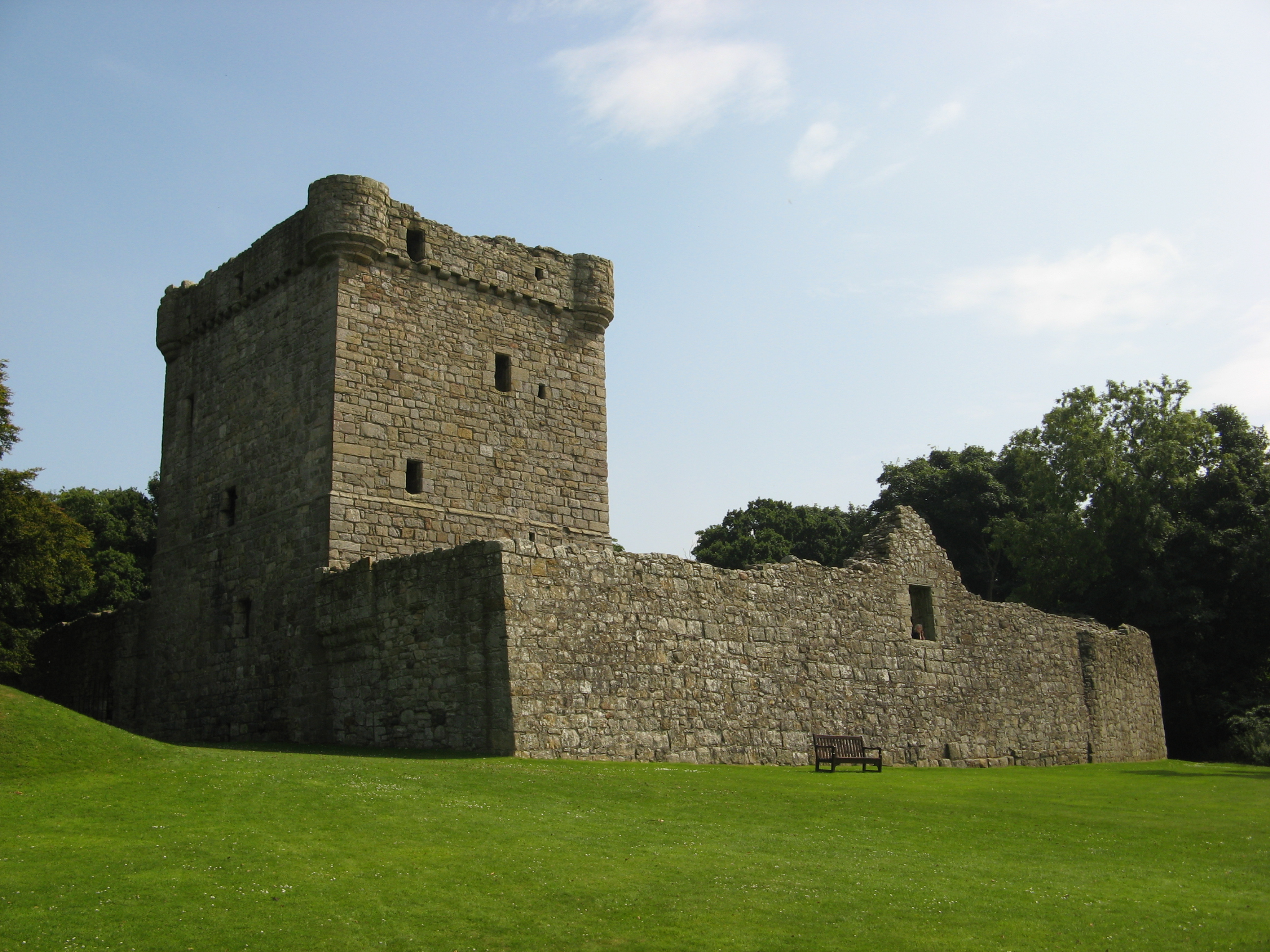
Lochleven Castle

The area around Loch Leven has been inhabited for millennia, and the remains of a crannog (a dwelling constructed on an artificial island, probably during the Iron Age) have been found off Kirkgate Park.

St Serf's Inch was the home of a Culdee and then an Augustinian monastic community, St Serf's Inch Priory. There was a monastic community on the island which was old in the 12th century. The monastery produced a series of Gaelic language charters from the 11th and 12th centuries which were translated into Latin in the late 12th century. It was here that Prior Andrew of Wyntoun wrote the Orygynale Cronykil of Scotland.

Lochleven Castle is strongly associated with Mary, Queen of Scots, who was imprisoned here in 1567–1568, and forced to abdicate as queen, before escaping with the help of her gaoler's family. After her escape her forces were defeated at the Battle of Langside, and she fled to England. Several relics were found during the partial draining of the loch in 1826–36, one of them being a sceptre, "apparently of cane, hilted with ivory, and mounted with silver, upon which … were the letters of the words, 'Mary, Queen of Scots'", found near the Mary Knowe, where she is supposed to have landed after her escape from the castle. Kinross House lies on the western shore of the loch facing out to the castle. It was built in 1684–1695 by its owner, the architect Sir William Bruce.

Visitors to Loch Leven have long noted the abundance of wildlife here:

In this lough is fish every day gotten for store, none in Britain like, and consider the bigness of it as also for fowl. There is a river they call the Leven running out of it eight miles to the sea, and in it is salmons... there be great store of all kinds of wildfowl, of wild geese there being continually seen 3,000 or 4,000, and swans many.

— Sir Christopher Lowther, 1692.

What appears to contribute most to the redness and rich taste of Loch Leven trout is the vast quantity of small shellfish, red in colour, which abound all over the bottom of the loch especially among the aquatic weeds.

— Statistical Accounts of Scotland, 1793.

In 1827 an Act of Parliament was passed "for recovering, draining and preserving certain lands in the counties of Fife and Kinross; and for better supplying with water the mills, Manufactories and Bleach fields and other works situated on or near the River Leven in the said county of Fife". The work was undertaken to provide a more reliable water supply to industries along the River Leven, and involved the lowering of the level of the loch, and straightening of the River Leven: the old meanders of the river are visible in aerial photographs of the area.

== Leisure and visitors ==
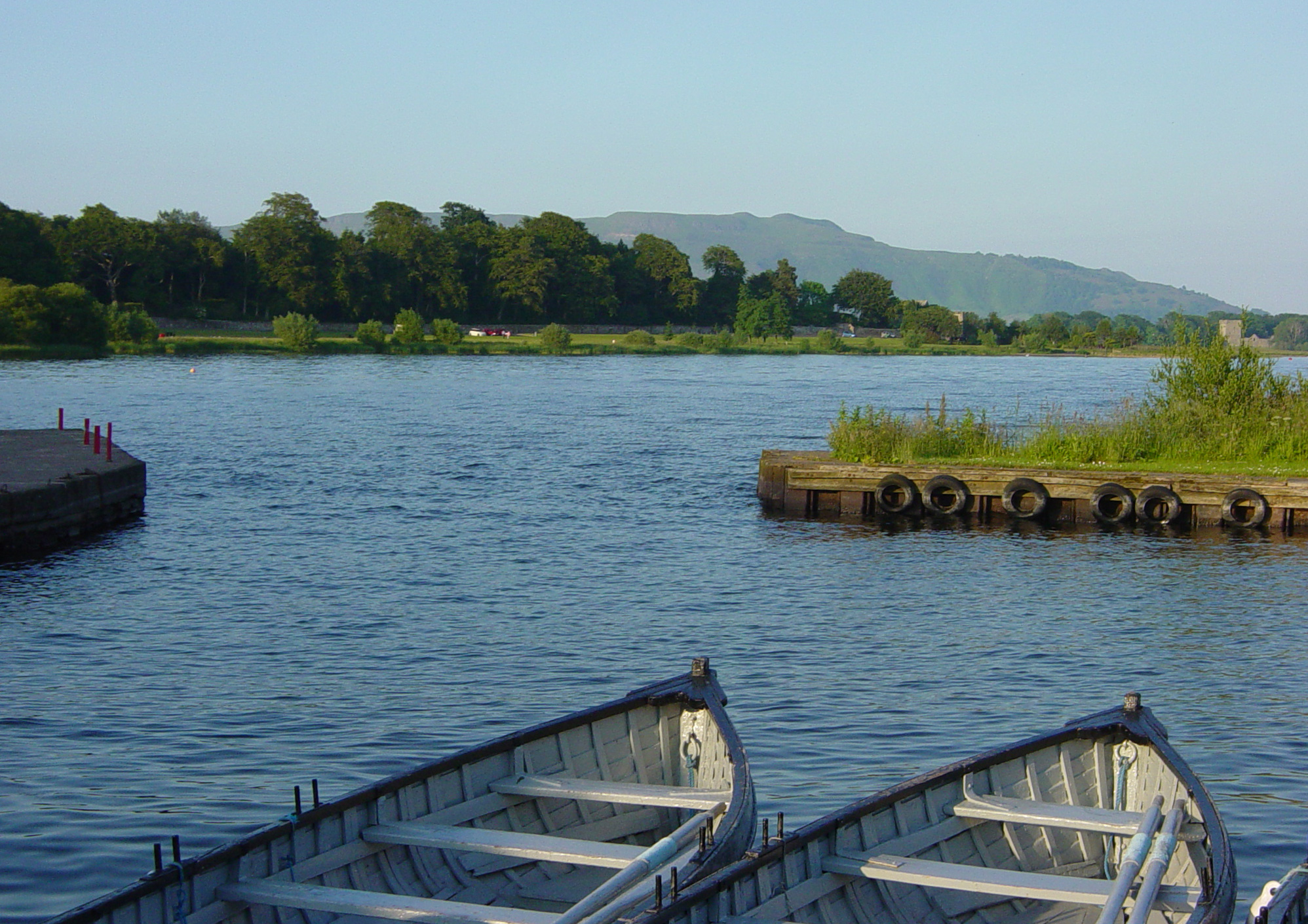
View east across Loch Leven from Kinross

There is an all abilities path around the loch, known as the Loch Leven Heritage Trail, which can be accessed from seven different car parks around the loch at Kinross Pier; Kirkgate Park; Burleigh Sands; Loch Leven's Larder; Findatie; RSPB Loch Leven car park; and the car park at the Cashmere Factory. The trail was completed in 2014, and as of 2016 NatureScot estimated that 200,000 people were using it annually. The RSPB run a visitor centre on their section of the reserve which as of 2016 was receiving around 70,000 visitors each year. The centre has facilities including a shop, café, observation room, educational facilities, toilets, and marked trails leading to three bird hides. A further three open hides are provided at locations around the loch.

Loch Leven is strongly associated with the sport of curling, and Kinross Curling Club, founded 1668, is reputedly the oldest in the world. The loch has been the site of the most extensive outdoor tournaments in the sport, the Grand Match or Bonspiel, however the ice has not been thick enough for this since 1959. The cold weather of the 2010/11 winter led to much speculation that a Bonspiel could be held, however due to safety concerns only informal matches were held on the loch. The loch is also a popular location for angling (chiefly for brown trout) and wildfowling.

== Conservation designations ==
Loch Leven National Nature Reserve
- IUCN category II (national park)
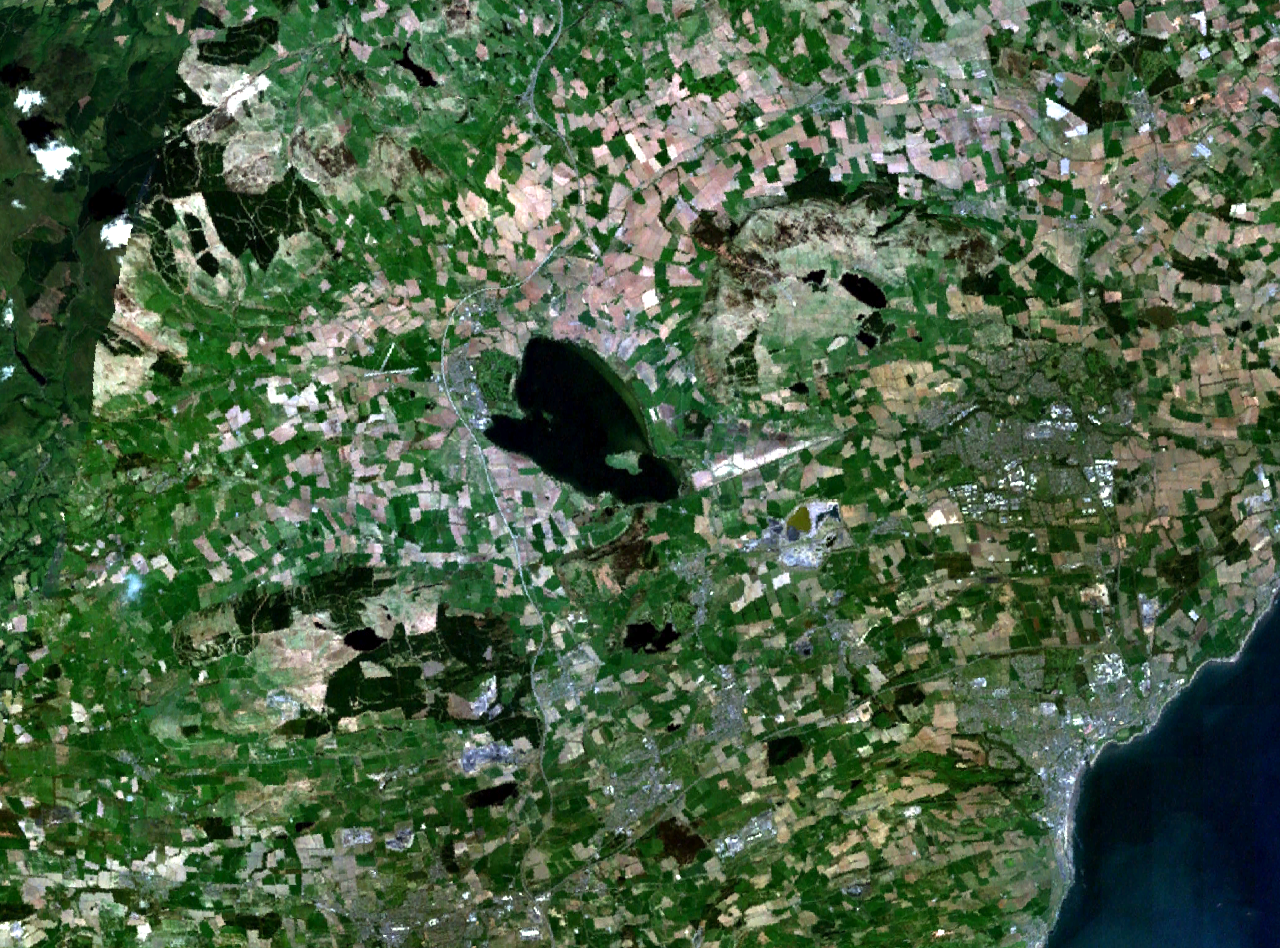
- Satellite photograph of Loch Leven and the surrounding area
- Interactive map of Loch Leven National Nature Reserve
- Area: 1,823 ha (7.04 sq mi)
- Designation: NatureScot
- Established: 1964
- Website: Loch Leven NNR

Ramsar Wetland
- Official name: Loch Leven
- Designated: 5 January 1976
- Reference no.: 72

Loch Leven forms the main part of the Loch Leven national nature reserve (NNR), which covers 1,823 ha (4,500 acres) of loch and islands. The NNR is managed by NatureScot, with the wetlands on the southern shore being managed by the Royal Society for the Protection of Birds (RSPB) and the fishing and shooting managed by Kinross Estate. Castle Island is managed by Historic Environment Scotland, who also run the ferry to the island. Loch Leven was first declared a National Nature Reserve in 1964 and re-declared in 2002, when it was extended to include the RSPB Loch Leven section. The NNR is classified as a Category II protected area by the International Union for Conservation of Nature.

As an internationally important site for wildlife Loch Leven holds a number of different conservation designations, being designated as a Site of Special Scientific Interest (SSSI), a Special Protection Area (SPA), and a Ramsar site.

There are also sites designated for their historical value surrounding Loch Leven. Lochleven Castle and St Serf's Priory are Scheduled Monuments. Kinross House is a Category A listed building, and its grounds are listed in the Inventory of Gardens and Designed Landscapes in Scotland.

Although greatly improved in recent years, the loch continues to suffer from a high phosphorus load and other pollution, primarily as a result of surrounding agricultural practices, which has contributed to occasional algal blooms on the loch and reduced feature condition. Work is ongoing to continue to reduce these effects, however it is thought that increasing summer temperatures now play a significant role in the formation of these blooms.
