= Lomond Hills =

Range of hills in central Scotland

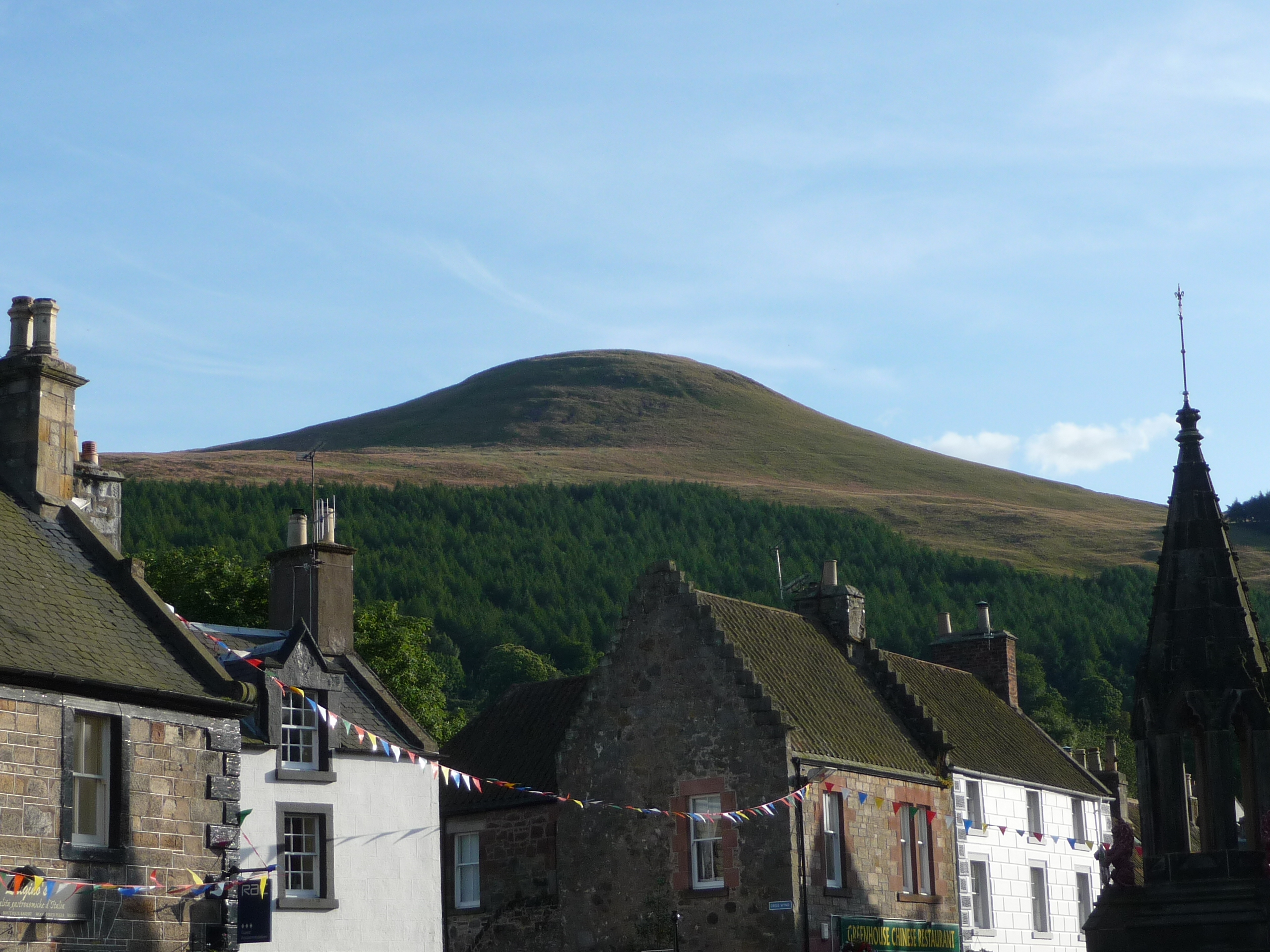
- East Lomond or Falkland Hill

Highest point
- Elevation: 522 m (1,713 ft)
- Coordinates: 56°14′16″N 3°15′14″W

Geography
- Location: Fife and Kinross-shire, Scotland

Climbing
- First ascent: Unknown
- Easiest route: From Fife

The Lomond Hills are a group of hills on the border of Fife and Kinross-shire in central Scotland, including East Lomond, West Lomond, and also Bishop Hill. At 522 metres (1,713 ft), West Lomond is the highest point in the Lomonds as well as the highest point in Fife.

== Etymology ==
The name Lomond was first recorded in 1315 in the plural form Lomondys. It may derive from a Pictish cognate of Welsh llumon, meaning "beacon", an element found for example in the hill-name Pumlumon in Wales. Another suggested etymology is Gaelic lom monadh, "bare hill", perhaps adapted from an earlier Pictish name containing cognate elements. East and West Lomond have historically also been known as the "Paps of Fife".

== Physical geography ==
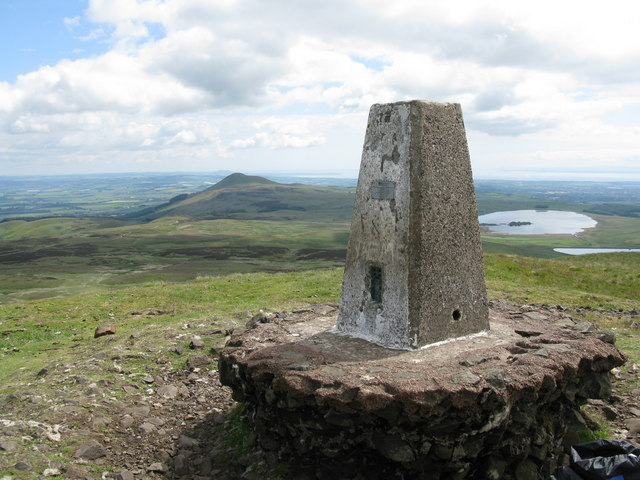
Summit Cone, West Lomond

The Lomond Hills contain two prominent peaks, West Lomond and East Lomond (or Falkland Hill) (448 metres (1,470 ft)), which sit just under 5 kilometres (3.1 mi) apart above a long north and west-facing escarpment over 10 kilometres (6.2 mi) in length. The escarpment, made from beds of sandstone, limestone and a quartz-dolerite sill, rises steeply from the low ground to the north and west to a plateau of around 350 metres (1,150 ft) in height between the peaks of East and West Lomond. The western portion of the escarpment runs southwards from West Lomond beyond the deep valley of the Glen Burn (Glen Vale) to Bishop Hill (locally, simply The Bishop) (461 metres (1,512 ft)). The steep-sided peaks of East and West Lomond themselves are volcanic in origin. Along the edges of the sandstone bed at the foot of the scarp slopes are several strikingly eroded outcrops, the most famous of which are the Bunnet Stane and John Knox's Pulpit, so named because it is believed to be a spot where covenanters held conventicles in the 17th century. There are also striking outcrops in the columnar jointing at the edge of the dolerite sill on Bishop Hill, most notably Carlin Maggie.

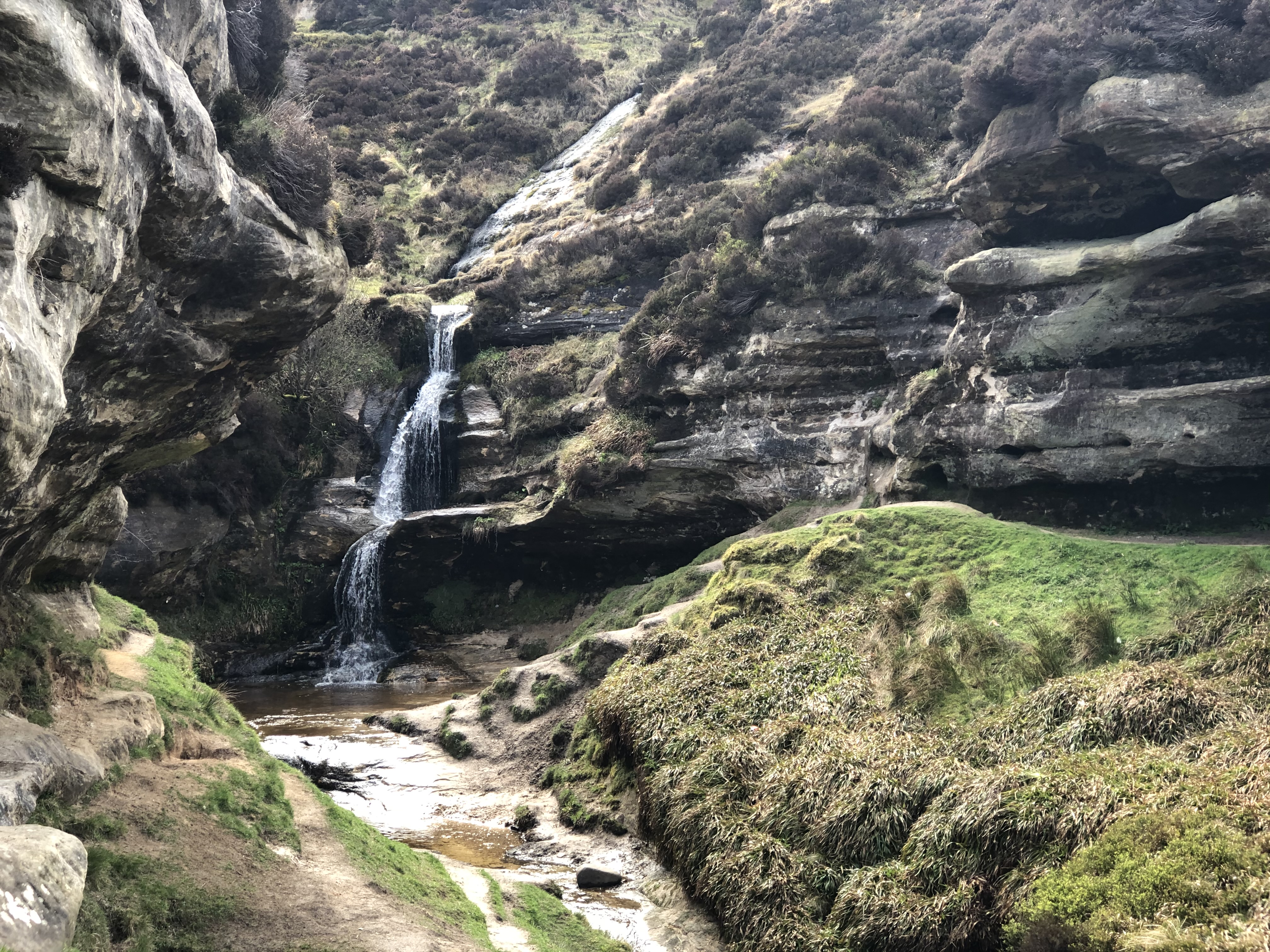
John Knox’s Pulpit, Fife (2021)

The River Eden, one of the two primary rivers in Fife, has its source on the slopes of West Lomond. On the northern slopes of the Lomond Hills, two burns run down from the plateau in impressive gorges. These are the Maspie Burn and the Arraty Burn. Maspie Den has a path running along its length to an undercut waterfall at the top, which can be accessed just beyond Falkland House (approaching from the Falkland direction). Glen Vale with the Glen Burn, to the south of West Lomond, is equally impressive.

== Geology ==
The hills are formed from early Carboniferous sedimentary rocks overlying Devonian sandstones and intruded by sills and volcanic plugs during late Carboniferous and Permian times. The lower ground to the north and west is formed from late Devonian rocks of the Glenvale Sandstone Formation traditionally ascribed to the Old Red Sandstone. Overlying this and forming the lower slopes of the scarp are the early Carboniferous sandstones of the Knox Pulpit and the Kinnesswood formations. Next in succession are the Pathhead Formation rocks which include cycles of sandstones, siltstones, mudstones, ironstones and limestone, formerly referred to as the Calciferous Sandstone Measures. These in turn are overlain by the varied cyclic sequences of the Lower Limestone Formation.

The igneous rocks are relatively resistant to erosion and form the main scarp and two summits. A quartz-dolerite sill of probable Permo-Carboniferous age, forming a part of the Midland Valley Sill Complex intrudes the early Carboniferous sedimentary rocks of the Lower Limestone Formation. The peaks of West Lomond and Green Hill are nepheline-basanite intrusions whilst East Lomond is a teschenite/olivine dolerite intrusion and vent agglomerate. A few faults affect the escarpment vertically offsetting the crags on either side. The Coul Fault is a northerly downthrowing fault aligned WNW-ESE running through the range and beneath Ballo Reservoir.

Many lower areas are draped with glacial till from the last ice age. Easterly directed meltwater channels occur around the northeastern and southern margins.

== History ==
The remains of Iron Age hill forts can be found around the summit of East Lomond and at Maiden Castle, a grassy knoll that lies between East and West Lomond.

In more recent history, the Lomond Hills were mined for limestone, ore and lead, although there are no longer any working quarries there today. On the southwest slopes of East Lomond are the well preserved remains of a limekiln and quarry.

Beneath the northern slopes of the escarpment lies Falkland Estate, an area of forest (now commercial plantation), where the kings of Scotland would have hunted whilst staying at nearby Falkland Palace. The present custodian of the palace is Ninian Crichton-Stuart, brother of the Marquess of Bute.

== Recreation and land management ==
Due to the steep gradients and poor soil, the primary land uses on the Lomond Hills are sheep grazing and commercial forestry (predominantly on the steep north slopes) and water catchment. There are six reservoirs in the Lomond Hills that were originally constructed to supply water to the rapidly growing mining towns of west Fife.

The Lomond Hills lie within the boundaries of Fife Regional Park, renamed the Lomond Hills Regional Park in 2003, and have their own ranger service who work principally with the landowners, estate managers and farmers on issues such as public access to help minimise the impact of recreational activities on their day-to-day business. The park covers approximately 65 square kilometres (25 sq mi) and is divided as follows: 1,120 hectares (2,800 acres) of land is in public ownership: 500 hectares (1,200 acres) belong to Fife Council and 620 are owned by Scottish Water. The balance of 5,355 hectares (13,230 acres) is privately owned.

As a result of their accessibility and proximity to several major population centres, the hills are very popular with walkers. This has resulted in a considerable amount of footpath erosion, particularly on the steeper sections, that the ranger service and volunteer workers are taking measures to counteract. Both East and West Lomond can easily be climbed from Craigmead Car Park, which lies between the two at a height of around 300 metres (980 ft). Alternative routes exist from the Bunnet Stane, the village of Falkland and the car park at the masts, high on East Lomond. The views from both summits, due to their prominence, are magnificent, stretching from the Highlands to the Borders, with the sea in the east.

As well as walking, there are a number of other recreational activities that take place in the Lomonds. East Lomond, due to the easy access from the high car park, is often used by paragliders on windy days. The Falkland Hill Race is held annually and begins at the fountain in the centre of Falkland village. The competitors must run (or in many cases walk) to the summit of East Lomond before returning to the fountain. The wooded northern slopes of East Lomond also boast a series of downhill mountainbike tracks.

Gliders from the Scottish Gliding Centre at Portmoak between Bishop Hill and Loch Leven may be seen riding the thermals above the hills.

== Gallery ==
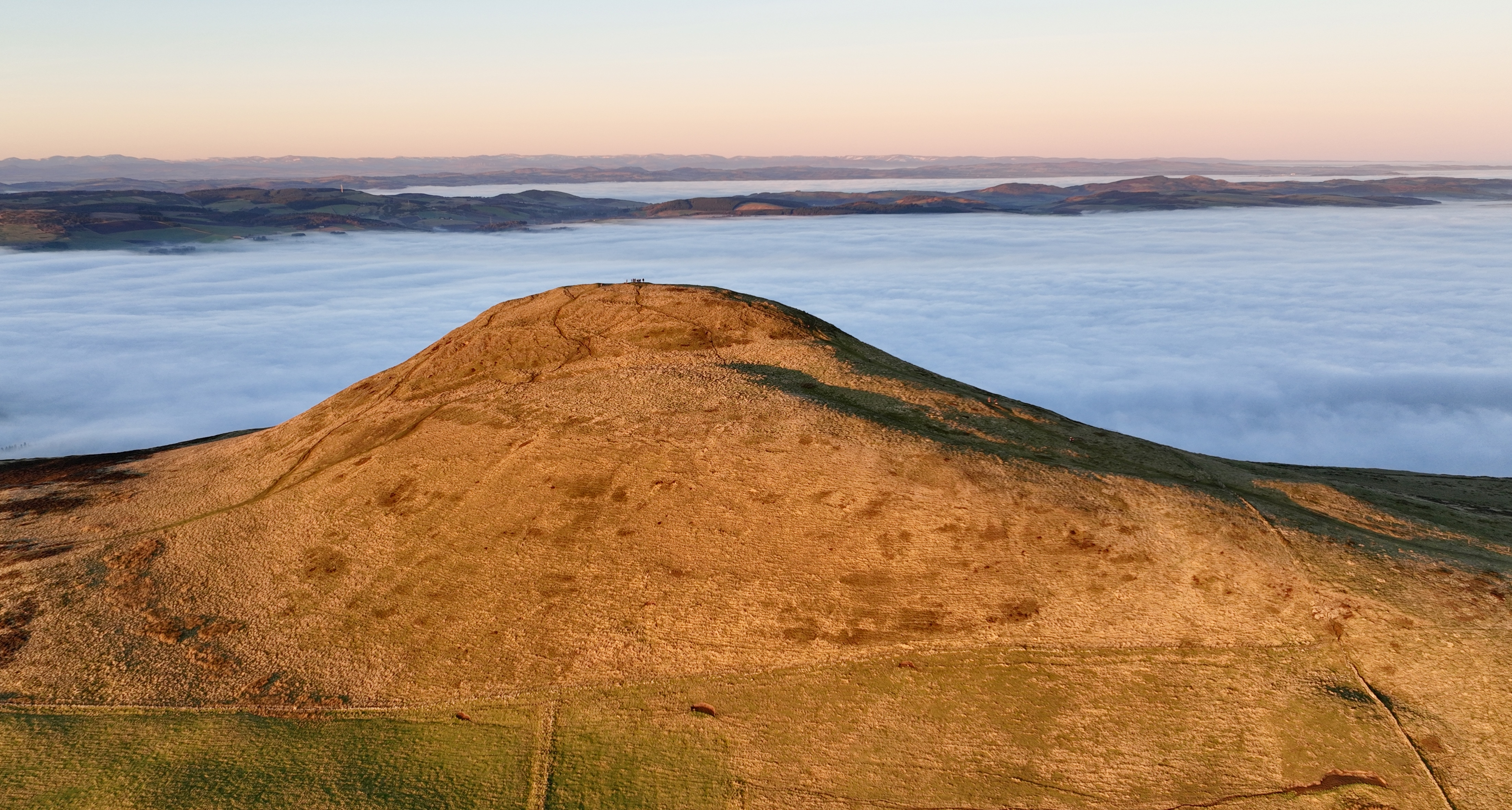
East Lomond during a temperature inversion. December 2021.

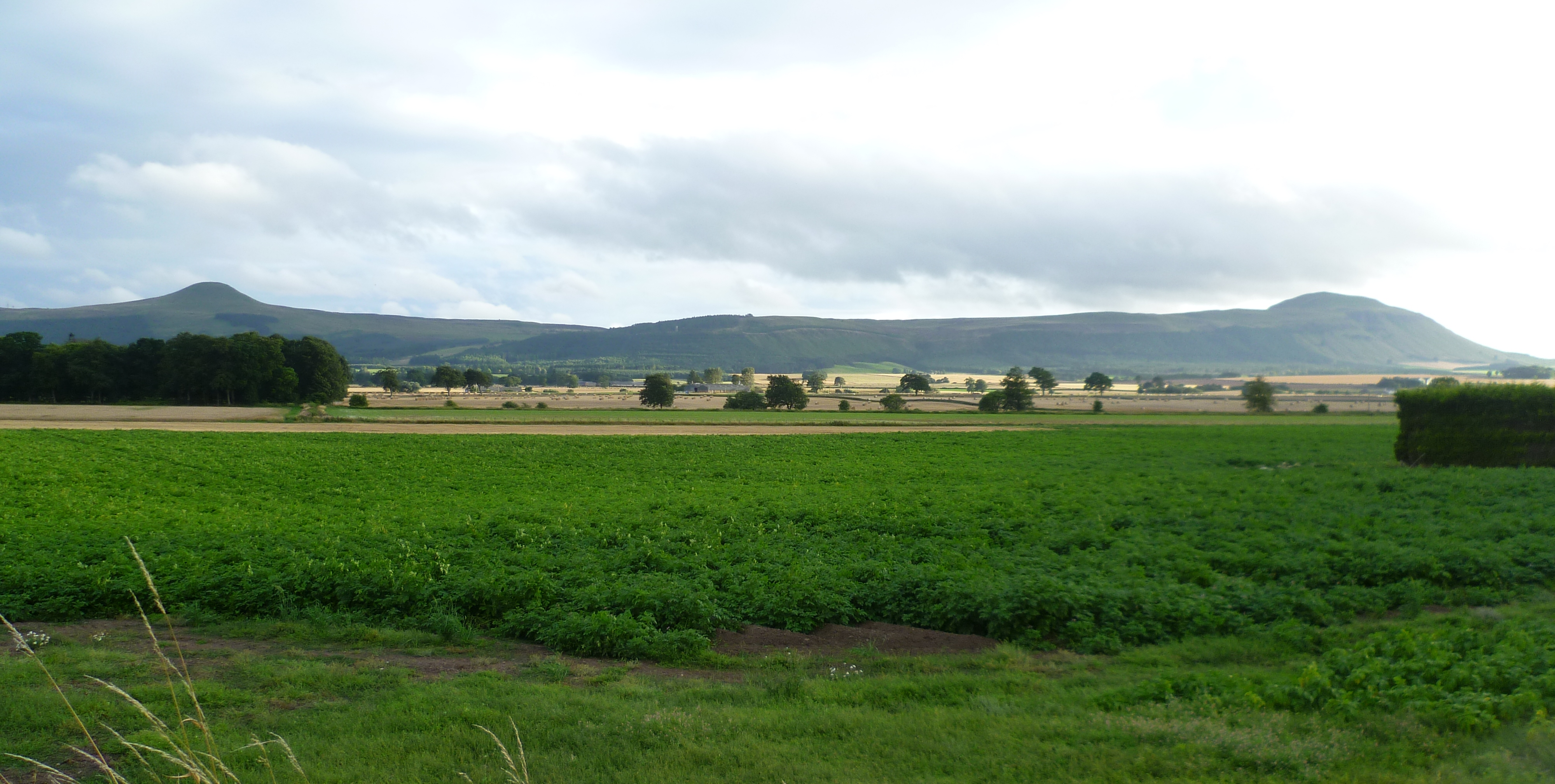
The Lomond Hills seen from Auchtermuchty in the Howe of Fife

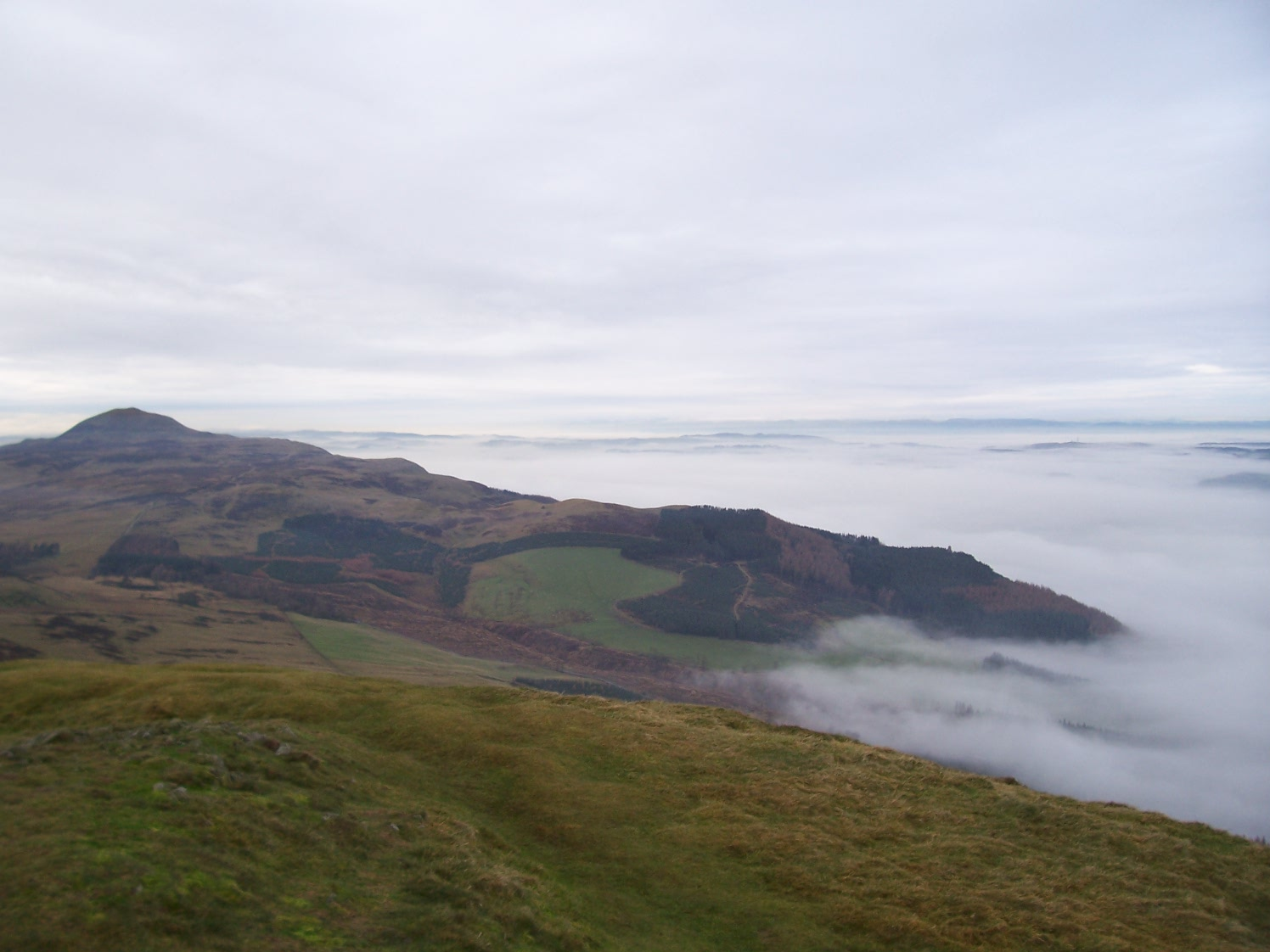
West Lomond from East Lomond

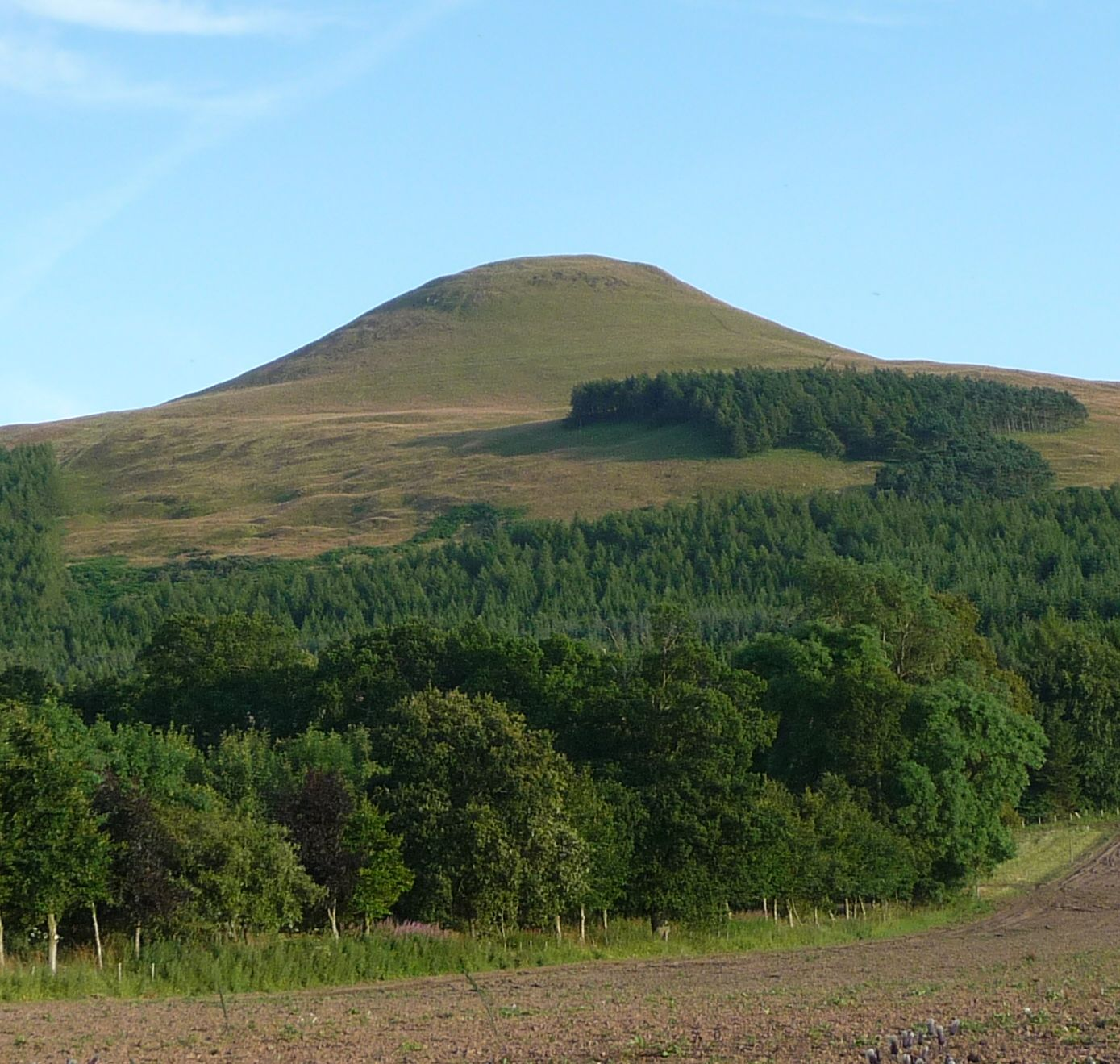
Falkland Hill, also known as one of the Paps of Fife. "Pap" is a term for a human breast, the word also applied to hills resembling them.

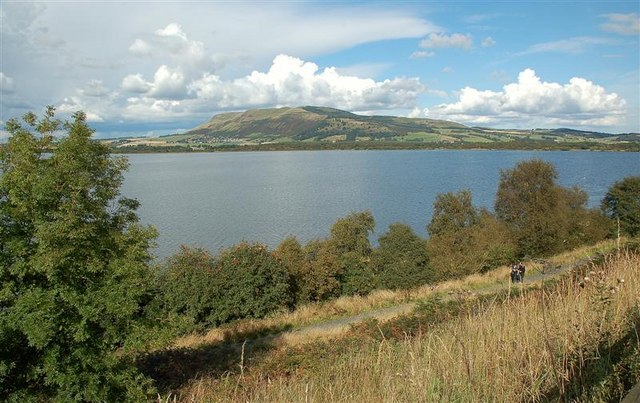
Bishop Hill

== See also ==
- List of mountains in Scotland
- Maiden Paps
- Breast shaped hills
