= A912 road =

Road in Scotland

Coordinates: 56.3594998318°N 3.41656802711°W

A912

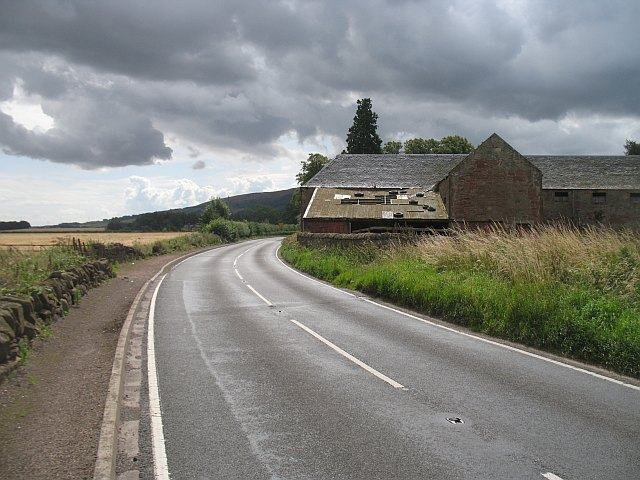
- A section in Fife, passing Easter Cash between Falkland and Strathmiglo

Major junctions
- North end: A9
- A989 (Perth Inner Ring Road); A913; A91
- South end: A92

Location
- Country: United Kingdom

Road network
- Roads in the United Kingdom; Motorways; A and B road zones

The A912 is a major road in both Perth and Kinross and Fife, Scotland. It runs from the A9 in Perth, in the north, to the A92 at Muirhead, in the south. Part of it was formerly part of the A90.

== Course ==
From the Inveralmond Roundabout, the road travels southeasterly, as the Dunkeld Road, towards Perth's city centre. After crossing the roundabout where it meets the A85 Crieff Road, it continues southeasterly, briefly becoming Barrack Street before its junction with Caledonian Road and Atholl Street (the A989, the Perth Inner Ring Road).

A short distance later, it turns east onto King's Place, then Marshall Place, before turning south as it passes through the eastern third of the South Inch as the Edinburgh Road. Continuing south, it passes beneath the M90 interchange at Craigend, before crossing the River Earn at Bridge of Earn.

Turning southeast, it passes beneath the M90 again as it continues towards Aberargie and the junction of the A913.

Following the River Farg in a southerly direction, the road meets the B996 at the Bein Inn in Glenfarg. This was the original southern end of the A912, prior to the opening of the M90.

Continuing south, passing to the west of Balvaird Castle and crossing Barroway Burn, it meets the A91 on its northern side.

The A912 runs concurrently with the A91 to the northeast for just over two miles, at which point, near Strathmiglo, it leaves again on its southern side.

After crossing the River Eden, the A912 continues southeast, crossing Arraty Burn before passing through Falkland and onwards to its terminus at the New Inn Roundabout in Muirhead.
