= Kinross-shire =

Coordinates: 56°15′N 3°25′W

- Historic county
- Country: Scotland
- County town: Kinross

Area
  - Total: 73 sq mi (189 km^{2})
- Ranked 33rd of 34
- Chapman code: KRS

The County of Kinross or Kinross-shire is a historic county and registration county in eastern Scotland, administered as part of Perth and Kinross since 1975. Surrounding its largest settlement and county town of Kinross, the county borders Perthshire to the north and Fife to the east, south and west.

Scotland's second smallest county, Kinross-shire is dominated by Loch Leven, a large inland loch, with two islands and an internationally important nature reserve. One of the islands contains a castle, where Mary, Queen of Scots was once held prisoner. Much of the land in Kinross-shire is fertile agricultural land and most of the inhabitants were originally employed in farming. The gently-rolling farmland surrounding Loch Leven gives way to steep, more rugged terrain at the outskirts of the county.

== History ==
=== Administrative history ===
The Kinross-shire area was anciently part of the province of Fothriff. By the early thirteenth century, Fothriff had been joined to the earldom of Fife. Sometime between the reign of David I (reigned 1124–1153) and the mid-thirteenth century, this part of Scotland was divided into shires, being areas administered by a sheriff. By 1252 there was a sheriff of Kinross, initially with authority over just the two parishes of Kinross and Orwell.

Over time, Scotland's shires became more significant than the old provinces, with more administrative functions being given to the sheriffs. The larger earldom of Fife was therefore gradually eclipsed in importance by the smaller shire of Fife and the two other small shires within the earldom, being Kinross-shire and Clackmannanshire. In 1667 Commissioners of Supply were established for each shire, which would serve as the main administrative body for the area until the creation of county councils in 1890. Cleish, Portmoak and Tullibole were added to Kinross-shire in 1685. Following the Acts of Union in 1707, the English term "county" came to be used interchangeably with the older term "shire".

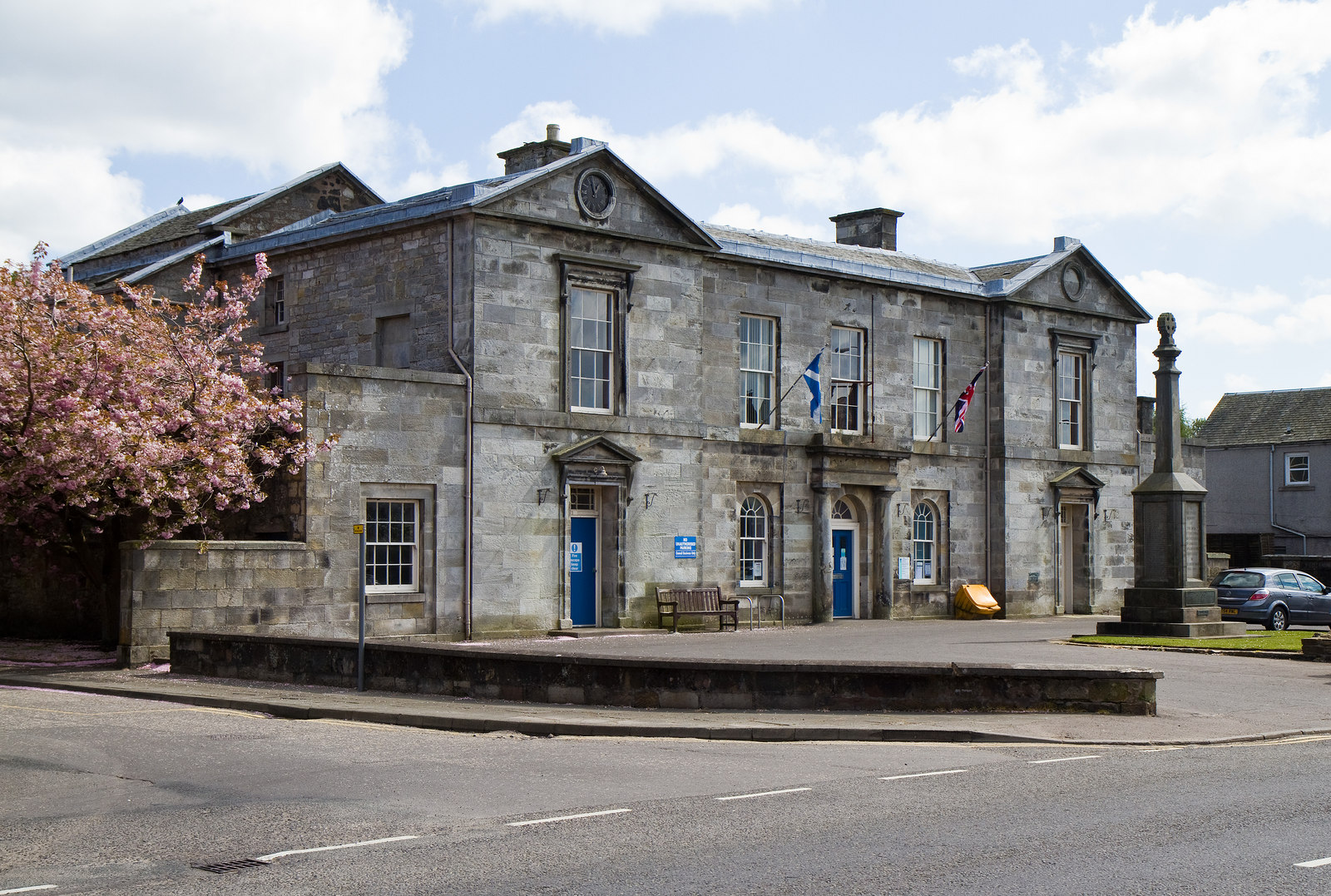
County Buildings, Kinross, the former headquarters of Kinross County Council

Elected county councils were established in 1890 under the Local Government (Scotland) Act 1889, taking most of the functions of the commissioners (which were eventually abolished in 1930). Kinross County Council held its first meeting on 22 May 1890 at the County Buildings in Kinross, the courthouse (built 1826) which also served as the meeting place for the commissioners.

The 1889 Act also led to a review of boundaries, with exclaves being transferred to a county they actually bordered, and parishes which straddled more than one county being adjusted such that each parish was entirely in a single county. There were several such changes affecting the boundaries of Kinross-shire.

Kinross-shire was the least populous of the Scottish counties at the 1921 census, with fewer than 8,000 people. Due to its low population, the Local Government (Scotland) Act 1929 combined the county councils of Kinross-shire and neighbouring Perthshire for most purposes in 1930. The two councils continued to be elected as separate bodies, but operated together as the "Perth and Kinross Joint County Council", serving the combined area of the two counties.

Kinross County Council did perform some roles alone after 1930, notably acting as the district council for Kinross-shire, which was considered too small to be divided into districts. The county council remained based at the County Buildings until its abolition in 1975.

Kinross-shire was abolished as an administrative area in 1975 under the Local Government (Scotland) Act 1973, which replaced Scotland's counties, burghs and landward districts with a two-tier structure of upper-tier regions and lower-tier districts. Kinross-shire became part of the Perth and Kinross district in the Tayside region. Further local government reforms in 1996 under the Local Government etc. (Scotland) Act 1994 saw the regions and districts created in 1975 abolished and replaced with council areas providing all local government services. Perth and Kinross district became one of the new council areas. The boundaries of the historic county of Kinross-shire are still used for some limited official purposes connected with land registration, being a registration county.

=== Economic history ===
The county suffered a decline in population in the 19th and 20th centuries, as its inhabitants migrated to the cities to find work in manufacturing, etc. The population in 1891 was 6,673; in 1971 it was 6,423. The decline was hastened by the closure of the railways in the county soon after the Second World War. However, in recent years, construction of the M90 motorway north of the Forth Road Bridge has resulted in the area becoming more prominent. Tourism has increased, with visitors attracted by the unspoiled country villages and gently rolling hills reaching the shores of Loch Leven. The villages of Kinnesswood and Scotlandwell are attractive, and there are ancient standing stones at Orwell. The T in the Park music festival was held in Balado from 1997 to 2014.

The economic outlook of Kinross-shire has improved and was recorded in 2009 as having an estimated population of 12,997. In addition, it outperformed both the Perth and Kinross area and Scotland averages in economic performance. The area is promoted by the Kinross-shire Partnership, a body bringing together local government, tourist organisations and local organisations.

== Geography ==
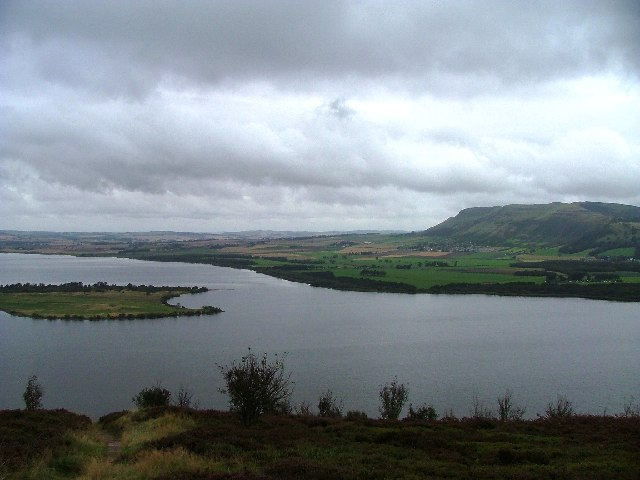
Loch Leven

Kinross-shire is landlocked and is generally flat, except in the north-west where the Ochil Hills are located, and along the southern boundary where the Cleish Hills can be found. The Ochils contain Innerdouny Hill, Kinross-shire's highest point at 497 m (1,631 ft). The most notable geographic feature of the county is Loch Leven which is also an important nature reserve; there are also several islands within the loch, the largest of which is St Serf's Inch (the others are Alice's Bower, Castle Island, Reed Bower, Roy's Folly and Scart Island). A much smaller body of water – the Arnot Reservoir – is located to the east of Loch Leven. On the far northern border a portion of the Glenfarg Reservoir lies within the county.

== Subdivisions ==
=== Burgh of Kinross ===
Kinross-shire contained only one burgh, Kinross. The burgh was originally created a burgh of barony in 1540/1 and became a burgh of regality in 1685. In 1864 it became a police burgh with an elected town council. It continued to exist until 1975.

=== Civil parishes ===
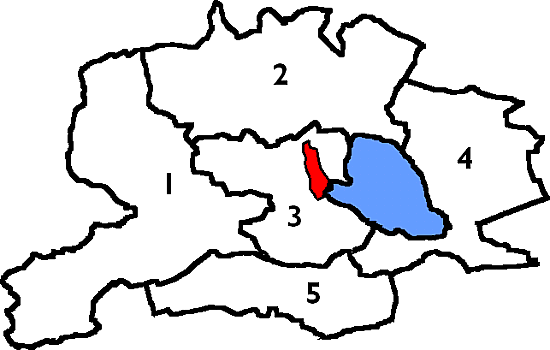
The civil parishes of Kinross-shire from 1891. The burgh of Kinross is shown in red, Loch Leven in blue.

The county was anciently divided into a number of parishes: Cleish, Orwell (containing the market town of Milnathort), Kinross and Portmoak were entirely in Kinross-shire. The parishes of Arngask, Fossoway, Tulliebole and Forgandenny were partly in Perthshire. From 1845 they were used for local government purposes and governed by parochial boards.

The Local Government (Scotland) Act 1889 created a boundary commission to ensure that all civil parishes lay within a single county. After the boundary changes the county contained five parishes: Fossoway (No. 1 on map), Orwell (2), Kinross (3), Portmoak (4) and Cleish (5).

From 1894 elected parish councils replaced the parochial boards. These in turn were abolished in 1930, and the powers they had exercised passed to the county council. Parishes continue to be used today for statistical purposes, though they no longer have any administrative function.

== Settlements ==
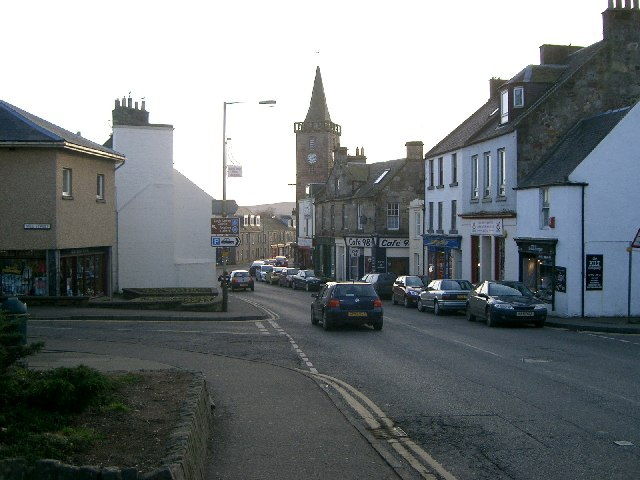
Kinross, capital and largest town of Kinross-shire

- Carnbo
- Cleish
- Crook of Devon
- Dalqueich
- Drunzie
- Duncrievie
- Glenfarg
- Glenlomond
- Kinnesswood
- Kinross
- Milnathort
- Scotlandwell
- Stronachie
- Tillyrie

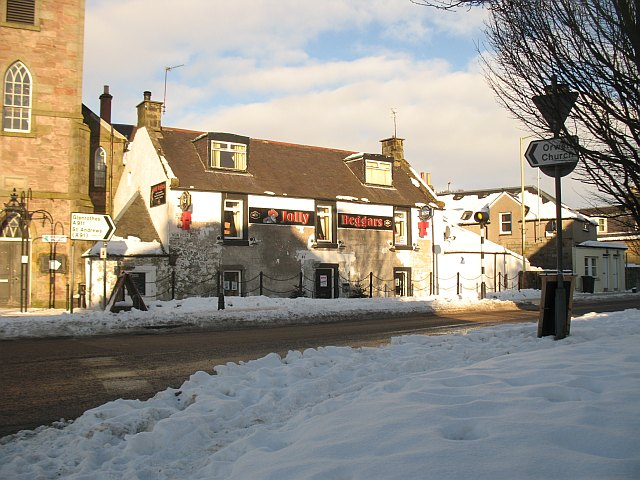
The centre of Milnathort in winter

== Transport ==
Kinross-shire is bisected north–south by the M90 motorway, which links Kinross to Perth in the north and Dunfermline in the south. The A911 enables west to east travel across the county.

There are no railway stations; previously there was one at Kinross however this is no longer open.

== Parliamentary constituency ==
=== Historic ===
From 1426 the county returned one member to the Parliament of Scotland.

=== United Kingdom parliament ===
Following the Act of Union, Kinross-shire returned members to the House of Commons in Westminster. Due to its small population, it was never a constituency in its own right: instead it alternated with Clackmannanshire, a member being returned for one county at one parliament and for the other at the next. The Representation of the People (Scotland) Act 1832 merged the two counties into a single constituency, Clackmannanshire and Kinross-shire.

In 1918, House of Commons seats were redistributed, and Kinross-shire was combined with part of Perthshire to form the constituency of Kinross and Western Perthshire. This constituency continued in existence until 1983.

== Coat of arms ==
The Kinross County Council received a grant of arms from Lord Lyon King of Arms on 18 May 1927. The arms depict Lochleven Castle. The motto adopted was "for all time": at the time of the grant the county council was campaigning to retain its independence from its larger neighbour Perthshire.

When Perth and Kinross District Council was granted arms in 1977, the Kinross-shire arms were placed on an inescutcheon, or small shield, in the centre of the new arms. These arms continue in use by the current Perth and Kinross Council.

== Places of interest ==
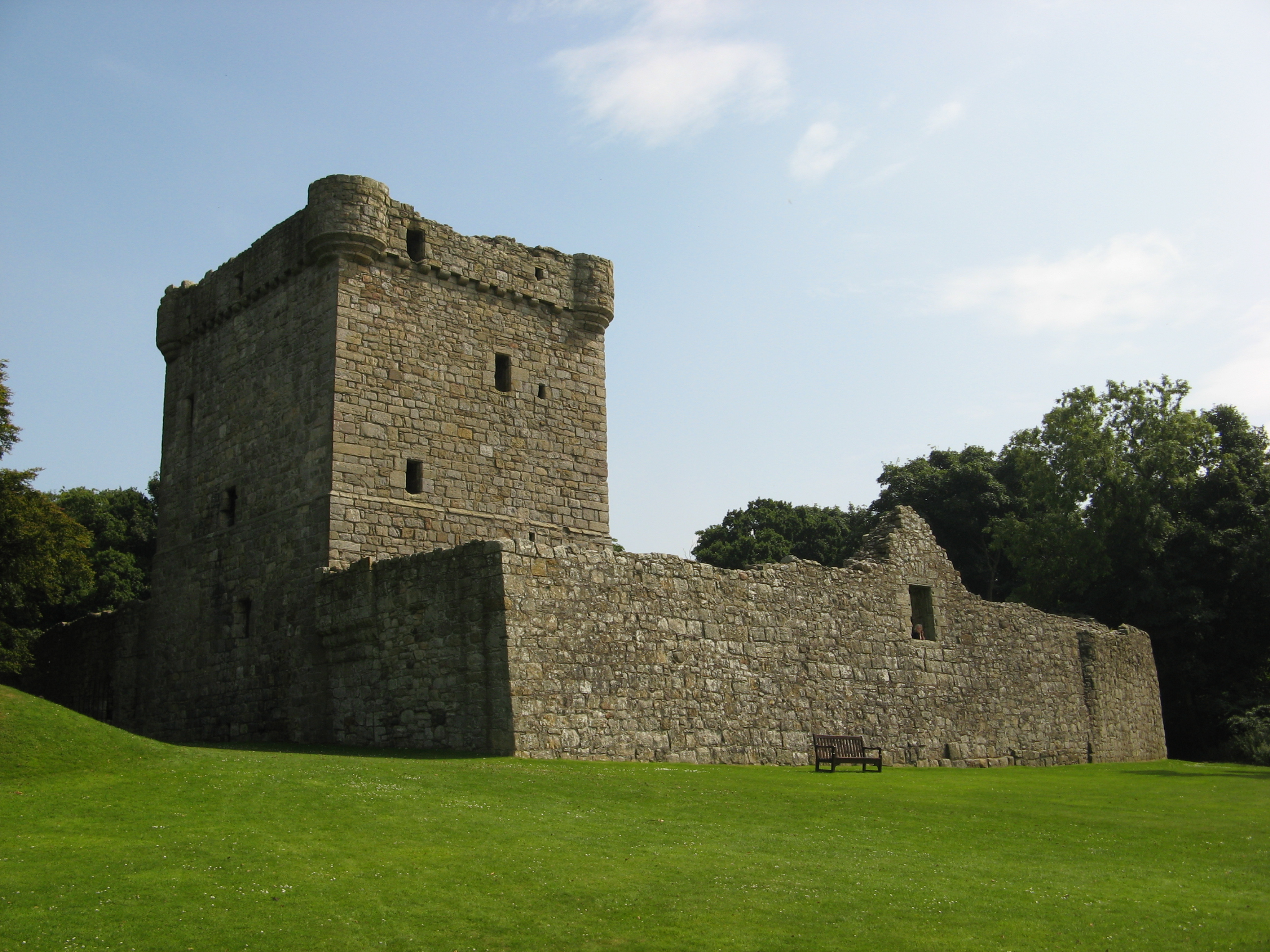
Lochleven Castle

- Cleish Castle
- Lochleven Castle
