= Arngask =

Coordinates: 56.28371°N 3.38808°W

Arngask: Scottish Gaelic: Ard-na-gaisk,
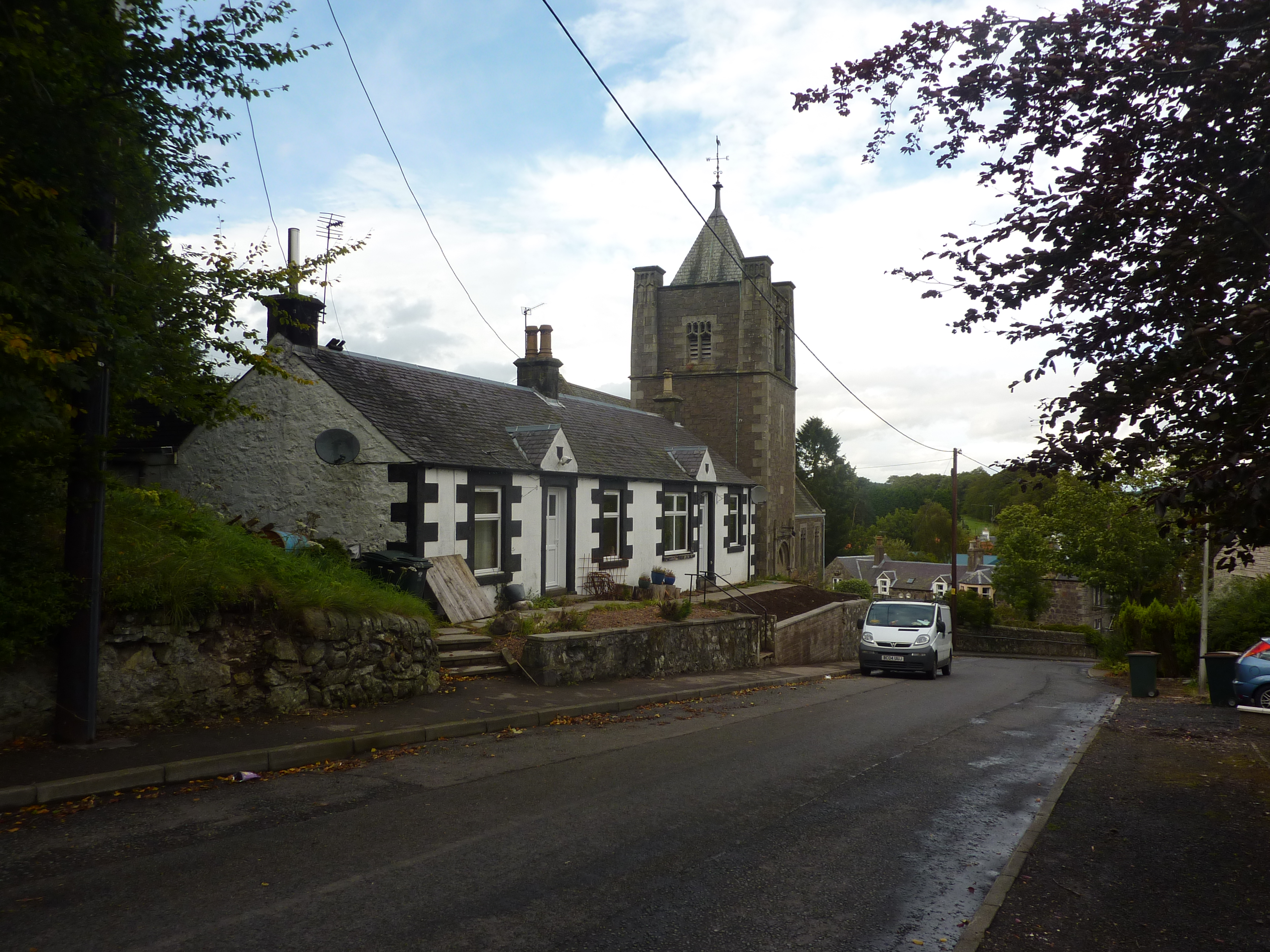
- Arngask Parish Church, Glenfarg

- Location within Perth and Kinross
- Population: 931 (2011)
- OS grid reference: NO135093
- Civil parish: Arngask
- Council area: Perth and Kinross
- Lieutenancy area: Perth and Kinross
- Country: Scotland
- Sovereign state: United Kingdom
- Post town: PERTH
- Postcode district: PH2
- Dialling code: 01577
- Police: Scotland
- Fire: Scottish
- Ambulance: Scottish
- UK Parliament: Perth and Kinross-shire
- Scottish Parliament: Ochil

Arngask is a civil parish in Perthshire, with the village of Glenfarg as its largest settlement. It lies in the south-east of the county, in the Ochil Hills and borders Fife and Kinross-shire. If forms part of a wider ecclesiastical parish of Abernethy and Dron and Arngask.

The parish includes five miles (8.0 km) of the upper reaches of the River Farg and has an area of 6,456 acres (10.1 mi^{2}; 26.1 km^{2}).

At the 2011 census, the population of the civil parish was 931.

== Settlements ==
- Duncrievie
- Glenfarg
