= Orwell, Kinross-shire =

Coordinates: 56.245°N 3.445°W

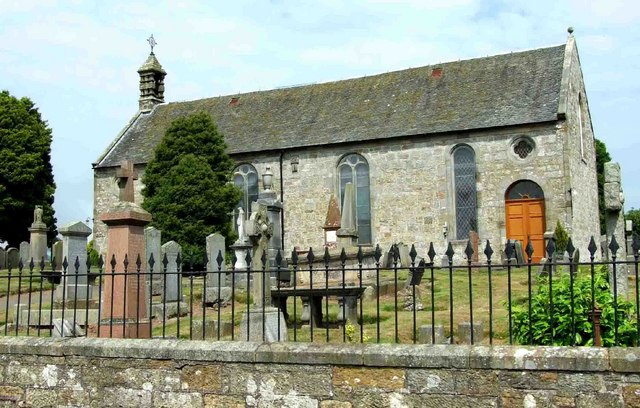
Orwell parish church, Milnathort

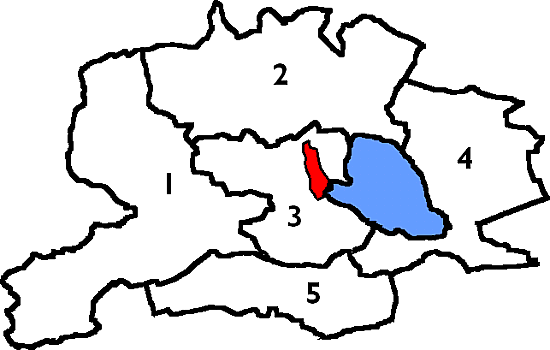
Parishes of Kinross-shire. Orwell is no. 2

Orwell is a parish in Kinross-shire, Scotland. It contains the market town of Milnathort, as well as the hamlet of Middleton. The name comes from the Gaelic iubhar coille meaning "yew wood".

The parish has an area of about 21 square miles (54 km^{2}). In the south it is quite flat, gradually becoming hillier further north, until one reaches the Ochil Hills at the northern boundary. In addition to Milnathort and Middleton, it contains several farms, some standing stones and Burleigh Castle. Its population was 3005 in 1831, dropped to 1983 in 1911, and rose to 2043 in 1951.

The Church of Scotland parish of Orwell and Portmoak includes Orwell church in Milnathort and Portmoak church in Scotlandwell.

== See also ==
- Thomas Mair
