= County Buildings, Kinross =

County building in Kinross, Scotland

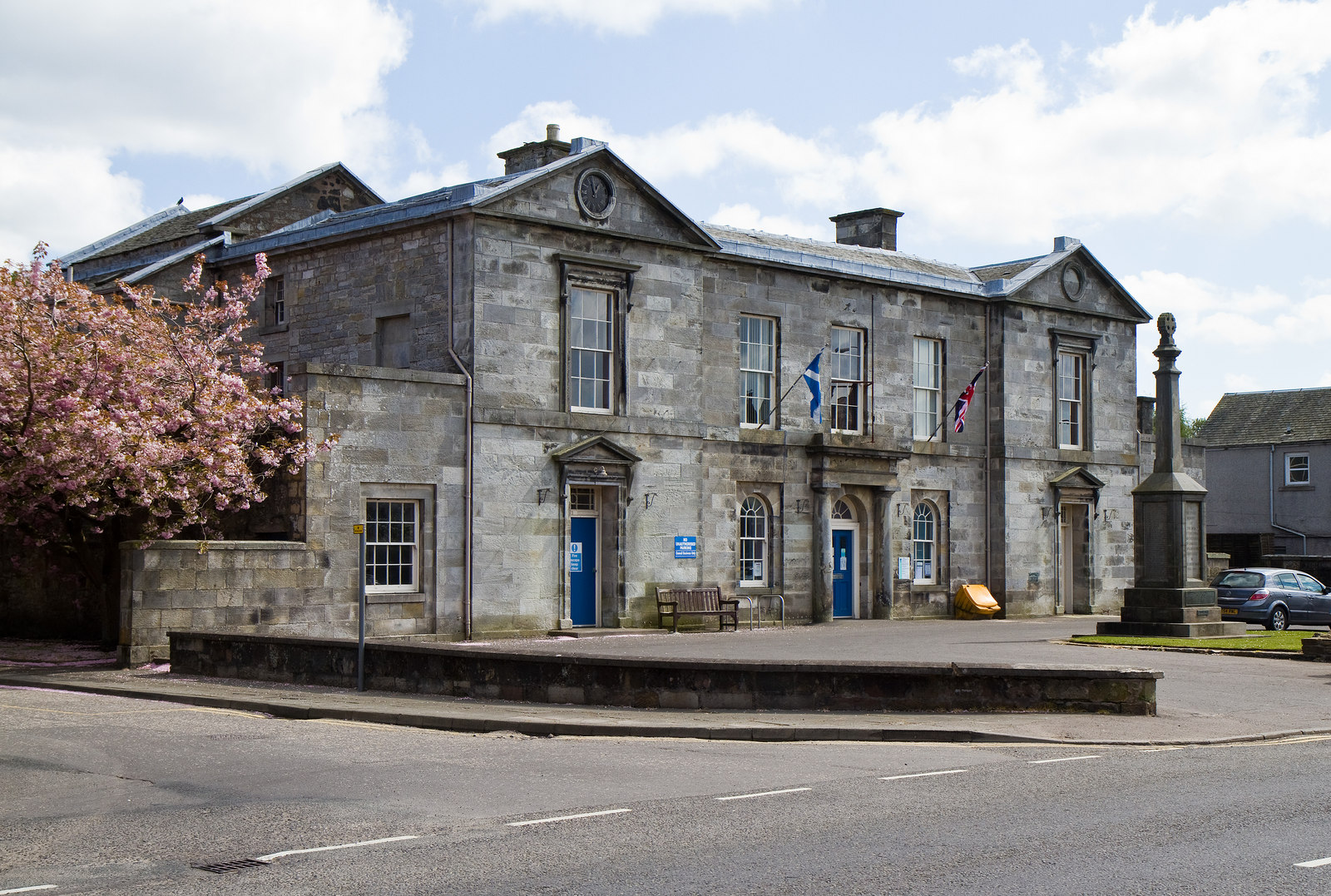
- County Buildings, Kinross

- Shown in Perth and Kinross
- 56.2066°N 3.4217°W
- Location: High Street, Kinross

History
- Built: 1826

Site notes
- Architect: Thomas Brown
- Architectural style: Neoclassical style

Listed Building – Category B
- Official name: County Buildings, 21, 23, 25 High Street, Kinross
- Designated: 5 October 1971
- Reference no.: LB36288

County Buildings is a municipal structure in the High Street in Kinross, Perth and Kinross, Scotland. The structure, which accommodates the local area offices for Perth and Kinross Council, is a Category B listed building.

== History ==
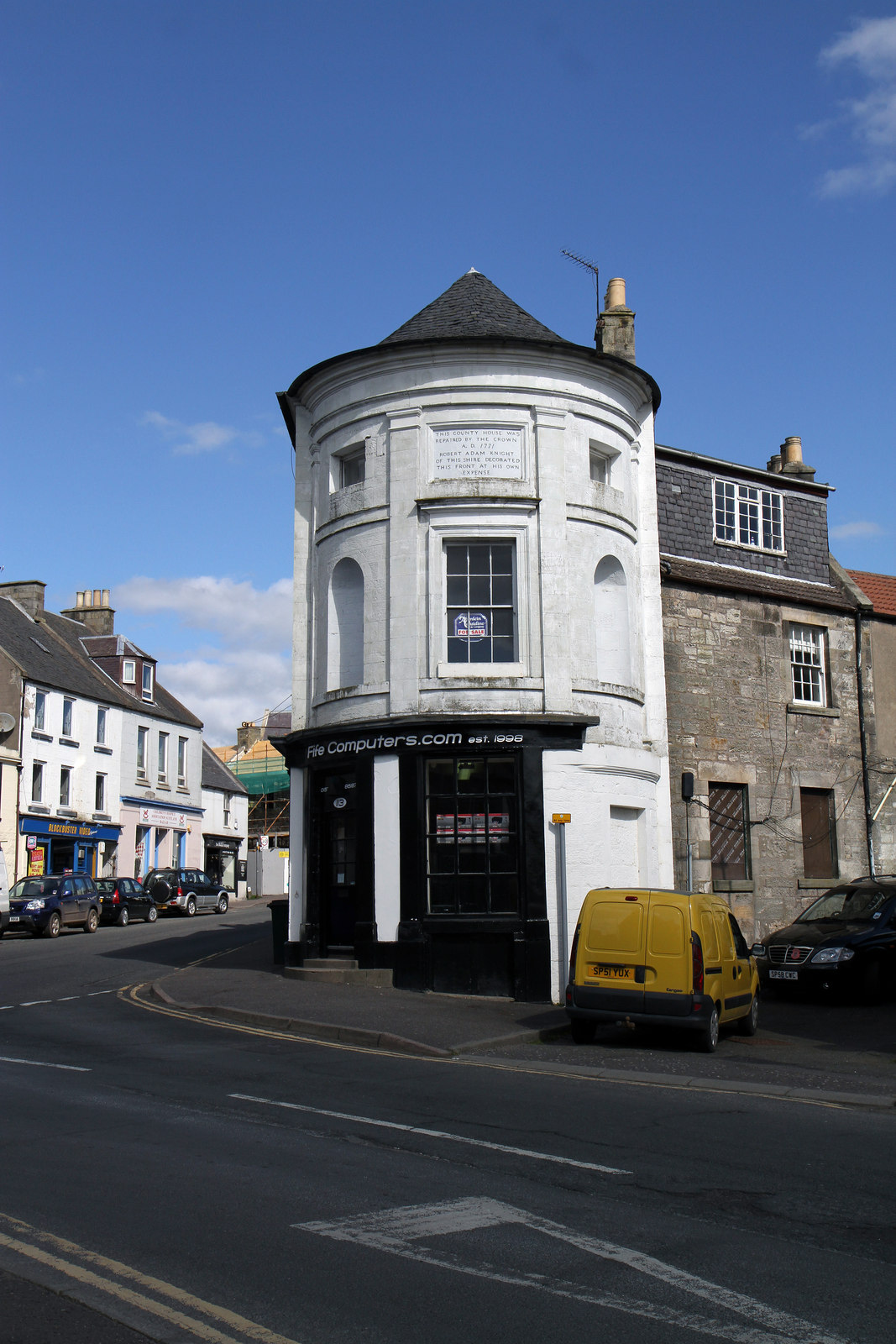
The first county hall for Kinross-shire

The first county hall in Kinross-shire was a modest structure in the High Street which was completed in around 1600. It was primarily used as a courthouse and was repaired to a design by the architect and local member of parliament, Robert Adam, in 1771. The design involved a prominent bowed frontage facing south down the High Street.

In the 1820s, the local sheriff decided that a more substantial courthouse was needed: a suitable site, further north along the High Street, was selected. The new building was designed by Thomas Brown of Uphall in the neoclassical style, built in ashlar stone at a cost of £2,000 and was completed in 1826.

The design involved a symmetrical main frontage with five bays facing onto the High Street, with the end bays slightly projected forward as pavilions; the central bay featured a doorway with a fanlight flanked by a pair of Doric order columns supporting an entablature, with a sash window on the first floor. The other bays in the central section were fenestrated by round headed windows on the ground floor and by square headed sash windows on the first floor. The outer bays, which featured doorways on the ground floor and sash windows with architraves on the first floor, were surmounted by pediments which contained a clock in the left hand tympanum and an oculus in the right hand tympanum. Internally, the principal rooms were the courtroom, the witness rooms, the sheriff clerk's offices, a records room and several cells for prisoners.

Following the implementation of the Local Government (Scotland) Act 1889, which established county councils in every county, Kinross-shire County Council also established its offices in the building. A war memorial, in the form of a column surmounted by a cross and mounted on a pedestal, which was intended to commemorate the lives of local service personnel who died in the First World War, was unveiled outside the building in the presence of Lord Constable on 1 January 1921. Following the abolition of the county council in 1975, the building was converted for use as a business centre, but it also continued to accommodate the local area offices of Perth and Kinross Council.

== See also ==
- List of listed buildings in Kinross, Perth and Kinross
