= Kinross Town Hall =

Municipal building in Kinross, Scotland

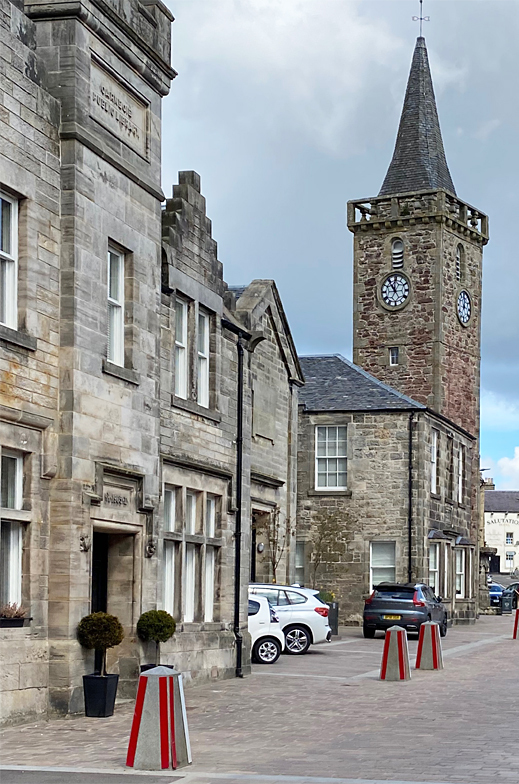
- Kinross High Street, showing the Carnegie library (foreground), the town hall (set back from the street), the post office (projected forward) and the clock tower (behind)

- Shown in Perth and Kinross
- 56.2031°N 3.4212°W
- Location: High Street, Kinross

History
- Built: 1869

Site notes
- Architect: Andrew Cumming
- Architectural style: Neoclassical style

Listed Building – Category B
- Official name: The Clock Tower, High Street
- Designated: 5 October 1971
- Reference no.: LB36297

Listed Building – Category B
- Official name: 108 High Street (Old Post Office)
- Designated: 5 October 1971
- Reference no.: LB36298

Listed Building – Category B
- Official name: 110 High Street, Former Town Hall
- Designated: 5 October 1971
- Reference no.: LB36299

Listed Building – Category B
- Official name: 112 High Street, Carnegie Public Library
- Designated: 10 June 2002
- Reference no.: LB48649

Kinross Town Hall forms part of a complex of municipal buildings in the High Street, Kinross, Perth and Kinross, Scotland. The town hall, which has been converted for residential use, is a Category B listed building.

== History ==
The oldest part of the complex is the four-stage clock tower which is the only surviving part of Kinross Parish Church, a structure which was built in rubble masonry and completed in 1751. In the 1830s, the parishioners decided that they wanted a church in the Perpendicular Gothic style and after a new church in that style was completed in Station Road in 1832, the main block of the old church was demolished leaving only the tower. The tower featured a doorway with a Gibbs surround in the first stage, a round headed window in the second stage, and blind walls in the third and fourth stages, all surmounted by a balustraded parapet and a steeple. A clock and belfry louvre were added later.

In the 1830s, a group of local businessmen decided to form a company known as the "Kinross Market Company" to finance and build two new blocks which were to be attached to the old tower to create a traditional Scottish townhouse. Both blocks were designed in the neoclassical style, built in ashlar stone and were completed in 1841. The first of these was a two-storey block which was used as a post office. The design involved a symmetrical main frontage with three bays facing onto the High Street; the central bay featured a doorway flanked by pilasters supporting an entablature with a blind panel on the first floor. The outer bays were fenestrated by bay windows on the ground floor and by sash windows on the first floor. The second of these was a single-storey block which was remodelled by Andrew Cumming to form a town hall in 1869. Although the design also involved a symmetrical main frontage with three bays facing onto the High Street, it was set further back from the street. The central bay, which was projected forward and gabled, featured a doorway with an architrave and a cornice, with a blind panel above; the outer bays were fenestrated by mullioned and transomed windows.

The complex was completed by a further extension to the south to create a Carnegie library, which was designed by Peter Henderson of Glasgow, built in ashlar stone and completed in 1905. The design involved a symmetrical main frontage with three bays facing onto the High Street; the central bay, which was projected forward, was formed by a three-stage castellated tower, with a doorway with a hood mould in the first stage, a sash window in the second stage and an inscribed commemorative panel in the third stage. The outer bays were fenestrated by mullioned and transomed windows and surmounted by stepped gables.

In 1945, the Kinross Market Company decided to give the building to the burgh as a lasting memorial to the local service personnel who had died in the Second World War; a plaque was attached to the gable of the town hall to commemorate the event.

The town hall continued to serve as the meeting place of the burgh council for much of the 20th century but ceased to be the local seat of government when the enlarged Perth and Kinross District Council was formed in 1975. The complex was then used as a community events venue until 2003, when the council declared the complex surplus to requirements and, after the fabric of the building deteriorated, it was placed on the Buildings at Risk Register for Scotland. After being marketed for sale in 2009, it was acquired by a developer known as "Town Hall Developments". A programme of work to convert the complex into nine residential apartments was undertaken at a cost of £1.5 million and completed in November 2018.

== See also ==
- List of listed buildings in Kinross, Perth and Kinross
