= Dalqueich =

Coordinates: 56.224130°N 3.485327°W

Dalqueich: Scottish Gaelic: Dail Cuaich
- Dalqueich

- Location within Perth and Kinross
- OS grid reference: NO080045
- Council area: Perth and Kinross
- Lieutenancy area: Perth and Kinross
- Country: Scotland
- Sovereign state: United Kingdom
- Post town: KINROSS
- Postcode district: KY13
- Dialling code: 01577
- Police: Scotland
- Fire: Scottish
- Ambulance: Scottish
- UK Parliament: Perth and Kinross-shire
- Scottish Parliament: Ochil

Dalqueich (/dælˈkwiːx/) is a hamlet in Perth and Kinross, Scotland. It lies approximately 3 miles (5 kilometres) west of Kinross, north of the A91 road on the North Queich burn.

Warroch House lies about a mile to the west of Dalqueich. It is about twice the size of Hattonburn House, near Milnathort, both houses having been associated with the Montgomery family for many years.
