= List of listed buildings in Strathmiglo, Fife =

This is a list of listed buildings in the parish of Strathmiglo in Fife, Scotland.

== List ==
Name	Location	Date listed	Grid ref. (Note: Sometimes known as OSGB36, the grid reference (where provided) is based on the British national grid reference system used by the Ordnance Survey. • "Guide to National Grid". Ordnance Survey. • "Get-a-map". Ordnance Survey.)	Geo-coordinates	Notes	LB number (Note: Historic Environment Scotland assign a unique alphanumeric identifier to each designated site in Scotland, for listed buildings this always begins with "LB", for example "LB12345".)	Image
Falkland Estate, Easter Cash Farmhouse With Boundary Walls, Gatepiers And Gates				56°16′13″N 3°14′21″W	Category B	43885	Upload Photo
Pitlour House, Gardens House				56°17′03″N 3°17′01″W	Category B	17435	Upload Photo
Smithy And Smithy House Gateside				56°16′08″N 3°19′05″W	Category C(S)	15794	Upload Photo
Royal Hotel, High Street				56°16′42″N 3°16′08″W	Category B	15752	Upload Photo
28 And 30 High Street With Outbuilding And Garden Walls				56°16′41″N 3°16′09″W	Category B	15760	Upload Photo
32, 34 High Street				56°16′41″N 3°16′10″W	Category C(S)	15761	Upload Photo
22, 24 High Street				56°16′41″N 3°16′08″W	Category C(S)	15758	Upload Photo
Alma House 74 High Street				56°16′39″N 3°16′17″W	Category B	15762	Upload Photo
Pitlour House				56°17′10″N 3°16′45″W	Category A	15768	Upload Photo
Killknowe				56°16′38″N 3°18′09″W	Category C(S)	15790	Upload Photo
27 High Street				56°16′42″N 3°16′06″W	Category C(S)	15751	Upload Photo
Eden Cottage, 26 High Street				56°16′41″N 3°16′09″W	Category C(S)	15759	Upload Photo
Clunie House 89 High Street				56°16′39″N 3°16′19″W	Category B	19755	Upload Photo
Westbank Farmhouse				56°16′30″N 3°16′02″W	Category B	15766	Upload Photo
Strathmiglo Parish Kirk				56°16′41″N 3°16′01″W	Category B	15787	Upload Photo
Gardener's House Of Edenshead (Tod, Tenant Mrs Leaburn, Owner) Gateside				56°16′08″N 3°19′03″W	Category B	15793	Upload Photo
Fernielea, 49 High Street				56°16′41″N 3°16′10″W	Category C(S)	15753	Upload Photo
Wellfield House				56°16′30″N 3°18′07″W	Category B	15789	Upload Photo
Tollhouse, Gateside				56°16′08″N 3°19′05″W	Category B	15792	Upload Photo
Edenshead House, Doocot				56°16′04″N 3°19′06″W	Category B	15796	Upload Photo
West Mill				56°16′35″N 3°16′34″W	Category B	47447	Upload Photo
Pitlour House, West Lodge				56°17′04″N 3°17′07″W	Category B	17436	Upload Photo
Feu Bridge, Town Green				56°16′37″N 3°15′59″W	Category C(S)	15765	Upload Photo
Pitlour House Stables				56°17′15″N 3°16′40″W	Category B	15788	Upload Photo
Strathmiglo Parish Kirk Grave Yard				56°16′40″N 3°15′58″W	Category B	15749	Upload Photo
95 High Street				56°16′39″N 3°16′20″W	Category C(S)	15757	Upload Photo
West Mill, Mill House				56°16′35″N 3°16′33″W	Category C(S)	47446	Upload Photo
Falkland Estate, Easter Cash Farm				56°16′15″N 3°14′23″W	Category B	43884	Upload Photo
Edenshead Church Gateside				56°16′11″N 3°19′10″W	Category C(S)	19757	Upload Photo
Bankwell Bridge Town Green				56°16′36″N 3°16′06″W	Category C(S)	15764	Upload Photo
Gateside Bridge Over Morton Burn				56°16′08″N 3°19′05″W	Category C(S)	15791	Upload Photo
Edenshead House				56°16′04″N 3°19′05″W	Category C(S)	15795	Upload Photo
Strathmiglo Manse				56°16′41″N 3°16′03″W	Category C(S)	15750	Upload Photo
91 High Street				56°16′39″N 3°16′20″W	Category B	17434	Upload Photo
Croft House And Shop, 80 And 80A High Street				56°16′39″N 3°16′18″W	Category C(S)	15763	Upload Photo
Pitlour South Lodge				56°16′57″N 3°16′01″W	Category B	15767	Upload Photo
Town Hall Steeple				56°16′41″N 3°16′10″W	Category A	15754	Upload another image
59 High Street				56°16′41″N 3°16′13″W	Category C(S)	15755	Upload Photo
Stratheden Hotel High Street				56°16′41″N 3°16′14″W	Category C(S)	15756	Upload Photo
Ice House, Pitlour House, Strathmiglo				56°17′13″N 3°16′52″W	Category C(S)	52212	Upload Photo
Water House, Pitlour House, Strathmiglo				56°17′19″N 3°17′27″W	Category C(S)	52213	Upload Photo
1-12 Thomson’s Mill, excluding interior, boundary walls, archway and two-storey building (Skene Works) to west, Skene Street, Strathmiglo				56°16′31″N 3°16′13″W	Category C(S)	52540	Upload Photo

== Key ==
The scheme for classifying buildings in Scotland is:

- Category A: "buildings of national or international importance, either architectural or historic; or fine, little-altered examples of some particular period, style or building type."
- Category B: "buildings of regional or more than local importance; or major examples of some particular period, style or building type, which may have been altered."
- Category C: "buildings of local importance; lesser examples of any period, style, or building type, as originally constructed or moderately altered; and simple traditional buildings which group well with other listed buildings."

In March 2016 there were 47,288 listed buildings in Scotland. Of these, 8% were Category A, and 50% were Category B, with the remaining 42% being Category C.

== See also ==
- List of listed buildings in Fife
