= Milnathort Town Hall =

Municipal building in Milnathort, Scotland

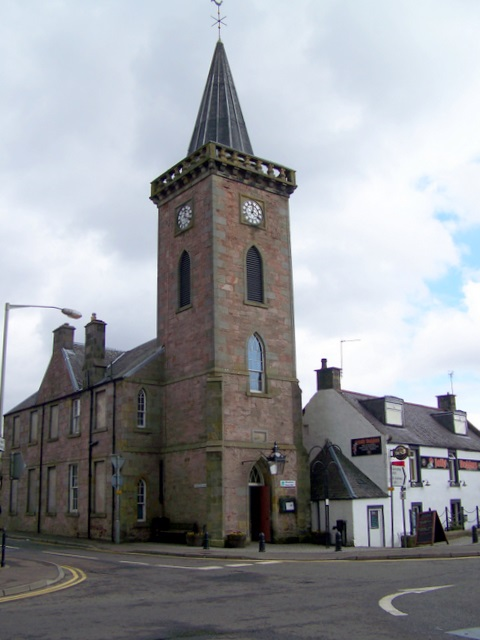
- Milnathort Town Hall

- Shown in Perth and Kinross
- 56.2269°N 3.4199°W
- Location: New Road, Milnathort

History
- Built: 1855

Site notes
- Architect: Mr Watt
- Architectural style: Gothic Revival style

Listed Building – Category B
- Official name: Town Hall, Milnathort
- Designated: 5 October 1971
- Reference no.: LB17638

Milnathort Town Hall is a municipal building in New Road, Milnathort, Perth and Kinross, Scotland. The structure, which is currently used as community events venue, is a Category B listed building.

== History ==
The building was commissioned by Orwell Parish Council as a cattle exchange for local farmers and as a market house for the parishioners. The site that the parish council chose for the building, on the north side of New Road, straddled a stream, the "Back Burn". The architectural historian, John Gifford, has suggested that "its 17th century-style steeple and its dominant central position" were indicative of the parish council's desire for Milnathort "to be thought a burgh".

The building was designed by a Mr Watt of Kinross, built in rubble masonry and was completed in 1855. The design involved a symmetrical main frontage with five bays facing onto Wester Loan. The building, which was laid out as rectangular block, was fenestrated with sash windows on both floors with a pediment over the central three bays. The block was accessed from the south end. Internally, the principal room was the main assembly hall which occupied much of the building and was described as "large and lofty". A police station, to accommodate the office of the local police constable as well as two cells for prisoners, was established at the rear of the building.

The building was extended, by the addition of a three-stage tower at the south end, shortly after it was built and certainly by 1877. The tower, which was designed in the Gothic Revival style, involved an arched doorway with a fanlight and voussoirs in the first stage, an arched window with tracery and voussoirs in the second stage, and a louvred opening with voussoirs as well as a set of clock faces in the third stage. The tower was surmounted by a balustraded parapet, a spire and a weather vane. An elaborate rinceau decoration scheme was introduced as part of the celebrations for the Diamond Jubilee of Queen Victoria in 1887.

The building continued to serve as a community events venue throughout the remainder of the 19th century, the whole of the 20th century and into the 21st century: in addition to cèilidhs and other local social events, the building was used for book launches and other public meetings.

By the early 21st century had become dilapidated. The local authority, Perth and Kinross Council, agreed to lease the building to a local management committee. An extensive programme of refurbishment works costing £200,000 started on site in summer 2015. The works, which were financed by a group of local charities including Arthur & Margaret Thompson's Charitable Trust, the Gannochy Trust, and the Kinross-shire Fund, involved the installation of under-floor heating and the replacement of the fittings in the kitchen and were completed in March 2016. The refurbishment also enabled an offshoot of the management committee, Milnathort Filmhouse, to resume showing films in the main assembly hall.

== See also ==
- List of listed buildings in Orwell, Perth and Kinross
