= Cramock Burn =

Ancient watercourse in Scotland

- Location of Cramock Burn in Scotland

Location
- Country: Scotland
- County: Perth and Kinross
- Towns: Scone

Physical characteristics
- Source
  - coordinates: 56°25′44″N 3°23′52″W
- Mouth: River Tay
  - location: Scone
  - coordinates: 56°25′36″N 3°27′39″W
- Length: 2.7 mi (4.3 km)

Basin features
- River system: River Tay

Cramock Burn is an historic 2.7 mi (4.3 km)-long watercourse in Scone, Perth and Kinross, Scotland. It is a tributary of the River Tay, which it joins just north of where the River Almond flows into the Tay, on the Perth side of the river. On an 1804 estate map, it is described as a "small sluggish stream".

== Course ==
The burn is sourced from a spring just north of New Scone and northeast of an area known in the early 19th century as Spoutwells. From there, it flows west and passes under an unnamed road. Shortly thereafter, still continuing west, almost parallel with Gelly Burn, around 0.5 miles (0.80 km) to the north, it passes beneath the A93 to the northeast of Old Scone. Turning slightly south, it passes beneath Stormontfield Road before flowing past the northern edge of Perth Racecourse. Around 0.45 miles (0.72 km) later, it empties into the River Tay near Garragie Bank.

An 1886 Gardeners' Chronicle article described the burn as passing Balboughty Farm.

== Flooding concern ==
In 2019, concerns from residents were raised that groundwater and drainage from the Cross Tay Link Road would cause the burn to overflow.
