= Duncrievie =

Coordinates: 56.268275°N 3.398227°W

Duncrievie: Scottish Gaelic: Dùn Chraobhach
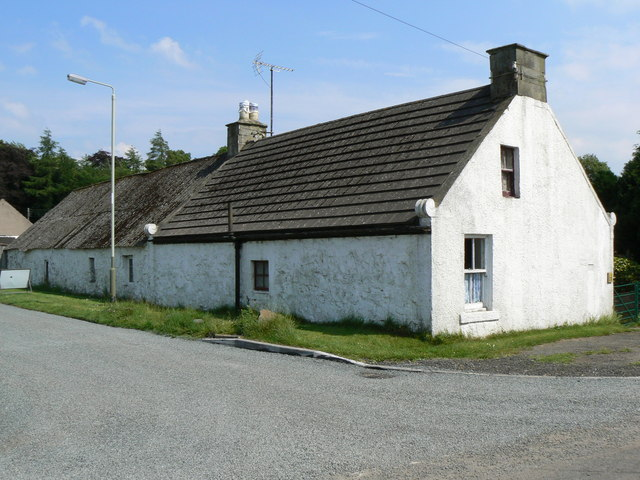
- Cottages in Duncrievie

- Location within Perth and Kinross
- OS grid reference: NO135093
- Council area: Perth and Kinross
- Lieutenancy area: Perth and Kinross
- Country: Scotland
- Sovereign state: United Kingdom
- Post town: KINROSS
- Postcode district: KY13
- Dialling code: 01577
- Police: Scotland
- Fire: Scottish
- Ambulance: Scottish
- UK Parliament: Perth and Kinross-shire
- Scottish Parliament: Ochil

Duncrievie (/dʌnˈkriːvi/) is a village in Perth and Kinross, Scotland. It lies approximately 6 miles (10 kilometres) north of Kinross, to the west of the M90 motorway, 1 mile (1.5 kilometres) south of Glenfarg.
