= Kinnesswood =

Village in Perth and Kinross, Scotland

Coordinates: 56.210623°N 3.330023°W

Kinnesswood: Scots: Kinaskit
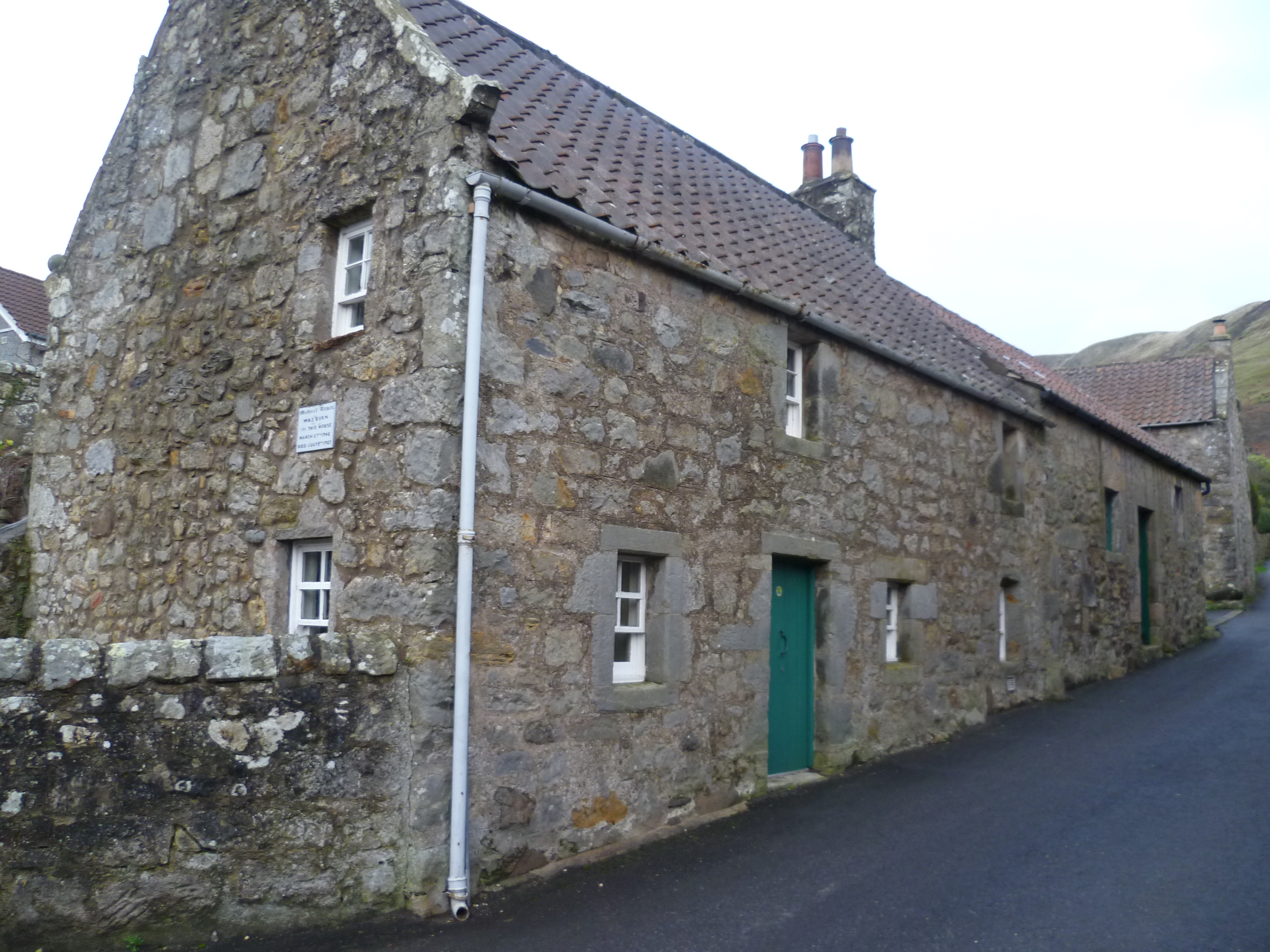
- Birthplace of Poet Michael Bruce in Kinnesswood

- Location within Perth and Kinross
- Population: 540 (2020)
- OS grid reference: NO176028
- Council area: Perth and Kinross
- Lieutenancy area: Perth and Kinross
- Country: Scotland
- Sovereign state: United Kingdom
- Post town: KINROSS
- Postcode district: KY13
- Dialling code: 01592
- Police: Scotland
- Fire: Scottish
- Ambulance: Scottish
- UK Parliament: Perth and Kinross-shire
- Scottish Parliament: Ochil

Kinnesswood (Scots: Kinaskit,), possibly from the Scottish Gaelic: Ceann Eas Ciad ("head of the waterfall of the wood") but more likely from Scottish Gaelic: Ceann Easg "boggy head" together with "wood" from English or "cot" (cottage) from Scots is a village in Perth and Kinross, Scotland, and is in the historic county of Kinross-shire. It lies to the east of Loch Leven, on the A911 road, below Bishop Hill in the Lomond Hills. It is approximately 4 miles (6 kilometres) west of Glenrothes and 4 miles (6 kilometres) east of Kinross.

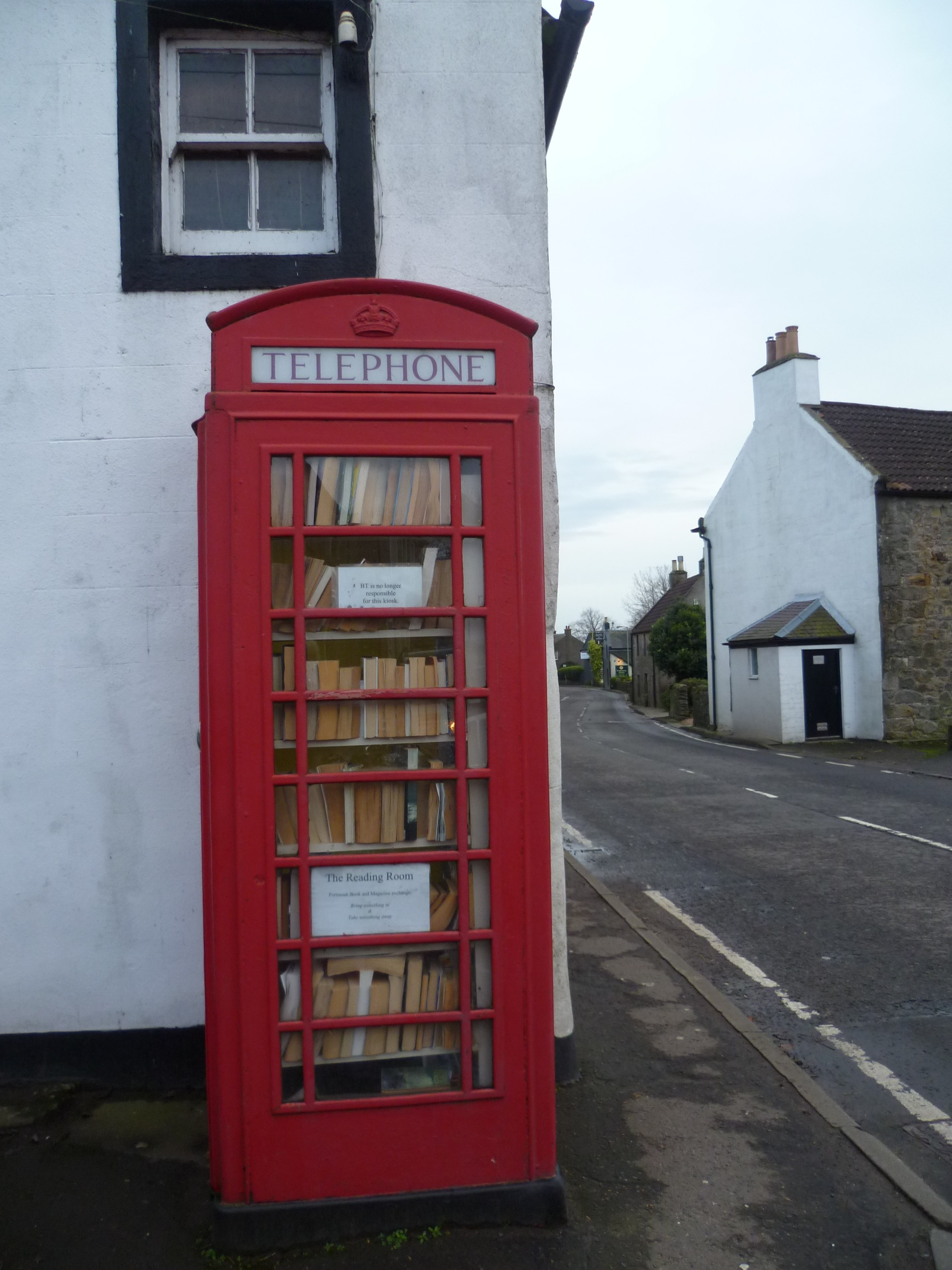
Disused 'phone box used as a second hand book exchange

== Notable residents ==
It was the birthplace in 1746 of the poet Michael Bruce who was born into a weaver's family and is remembered for his nature poetry in poems such as 'Ode To The Cuckoo' which Edmund Burke described as "the most beautiful lyric in our language". Bruce died from consumption at the early age of 21.

In 1829 meteorologist Alexander Buchan was born here.
