= Scotlandwell =

Coordinates: 56.200017°N 3.313538°W

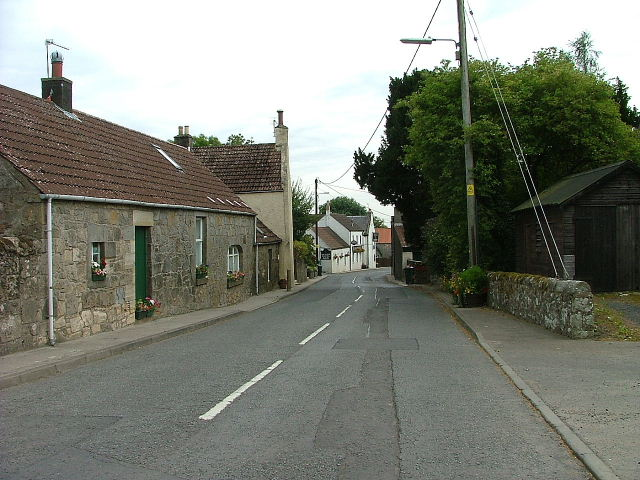
- Scotlandwell

- Location within Perth and Kinross
- OS grid reference: NO186016
- Council area: Perth and Kinross
- Lieutenancy area: Perth and Kinross
- Country: Scotland
- Sovereign state: United Kingdom
- Post town: KINROSS
- Postcode district: KY13
- Dialling code: 01592
- Police: Scotland
- Fire: Scottish
- Ambulance: Scottish
- UK Parliament: Perth and Kinross-shire
- Scottish Parliament: Ochil

Scotlandwell is a village in Portmoak, Kinross-shire, Scotland. It is within the Perth and Kinross council area. It lies to the east of Loch Leven, at the junction of the A977 and B920 roads, approximately 4 miles (6 kilometres) west of Glenrothes and 4 miles (6 kilometres) east of Kinross.

Scotlandwell is one of the historic sites of Kinross-shire. Named Fons Scotiae by the Romans who founded it nearly 2,000 years ago, the curative waters that bubble up through the sandy ground were used by Red Friars, who maintained a hospital in the village between 1250 and 1587.

Thousands of pilgrims came to Scotlandwell to take the water, the most famous perhaps being King Robert the Bruce, who is alleged to have found a cure for leprosy here.

The two main historical features of Scotlandwell village are the Well and Wash House.

== The Well and Wash House ==
The building of the ornamental well and wash house in Scotlandwell in more recent times was undertaken as part of a general scheme of village improvement carried out between 1857 and 1860 by Thomas Bruce of Arnot. A direct descendant of Sir William Bruce, the architect of Kinross House, Thomas Bruce was the feudal superior of the old Barony of Arnot which included the village of Scotlandwell as its principal settlement.

In 1822 a small piece of common ground, situated by the main street and known locally as the Peat Hill, was divided up amongst the feuars of the village.

The spot where the well now stands was then described as being "an almost unapproachable slough of mire and filth" beside which stood "a half ruinous building sometimes used as a washing house and sometimes as a slaughterhouse."

Thomas Bruce, who eventually acquired all of this land, commissioned the well. In 1857 the plan for an ornamental fountain or well was prepared by the Edinburgh architect David Bryce (1803–76). Bryce also designed the wash house opposite. Using stone from quarries at Greenhead of Arnot and Nivingston near Cleish, the well was completed in 1858 at a cost of £154.

The village improvement scheme, which also included the upgrading of many cottages, was completed in 1860 with the building of the wash house at a cost of £117. In addition to land being cleared to create a bleach field, an ornamental garden with exotic trees was laid out for the benefit of villagers between the wash house and the main street. For many years a tearoom stood on this site. The wash house bears not only the date 1860 but also the initials TBA for Thomas Bruce of Arnot who commented on the whole scheme once the well and wash house had been completed:

"The improvement of the village and of its "Well" has cost me more money than some might perhaps say I aught to have expended upon them, but it has been a subject of great interest to me and I have been far more than repaid in one way at least by the gratification it has afforded to the villagers by a desire for whose moral improvement it was that I was mainly actuated in what I did and am still doing."

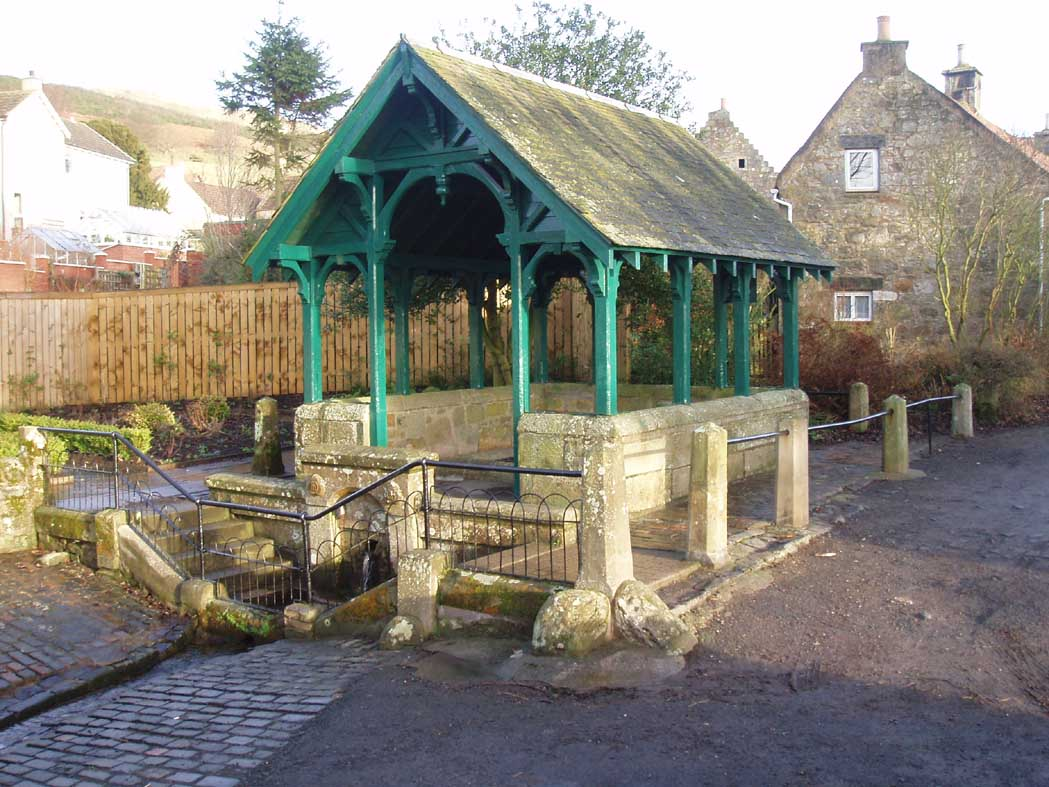
The Well

Two years after the death of Sir Charles Bruce of Arnot in 1922, the well, wash house, garden and bleach field were handed over to the people of Scotlandwell as a gift. Thereafter, the local Parish Council whose powers were eventually devolved to Kinross County Council maintained the site and its historic buildings.

The well and nearby wash house are both in need of upkeep and repair. While the well itself needs to be cleaned and minor structural attention, the wash house is deteriorating.

== Sources ==
- Scottish Record Office, Bruce of Arnot Papers (GD 242).
- Plan of Division of Scotlandwell Peat Hill Ebenezer Birrell, surveyor 1821, (Kinross-shire Antiquarian Society).
- Rev. J.P.J. Gordon The Ecclesiastical Chronicle for Scotland, Glasgow, 1875.
- D.Mackenzie Munro 'The Red Friars of Scotlandwell' in the Kinross Advertiser, 30 Aug. 1969.
- Kinross Museum 108-110 High Street Kinross KY13 7DA
