= Bein Inn =

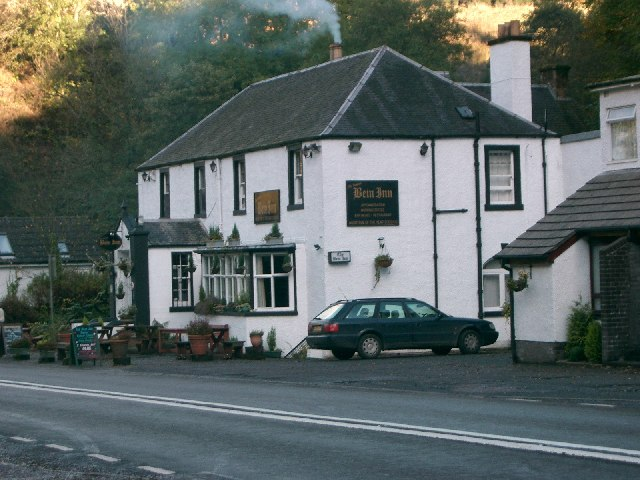
- The inn in 2005, looking southeast along the B996
- Interactive map of the Bein Inn area
- Alternative names: Famous Bein Inn

General information
- Type: Inn and restaurant
- Location: Glenfarg, Perth and Kinross, Scotland
- Coordinates: 56.30253910°N 3.35879836°W
- Elevation: 305 feet (93 m)

Height
- Roof: Slate

Technical details
- Floor count: 2

The Bein Inn (commonly known as the Famous Bein Inn) is an historic building in Glenfarg, Perth and Kinross, Scotland. A "noted hostelry," according to the Gazetteer for Scotland, it was originally built in the 19th century as a resting place for travellers moving between Edinburgh and the Highlands on the old Great North Road, the traditional route north, today's A912 road. It stands at the junction of the A912 and the B996.

An original building, now known as Bein Cottage, across the old Great North Road from the main inn, is no longer part of the inn. The inn has been extended on its western side, along the B996.

In 1983, the inn had eighteen bedrooms.

In the early 2000s, the inn was a noted venue for live rock music.

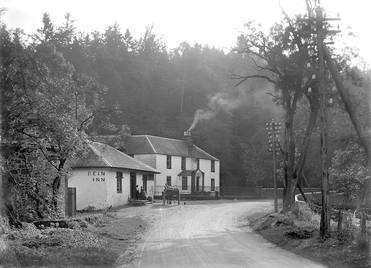
The inn in 1905, looking west along the B996. The building closest to the camera, at the corner of the old Great North Road, is no longer part of the inn
