= Strathmiglo Town House =

Municipal building in Strathmiglo, Scotland

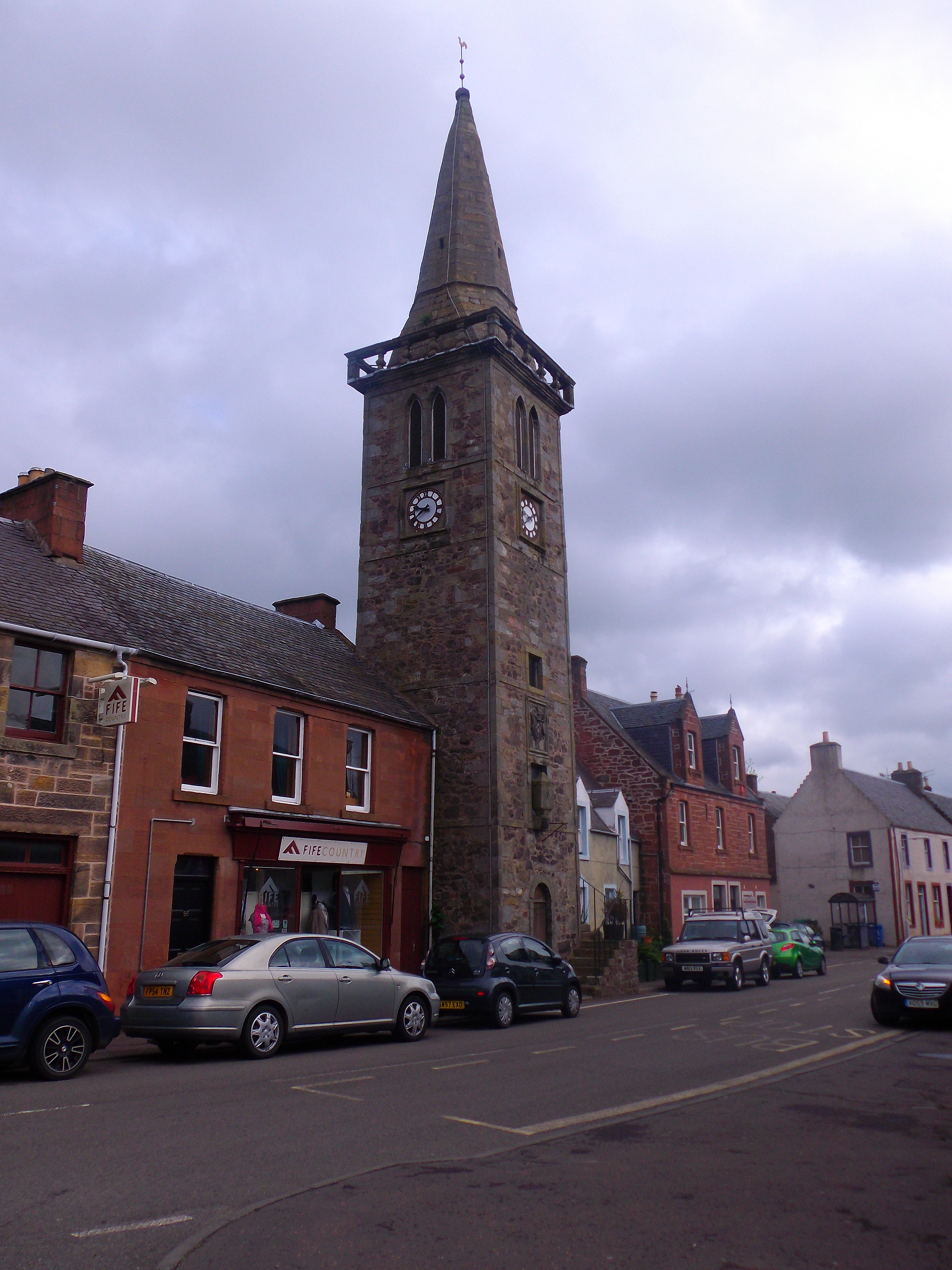
- Strathmiglo Town House

- Shown in Fife
- 56.2781°N 3.2695°W
- Location: High Street, Strathmiglo

History
- Built: 1734

Site notes
- Architectural style: Scottish medieval style

Listed Building – Category A
- Official name: Town Hall Steeple
- Designated: 17 October 1973
- Reference no.: LB15754

Strathmiglo Town House is a municipal structure in the High Street, Strathmiglo, Fife, Scotland. The structure, which is now disused, is a Category A listed building.

== History ==
The first municipal building in Strathmiglo was a medieval tolbooth, on the north side of the High Street just to the west of the junction with Kirk Wynd, which dated back at least to the 16th century.

The current tower was commissioned as an extension to the south end of a public hall which was acquired by the burgh council for use as a town house in 1730. The design of the original hall involved a narrow main frontage facing the High Street which surmounted by a stepped gable with skewputts at the tips. The new tower was designed in the Scottish medieval style, built in rubble masonry and was completed in 1734. The stones for the tower were taken from Stathmiglo Castle with permission from the local feudal lady, Margaret Balfour (died 1769). (Note: Margaret Balfour was the sister of Robert Balfour, 5th Lord Balfour of Burleigh, who was attainted and had his peerage forfeited during the Jacobite rising of 1715.)

The tower, which was 70 feet (21 m) high, involved was a round headed doorway in the first stage, a sundial with a pyramid-shaped cap and a panel bearing the coat of arms of Margaret Balfour in the second stage, a small window in the third stage, a set of clock faces in the fourth stage and a belfry with lancet windows in the fifth stage. The whole structure was surmounted by a balustrade, a spire and a weather vane. There was an external staircase on the east side of the tower leading to a doorway at first floor level which gave access, through the tower, to the main hall. A bell, cast by Lester and Pack, was installed in the belfry in 1766. Internally, the principal rooms were the prison cell on the ground floor of the tower and the main hall which was located behind the tower.

After the burgh was abolished in 1748, the structure was mainly used as a community events venue. The main hall was rebuilt in the mid-19th century and, in the 20th century, it was converted for use as a private residence and integrated into an adjacent property known as "The Clock House". Fife Council initiated some refurbishment work on the stonework of the tower itself, which remains in local authority ownership and is disused, in 2014.

== See also ==
- List of listed buildings in Strathmiglo, Fife
- List of Category A listed buildings in Fife
