= List of listed buildings in Orwell, Perth and Kinross =

This is a list of listed buildings in the parish of Orwell in Perth and Kinross, Scotland.

== List ==
Name	Location	Date Listed	Grid Ref. (Note: Sometimes known as OSGB36, the grid reference (where provided) is based on the British national grid reference system used by the Ordnance Survey. • "Guide to National Grid". Ordnance Survey. • "Get-a-map". Ordnance Survey.)	Geo-coordinates	Notes	LB Number (Note: Historic Environment Scotland assign a unique alphanumeric identifier to each designated site in Scotland, for listed buildings this always begins with "LB", for example "LB12345".)	Image
Hattonburn House				56°14′06″N 3°24′35″W	Category C(S)	19812	Upload Photo
Burleigh Farm				56°13′31″N 3°24′21″W	Category B	19054	Upload Photo
Store (Old Free Church) Old Perth Road				56°13′41″N 3°25′00″W	Category C(S)	17634	Upload Photo
Milnathort 13 Manse Road				56°13′45″N 3°25′17″W	Category C(S)	17635	Upload Photo
The Cross, Town Hall				56°13′37″N 3°25′12″W	Category B	17638	Upload another image
8-10 Back Loan				56°13′38″N 3°25′09″W	Category B	17639	Upload Photo
South Street Former Milnathort Parish Church With Church Hall, Retaining Walls, Gatepiers And Gates				56°13′34″N 3°25′15″W	Category B	17656	Upload Photo
20-26 Wester Loan				56°13′40″N 3°25′11″W	Category C(S)	19810	Upload Photo
Orwell Parish Kirk				56°13′11″N 3°22′39″W	Category B	17632	Upload Photo
Collieston Farm-House And Steadings				56°15′43″N 3°23′47″W	Category B	17650	Upload Photo
Burleigh Castle				56°13′33″N 3°24′23″W	Category A	17654	Upload another image
Horn Of Thomanean Mausoleum Old Orwell Kirkyard				56°13′11″N 3°22′38″W	Category C(S)	17655	Upload Photo
Ballingall Farm, New House				56°13′33″N 3°26′49″W	Category B	19261	Upload Photo
Old Holton Farmhouse				56°14′33″N 3°25′44″W	Category B	17649	Upload Photo
Milnathort, 2, 4 And 6 South Street				56°13′36″N 3°25′13″W	Category C(S)	49531	Upload Photo
Hattonburn House, Former Coach House				56°14′08″N 3°24′39″W	Category C(S)	43208	Upload Photo
Thomanean Barn, Horsemill And Cartsheds				56°13′16″N 3°28′00″W	Category C(S)	19811	Upload Photo
Mill House 2 Stirling Road				56°13′37″N 3°25′16″W	Category C(S)	17644	Upload Photo
Hilton House				56°13′30″N 3°26′18″W	Category B	17645	Upload Photo
Milnathort, South Street, Royal Hotel Including Ancillary Structures				56°13′35″N 3°25′14″W	Category B	49532	Upload Photo
Cottage At Finderlie				56°13′42″N 3°27′46″W	Category C(S)	19473	Upload Photo
Ballingall Farm, Old House And Steading				56°13′33″N 3°26′47″W	Category B	19260	Upload Photo
Orwell House (Old Orwell Manse) Manse Road				56°13′46″N 3°25′20″W	Category B	17633	Upload Photo
9 Back Loan				56°13′38″N 3°25′09″W	Category C(S)	17640	Upload Photo
5-7 Back Loan				56°13′38″N 3°25′15″W	Category C(S)	17641	Upload Photo
Cross Keys Inn 34-36 Wester Loan				56°13′41″N 3°25′11″W	Category C(S)	17643	Upload Photo
Arlary House				56°14′06″N 3°23′29″W	Category B	17652	Upload Photo
3 Back Loan				56°13′38″N 3°25′10″W	Category C(S)	17642	Upload Photo
Finderly Farm				56°13′46″N 3°27′52″W	Category C(S)	17648	Upload Photo
21-23 New Road				56°13′38″N 3°25′07″W	Category C(S)	17637	Upload Photo
Shanwell House				56°13′41″N 3°29′08″W	Category B	17647	Upload Photo
Drunzie Farm-House And Steadings				56°15′44″N 3°23′17″W	Category B	17651	Upload Photo
1 Perth Road (Thornton House)				56°13′39″N 3°24′58″W	Category B	17636	Upload Photo
Dalqueich Bridge Over North Queich River				56°13′31″N 3°29′07″W	Category C(S)	17646	Upload Photo
Arlary Farm Steading - Cartshed And Horse Mill Only				56°14′01″N 3°23′18″W	Category C(S)	17653	Upload Photo

== Key ==
The scheme for classifying buildings in Scotland is:

- Category A: "buildings of national or international importance, either architectural or historic; or fine, little-altered examples of some particular period, style or building type."
- Category B: "buildings of regional or more than local importance; or major examples of some particular period, style or building type, which may have been altered."
- Category C: "buildings of local importance; lesser examples of any period, style, or building type, as originally constructed or moderately altered; and simple traditional buildings which group well with other listed buildings."

In March 2016 there were 47,288 listed buildings in Scotland. Of these, 8% were Category A, and 50% were Category B, with the remaining 42% being Category C.
