= Aberargie =

Coordinates: 56.327159°N 3.355097°W

Aberargie: Scottish Gaelic: Obar Fheargaidh
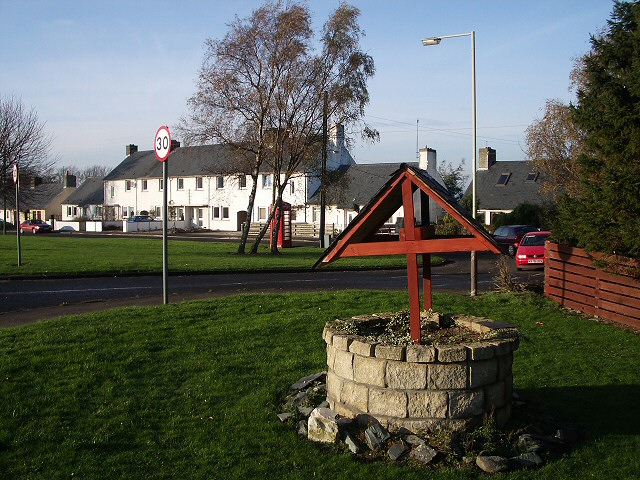
- Nethermill Cottages, Aberargie

- Location within Perth and Kinross
- OS grid reference: NO163158
- Council area: Perth and Kinross
- Lieutenancy area: Perth and Kinross
- Country: Scotland
- Sovereign state: United Kingdom
- Post town: PERTH
- Postcode district: PH2
- Dialling code: 01738
- Police: Scotland
- Fire: Scottish
- Ambulance: Scottish
- UK Parliament: Perth and Kinross-shire
- Scottish Parliament: Perthshire South and Kinross-shire

Aberargie (Scottish Gaelic: Obar Fheargaidh, lit. 'Mouth of [the River] Farg') is a village in the south eastern region of Perth and Kinross and the historic county of Perthshire.

It lies on the western edge of the Abernethy civil parish on the banks of the River Farg, from which it derives its name. Aberargie is around 2.5 kilometres (1 1/2 miles) west of Abernethy, and 3.5 kilometres (2 1/4 miles) southeast of Bridge of Earn.

== History ==
Aberargie, historically also Aberdargie, is recorded in the Pictish Chronicle as part of Nechtan's land grant in 460AD, and may have been in existence for much longer. Archaeological surface finds from fields in the vicinity of the village range from neolithic flints, to the full range of Scottish Medieval Pottery and flintlock rifle/pistol flints, further indicating an extensive period of settlement and activity in the area.

From the middle of the 15th century, Aberargie utilised the River Farg to power water mills for various purposes from sawing timber to the milling of flax and meal. Mills have been recorded at Pottie (corn mill), part of which still stands at the bottom of the Farg Glen, Ayton Farm (corn mill and flax mill), Mill House (corn mill), and Willow Bank, which also has some standing ruins of the saw mill which operated there. Nearby Culfargie, of which the corn mill at Ayton was also a part, had a waulkmill until 1760, when it was replaced with an oil mill. The feu duty for Aberargie mill up until the late 19th century was payable to Balmerino Abbey Estates. The mills had all ceased production by the early 20th century, and the most complete, at Mill House, was demolished in the 1950s after ceasing to operate as a mill in 1912.

== Aberargie Today ==
Aberargie is represented by Abernethy and District community council. The local authority is Perth and Kinross Council with Abernethy falling within the Almond and Earn ward, one of twelve in the council area.

The village is located near the M90 motorway, sitting on the A913 road, connecting to Abernethy and Cupar to the east and onward through the A912 to Perth and Bridge of Earn in the north and Glenfarg and Gateside to the south. There is a bus service to nearby towns.

In 2017, Aberargie joined the list of whisky distilleries in Scotland when the Aberargie Distillery produced its first single malt whisky. Marketed as a ‘barley to bottle’ whisky, all of the barley required for producing the spirit is grown on a 300-acre farm in Aberargie where the distillery and bottling plant are located.
