= Middleton, Perth and Kinross =

Coordinates: 56.244703°N 3.416732°W

Middleton: Scottish Gaelic: Am Baile Meadhanach
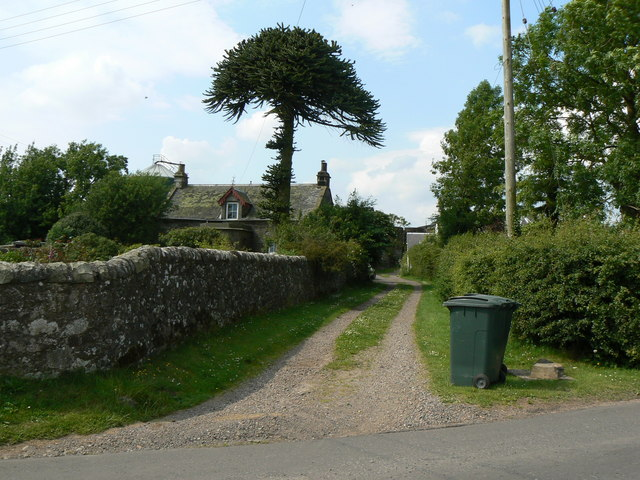
- Village street in Middleton

- Location within Perth and Kinross
- OS grid reference: NO123067
- Council area: Perth and Kinross
- Lieutenancy area: Perth and Kinross
- Country: Scotland
- Sovereign state: United Kingdom
- Post town: KINROSS
- Postcode district: KY13
- Dialling code: 01577
- Police: Scotland
- Fire: Scottish
- Ambulance: Scottish
- UK Parliament: Perth and Kinross-shire
- Scottish Parliament: Ochil

Middleton is a hamlet and farmstead in Perth and Kinross, Scotland. It lies approximately 3 miles (5 kilometres) north of Kinross, to the west of the M90 motorway.
