= Cross Tay Link Road =

Road in Perth and Kinross, Scotland

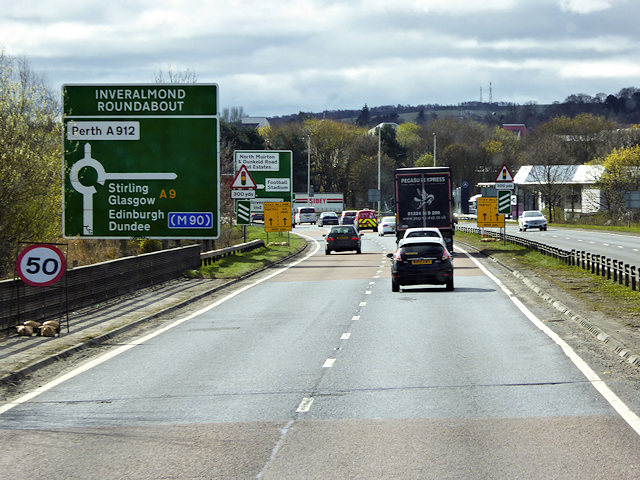
The link road connects to this section of the A9, north of the Inveralmond Roundabout

The Cross Tay Link Road is a road in Perth and Kinross, Scotland. It links the A93 and A94 roads, near Scone, to the A9 north of the Inveralmond Roundabout, at Perth, via a stretch of road, 3.7 miles (6.0 km) long. It includes the three-span Destiny Bridge over Scotland's longest river, the Tay, hence the road's name. A cycle path runs parallel to the bridge's carriageway.

The project, which was expected to cost £118 million, was the second phase of the Perth Transport Futures Project, which was formed to "address the key issues identified in the Perth Traffic and Transport Issues Scottish Transport Appraisal Guidance".

Perth & Kinross Council (PKC) stated that the project would "unlock key development land".

The road opened in March 2025.

== Study ==
Location of the Inveralmond Roundabout in Perth and Kinross

A 2010 study predicted that traffic increases would exceed Perth's capacity, while also highlighting physical limitations caused by local geography (such as Kinnoull Hill and the River Tay) and existing infrastructure (such as the Highland Main Line railway). An assessment, completed in 2016, selected a corridor to the north of the city that should be taken into consideration for the purpose of traffic remediation. The route was approved at a meeting of Perth and Kinross Council (PKC) in December 2016.

It is the first major road project in the vicinity of Perth since the construction of the Friarton Bridge, which was completed in 1978, and the largest to date.

== Objective ==
According to Sweco, the Swedish engineering consultation company, the project will help reduce traffic congestion in Perth's city centre, particularly on the A989 (the city's Inner Ring Road) and in Bridgend, on the eastern side of the River Tay. It is also expected to promote sustainable travel.

== Environmental impact ==
Sweco acknowledges that the construction methods that are necessary in all facets of the project pose environmental risks. As a result, the construction process will be an important part of the environmental impact assessment.

Opponents of the project, in particular the residents of Scone, believe it will have a "devastating impact" on the countryside.

Ramblers and the Scottish Rights of Way and Access Society voiced disapproval that several core paths will be closed during the construction process.

The ecology at the Highfield Plantation Woodland, north of Scone, was given its own "green bridge" to safely cross the new construction.

Concern was expressed at the predicted increase in traffic through local villages. Two months after the road's opening, resident complained that, due to poor signage, more heavy goods vehicles than ever were using the road.

== Timeline ==
The proposed start date of the project was late 2021, with an expected completion date of 2024; preparatory work did not begin until late January 2022, however.

In June 2022, it was announced that a 50-mile-per-hour (80 km/h) speed limit would be in place on a four-mile stretch of the A9 for eighteen months.

A further increase in costs was approved by PKC councillors in September 2022.

Surrey-based BAM Nuttall were appointed the contractors for the project in 2021.

John Swinney, the local MSP and First Minister of Scotland, visited the project site in August 2024; at this time the Destiny Bridge over the Tay was nearing completion.

The road opened in March 2025.
