= Perth Racecourse =

Horse racing venue in Perth, Scotland

Coordinates: 56°25′33.88″N 3°26′56.15″W

Perth
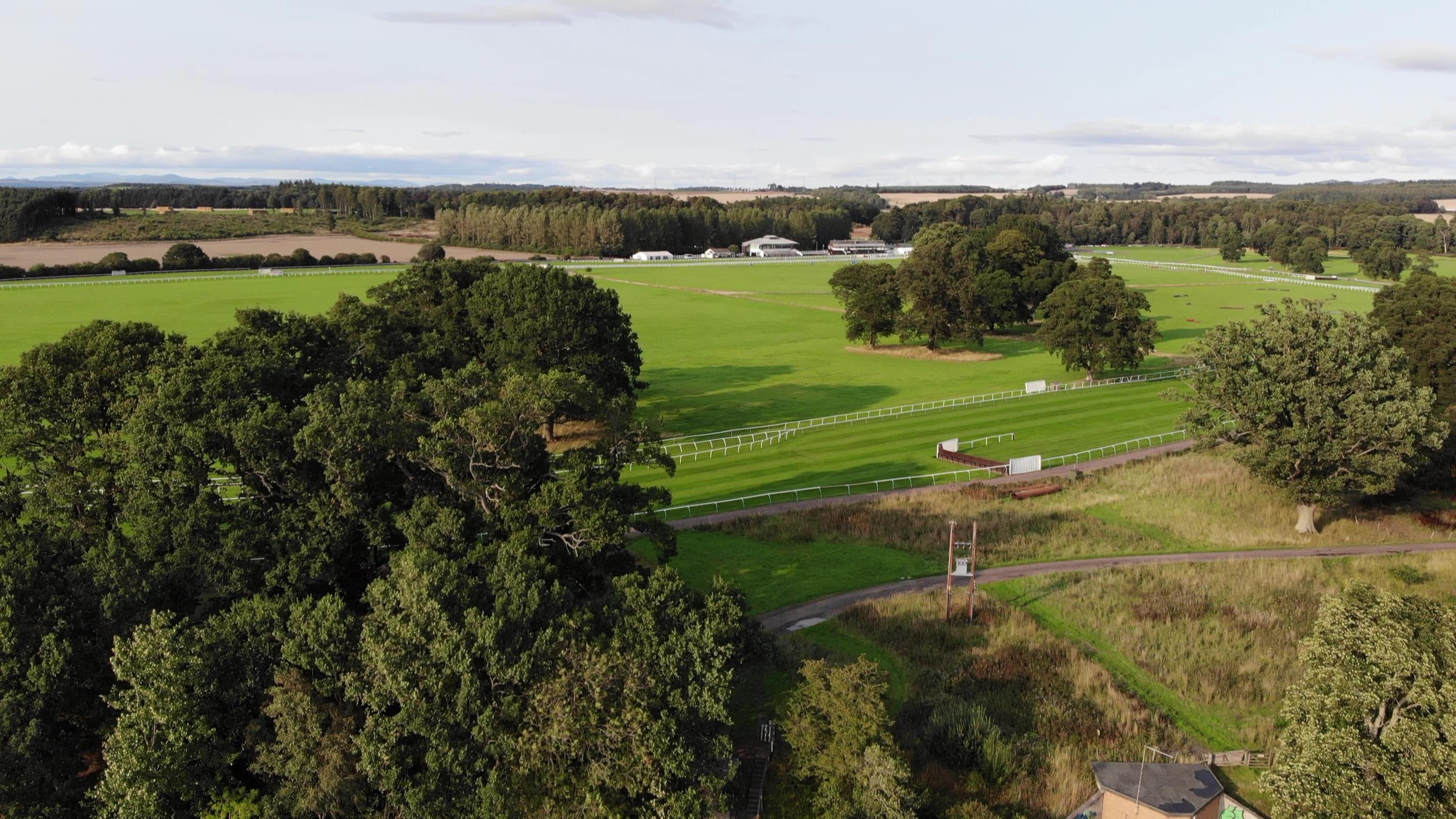
- Interactive map of Perth
- Location: Perth, Scotland
- Date opened: 1908
- Screened on: Racing TV
- Course type: National Hunt
- Notable races: Gold Castle Novices' Hurdle; Fair Maid Of Perth Mares' Chase; Highland National; Perth Gold Cup

Perth Racecourse is a thoroughbred horse racing venue adjacent to the ancient Scone Palace, near Perth, Scotland.

Perth Racecourse at the site in Scone Palace Parklands opened in 1908, just south of the ancient Cramock Burn, and is the northernmost track in Britain. However, horse racing in Perth has taken place since 1613 and was moved to Scone Palace due to a drinking law ban in the North Inch park. Lord Mansfield subsequently offered his land for the construction of a racecourse.

The course is right-handed and ten furlongs in circumference. The steeplechase course consists of eight fences per circuit, with the water jump situated in front of the grandstand. The hurdle course is located on the inside going away from the stands, but switches to the outside of the chase course turning into the home straight.

== Gallery ==
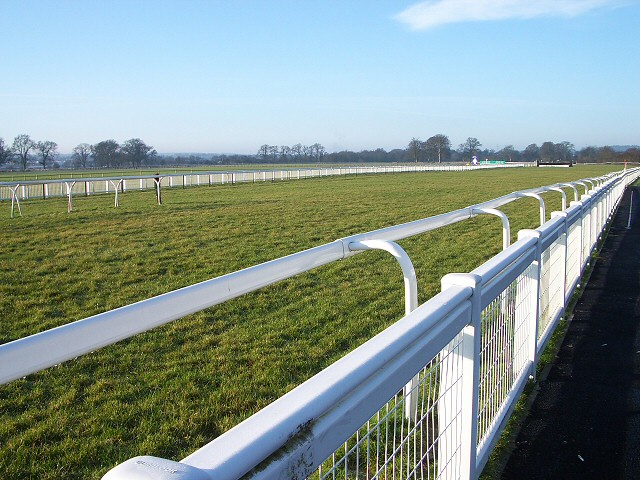
The home straight

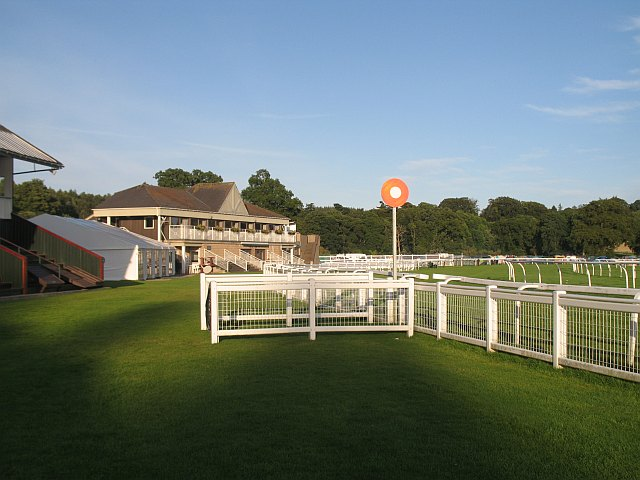
The winning post
