= List of listed buildings in Kinross, Perth and Kinross =

This is a list of listed buildings in the parish of Kinross in Perth and Kinross, Scotland.

== List ==
Name	Location	Date Listed	Grid Ref. (Note: Sometimes known as OSGB36, the grid reference (where provided) is based on the British national grid reference system used by the Ordnance Survey. • "Guide to National Grid". Ordnance Survey. • "Get-a-map". Ordnance Survey.)	Geo-coordinates	Notes	LB Number (Note: Historic Environment Scotland assign a unique alphanumeric identifier to each designated site in Scotland, for listed buildings this always begins with "LB", for example "LB12345".)	Image
Kirkland's Hotel 20 High Street				56°12′21″N 3°25′20″W	Category B	36284	Upload Photo
Clydesdale Bank 37 High Street				56°12′22″N 3°25′17″W	Category B	36289	Upload Photo
Salutation Inn, 99 High Street				56°12′15″N 3°25′15″W	Category B	36290	Upload Photo
3 And 5 School Wynd				56°12′13″N 3°25′18″W	Category B	36292	Upload Photo
108 High Street (Old Post Office)				56°12′11″N 3°25′16″W	Category B	36298	Upload Photo
Kinross House				56°12′11″N 3°24′35″W	Category A	11200	Upload another image
Victoria Bar 121-123 High Street				56°12′11″N 3°25′14″W	Category C(S)	36301	Upload Photo
Old Red Lion Inn (Annexe To Victoria Bar)				56°12′11″N 3°25′14″W	Category C(S)	36302	Upload Photo
11, 13 School Wynd				56°12′13″N 3°25′19″W	Category C(S)	36307	Upload Photo
Lethangie Estate, Stable Block				56°13′11″N 3°24′48″W	Category B	12965	Upload Photo
Kinross Stables				56°12′16″N 3°24′48″W	Category B	11201	Upload Photo
49 Muirs, The Muirs Inn Including Gatepiers And Boundary Walls				56°12′40″N 3°25′30″W	Category C(S)	47316	Upload another image
Turfhills House				56°12′34″N 3°26′35″W	Category B	43207	Upload Photo
Kinross West, Church Of Scotland, (Kinross Parish Kirk) Station Road				56°12′20″N 3°25′25″W	Category B	36283	Upload Photo
'Mossgrove', 18 Muirs				56°12′35″N 3°25′31″W	Category B	36287	Upload Photo
Gates And Lodges At Entrance To Kinross House Policies. Avenue Road				56°12′15″N 3°25′11″W	Category B	36291	Upload Photo
Loch Leven Inn 6 Swan's Acre				56°12′15″N 3°25′17″W	Category C(S)	36294	Upload Photo
Burnbrae Farmhouse, Dairy And Walled Garden				56°12′46″N 3°28′58″W	Category B	13325	Upload Photo
County Buildings 21-25 High Street				56°12′24″N 3°25′18″W	Category B	36288	Upload another image
8 School Wynd And 5 Swan's Acre (Tighnuilt)				56°12′14″N 3°25′19″W	Category C(S)	36293	Upload Photo
98, 100, 102 High Street				56°12′12″N 3°25′16″W	Category B	36295	Upload Photo
7, 9, School Wynd				56°12′13″N 3°25′18″W	Category C(S)	36306	Upload Photo
10 Brewery Lane				56°12′13″N 3°25′20″W	Category C(S)	36308	Upload Photo
Lethangie House With Garden Walls And Gazebo To West, And Summerhouse To East				56°13′10″N 3°24′57″W	Category B	12961	Upload Photo
Watch Tower, East Burial Ground				56°12′03″N 3°24′24″W	Category C(S)	11198	Upload Photo
Municipal Chambers 18 High Street				56°12′22″N 3°25′20″W	Category B	36285	Upload Photo
The Bank House, Former British Linen Bank, 2 High Street				56°12′28″N 3°25′26″W	Category B	36286	Upload Photo
Old Manse, 8 Sandport				56°12′04″N 3°25′15″W	Category B	36304	Upload Photo
Mercat Cross Sandport				56°12′05″N 3°25′17″W	Category B	36305	Upload Photo
Lethangie Estate, South Lodge Including Gatepiers				56°13′07″N 3°24′54″W	Category B	12962	Upload Photo
Annacroich Farm-House				56°10′20″N 3°25′32″W	Category B	11203	Upload Photo
Fountain, High Street				56°12′12″N 3°25′16″W	Category C(S)	36296	Upload another image
The Clock Tower, High Street				56°12′12″N 3°25′16″W	Category B	36297	Upload another image
110 High Street, Former Town Hall				56°12′11″N 3°25′17″W	Category B	36299	Upload another image See more images
Lethangie Estate, Farmbuildings To E Of House				56°13′09″N 3°24′49″W	Category B	12964	Upload Photo
Balado Bridge				56°12′28″N 3°27′29″W	Category B	11202	Upload Photo
The Muirs, St Paul's Episcopal Church Including Boundary Walls And Piers				56°12′41″N 3°25′30″W	Category B	48623	Upload Photo
112 High Street, Carnegie Public Library				56°12′10″N 3°25′17″W	Category C(S)	48649	Upload Photo
Old County Building 109-113 High Street				56°12′12″N 3°25′15″W	Category B	36300	Upload another image
Lethangie Estate, Walled Kitchen Garden, Dovecote And Outbuildings				56°13′09″N 3°24′45″W	Category B	12966	Upload Photo
Lochleven Castle Castle Island Loch Leven				56°12′03″N 3°23′30″W	Category A	11199	Upload another image
Church Hall (Old East U.P. Church)				56°12′12″N 3°25′12″W	Category C(S)	36303	Upload Photo
12 Brewery Lane				56°12′13″N 3°25′20″W	Category C(S)	36309	Upload Photo
Lethangie Estate, West Lodge Including Gatepiers				56°13′12″N 3°25′30″W	Category B	12963	Upload Photo
Bruce Mortuary Chapel, East Burial Ground				56°12′03″N 3°24′23″W	Category C(S)	11197	Upload Photo

== Key ==
The scheme for classifying buildings in Scotland is:

- Category A: "buildings of national or international importance, either architectural or historic; or fine, little-altered examples of some particular period, style or building type."
- Category B: "buildings of regional or more than local importance; or major examples of some particular period, style or building type, which may have been altered."
- Category C: "buildings of local importance; lesser examples of any period, style, or building type, as originally constructed or moderately altered; and simple traditional buildings which group well with other listed buildings."

In March 2016 there were 47,288 listed buildings in Scotland. Of these, 8% were Category A, and 50% were Category B, with the remaining 42% being Category C.
