= Inveralmond Roundabout =

Roundabout in Perth, Scotland

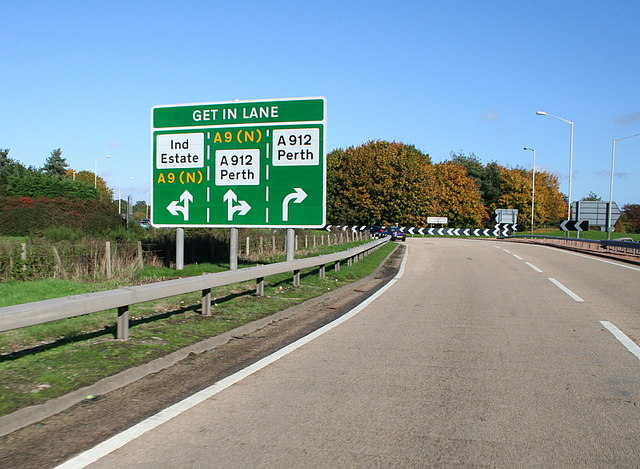
- Approaching the roundabout from the southwest, just beyond St Johnstone's McDiarmid Park stadium (2006)

Location
- Perth, Scotland
- Coordinates: 56°25′09″N 3°27′55″W
- Roads at junction: A9; A912

Construction
- Type: Roundabout
- Maintained by: Transport Scotland

Location in Perth and Kinross

Inveralmond Roundabout is a major traffic roundabout in Perth, Scotland. Located approximately 2 miles (3.2 km) north-northwest of the city centre, it is the meeting point of the A912 Dunkeld Road (at the northern terminus of its route to and from the city centre) and the more prominent A9 road, which changes between being east–west running to north–south, picking up its historic route after skirting the city via a bypass. It is one of Perth's two major roundabouts, the other being at Broxden Junction, where the A9 merges with the M90, 2.3 miles (3.7 km) to the south-southwest.

The roundabout is so named due to its proximity to the River Almond, which flows under the A9 around 1,300 feet (430 yd) to the north, approximately 0.3 miles (0.48 km) west of its confluence with the River Tay.

Inveralmond Industrial Estate is located adjacent to the roundabout to the northwest, accessed by the Ruthvenfield Road exit.

The Cross Tay Link Road is under construction as of July 2022. When completed it will link the section of the A9 immediately north of the roundabout with the A93 and A94 near Scone, to the east.

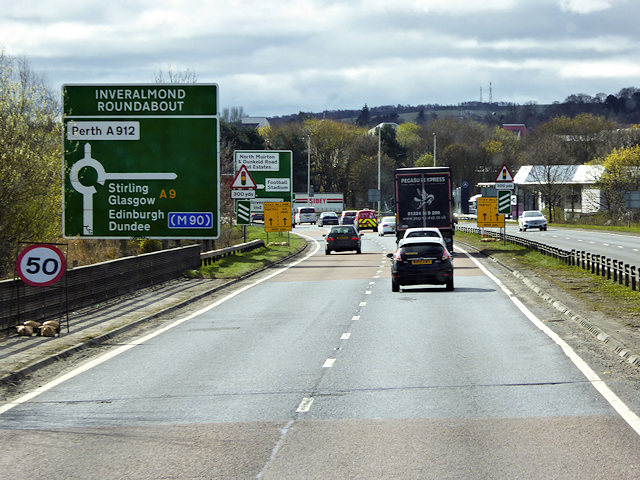
Approaching the roundabout from the north (2017)
