= Strathmiglo =

Coordinates: 56.27684°N 3.27095°W

Strathmiglo: Scottish Gaelic: Srath Mioglach; Scots: Stramiglae; Strath
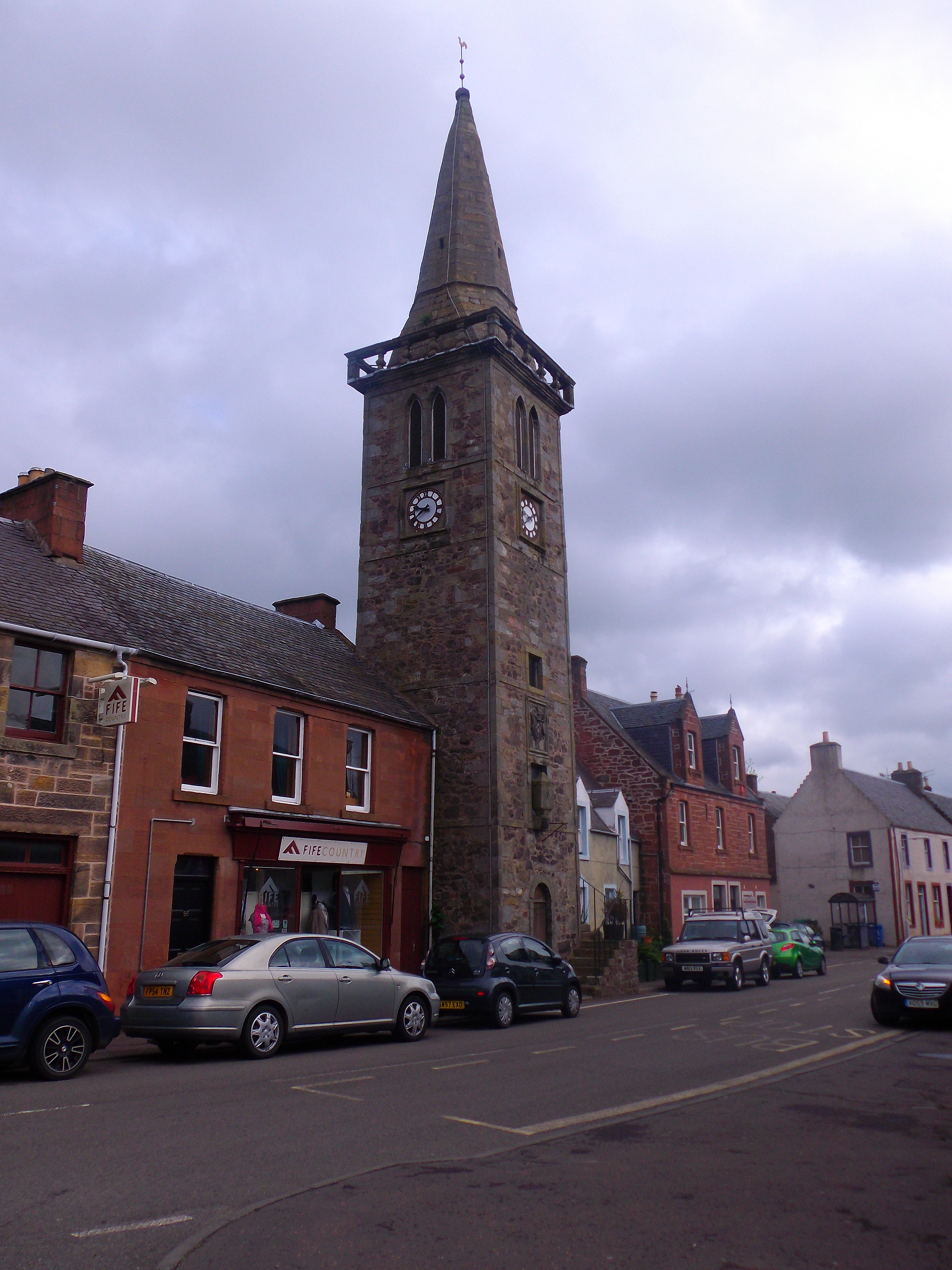
- Strathmiglo High Street with the steeple of Strathmiglo Town House

- Location within Fife
- Population: 870 (2020)
- Council area: Fife
- Country: Scotland
- Sovereign state: United Kingdom
- Police: Scotland
- Fire: Scottish
- Ambulance: Scottish

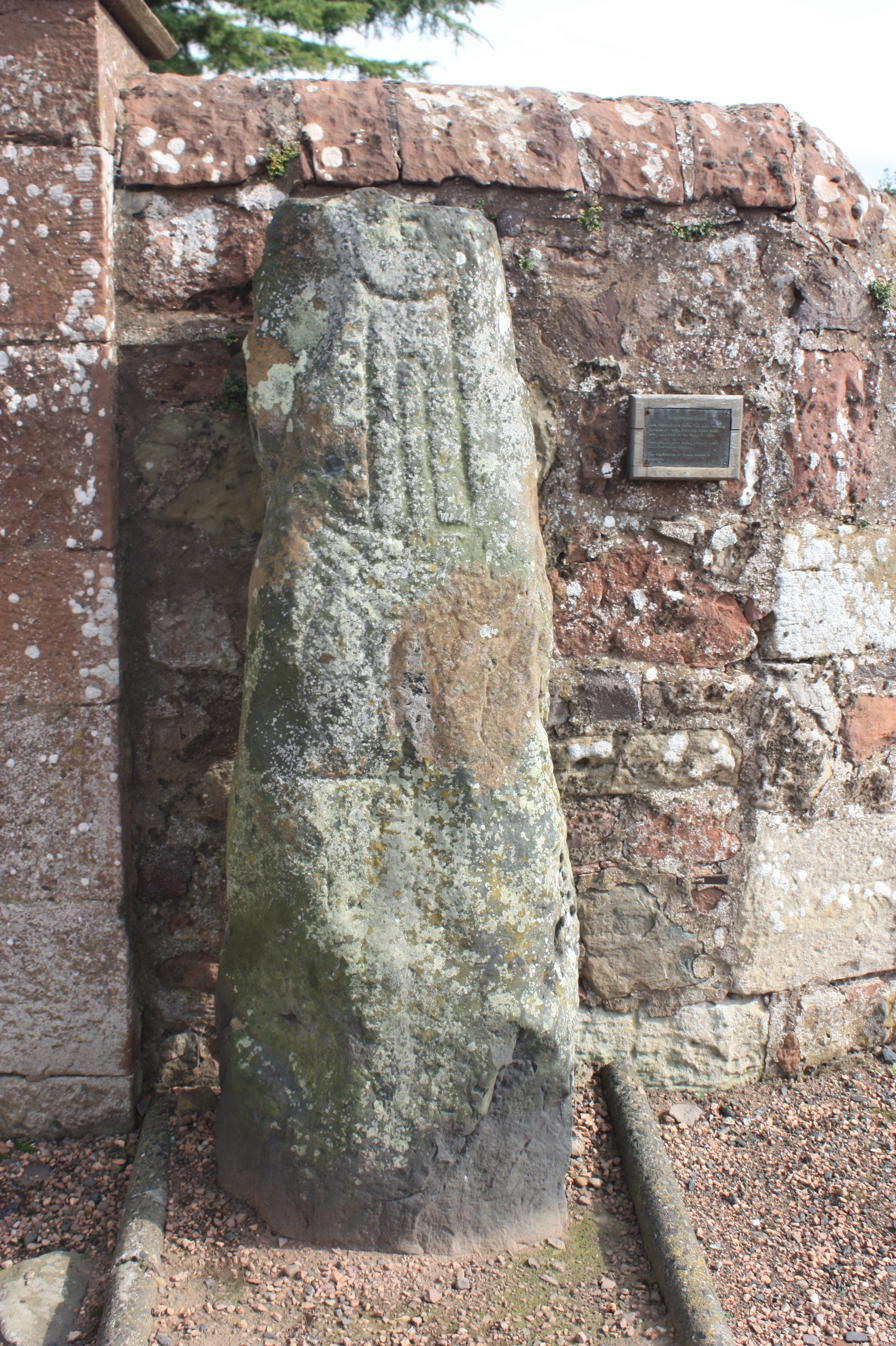
Pictish stone in Strathmiglo

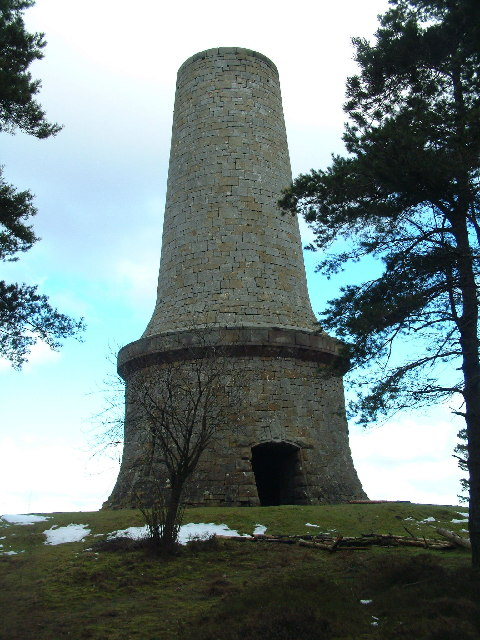
Tyndall Bruce Monument

Strathmiglo (Scottish Gaelic: Srath Mioglach) (Ordnance Survey grid reference NO214101) is a village and parish in the north east of Fife, Scotland on the River Eden. It lies on the old A91 road from Milnathort to Cupar and St. Andrews but was bypassed by a new road to the north in the 1970s. Nearby settlements include Auchtermuchty and Falkland.

== History ==
Strathmiglo is sometimes thought to have belonged to the Mormaers of Fife in early times. Before 1350 it had become the centre of the shire of Strathmigloshire. It became a burgh of barony in the 16th century, by which time it belonged to the Scotts of Balwearie. Prior to the Reformation it was the site of a Collegiate church. Strathmiglo Town House was completed in 1734.

The economic life of the burgh in early times was linked to nearby Falkland Palace. In the 18th and 19th centuries the textile industry was important, as was boot-making in the 20th. There is a Pictish stone by the cemetery. It probably dates from the 9th century and shows a pair of legs (with toes) and stomach above. The upper torso and head are missing as the upper part of the stone is broken and missing. An accompanying plaque describes it as a carving of "a tuning fork".

== Demography ==
The civil parish has a population of 880 (in 2021).

== People from Strathmiglo ==
The Rev. David Williamson, author of "Lectures on Civil and Religious Liberty".

Also, the American country singer-songwriter Johnny Cash and his daughter Rosanne Cash are descended from ancestors originating in Strathmiglo.
