= Scottish Rights of Way and Access Society =

The Scottish Rights of Way and Access Society was formed in 1845 as the 'Association for the Protection of Public Rights of Roadway in and around Edinburgh'. By 1885 it had become the 'Scottish Rights of Way and Recreation Society' and traded as the 'Scottish Rights of Way Society' between 1993 and 1999. The Society which also promotes itself through the shortened title ‘ScotWays’, is a charity and, since 1946, a company limited by guarantee based in Edinburgh. Its aims relate to the preservation and improvement of access to the Scottish countryside.

The Society first published a book Scottish Hill Tracks in 1947. Now in its sixth edition, it details routes for walkers, cyclists and horse-riders.
