= Milnathort =

Coordinates: 56.22766°N 3.41449°W

Milnathort: Scottish Gaelic: Muileann Choirthe
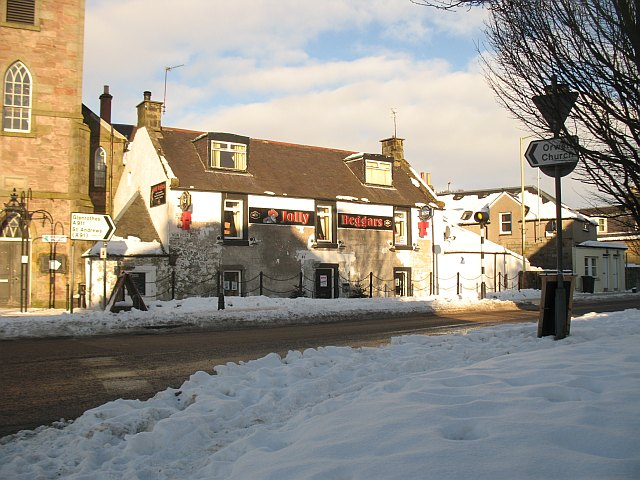
- The centre of Milnathort in winter

- Location within Perth and Kinross
- Population: 1,950 (2020)
- OS grid reference: NO120047
- Council area: Perth and Kinross
- Lieutenancy area: Perth and Kinross
- Country: Scotland
- Sovereign state: United Kingdom
- Post town: KINROSS
- Postcode district: KY13
- Dialling code: 01577
- Police: Scotland
- Fire: Scottish
- Ambulance: Scottish
- UK Parliament: Perth and Kinross-shire
- Scottish Parliament: Perthshire South and Kinross-shire

Milnathort, Scottish Gaelic: Muileann Choirthe, is a small town in the parish of Orwell in the county of Kinross-shire, Scotland and since 1996, the local council area of Perth and Kinross. The smaller neighbour of nearby Kinross, Milnathort has a population of around 2,000 people. It is situated amidst countryside at the foot of the Ochil Hills, and near the north shore of Loch Leven. From 1977 it became more easily accessible due to the development of the M90 motorway. The name was thought to come from the Gaelic maol coirthe meaning "bare hill of the standing stones" but in fact comes originally from Muileann Choirthe - the mill in land of standing stones (probably the Orwell ones) - which got translated into Scots as Miln o' Quhorth and then elided down into the modern Milnathort, though some took Quhorth to be the River Forth and the town is still referred to occasionally as Mills o' Forth

== Amenities ==
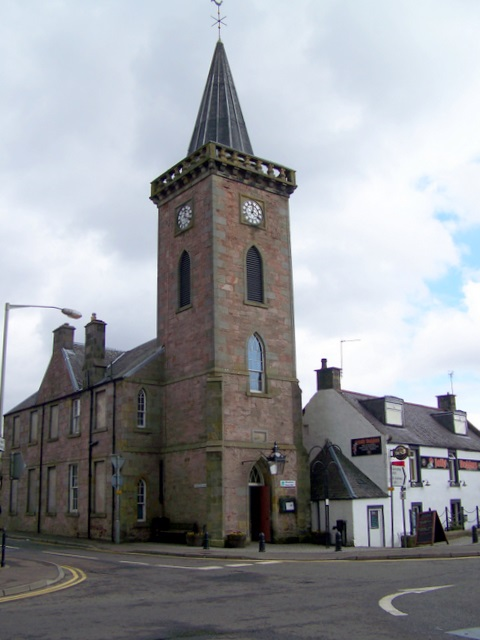
Milnathort Town Hall

Milnathort's amenities are typical of a small Scottish town with a nine-hole golf course, a park, countryside bike path, primary school, a range of pubs, cafés and a shop selling ice cream. Milnathort Town Hall was completed in 1855.

== Church ==
The main church in Milnathort was built as a Secessionist Church in the north of the town and known as the Orwell Church which was built as a chapel in 1741 by the Old Light Burghers and rebuilt in 1821. It amalgamated briefly with the Church of Scotland in 1839 before transferring to the Free Church of Scotland in 1843. The manse was erected by the Free church in 1850 to house Rev James Thornton (1791-1874). The most notable minister was Walter Chalmers Smith.

== Schools ==
The only school is Milnathort Primary School. The high school is Loch Leven Community Campus, just outside the town.

== Notable people ==
- John Calder, publisher
- Prof David Hepburn FRSE, anatomist, President of the Anatomical Society 1916–1918.
- Laura Muir, middle-distance runner
- Lucinda Russell, 2017 and 2023 Grand National-winning horse trainer
- Walter Chalmers Smith, Free Church minister and poet
- Frankie Poullain, bassist for rock band The Darkness (band), was raised in Milnathort.
- William Struth manager of Rangers FC from 1920-1954 was raised in Milnathort
