= River Farg =

Coordinates: 56.34461°N 3.34465°W

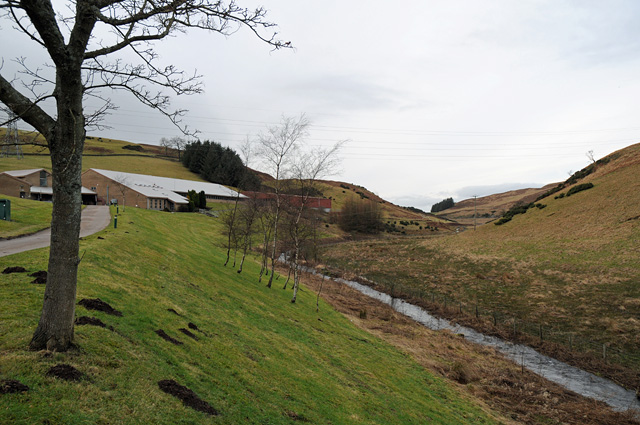
River Farg and the Glenfarg Water Treatment Works

The River Farg (Scottish Gaelic: Fearg, lit. 'wrath') is a small tributary of the River Earn, located in the lieutenancy area of Perth and Kinross, central Scotland.

== Course ==
Its source is located in Glen Farg reservoir; it winds round roads and farms, and has been forced in many places to change course due to human interference. It ends in a confluence where it joins the Earn.

== Etymology ==
The name Farg may represent an Old Gaelic adaptation of Brittonic *wergā, meaning "anger" (cf. Welsh gwery).

== History ==
The river was once a boundary of the Lordship and Barony of Balvaird.

The river was polluted with aluminium sulphate killing nearly all of the fish in May 2014. Scottish Water was fined £8,000 for the incident.
