= Glenfarg =

Coordinates: 56.278589°N 3.401540°W

Glenfarg: Scottish Gaelic: Gleann Fairg
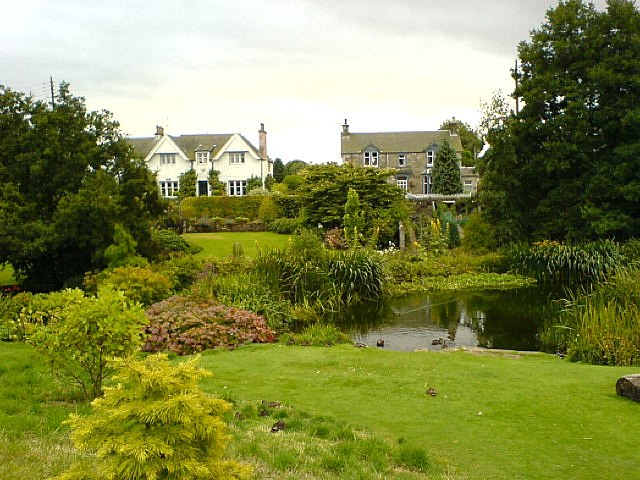
- Glenfarg Green

- Location within Perth and Kinross
- Population: 700 (2020)
- OS grid reference: NO132104
- Civil parish: Arngask
- Council area: Perth and Kinross
- Country: Scotland
- Sovereign state: United Kingdom
- Post town: Perth
- Postcode district: PH2
- Police: Scotland
- Fire: Scottish
- Ambulance: Scottish
- UK Parliament: Perth and Kinross-shire
- Scottish Parliament: Perthshire South and Kinross-shire

Glenfarg (Scottish Gaelic: Gleann Fairg) is a village in the Ochil Hills in Perth and Kinross, Scotland. Until 14 June 1964, the village had a railway station, Glenfarg railway station, on the main line between Perth and Edinburgh via Kinross. Although not recommended for closure under the Beeching Axe, the line nevertheless closed to passengers and freight on 5 January 1970, resulting in slower passenger services to Perth via longer routes. The former railway line is now the route of the M90 motorway, which runs along the eastern periphery of the village. At its peak, the village became a popular holiday destination, boasting four hotels. Services in the village include a church, small shop, tennis courts, riding school and a primary school with nursery.

The 2008 construction work at Glenfarg Water Treatment Works won the accolade of "Most Considerate Site" at the 2009 Considerate Contractors Awards. This project also won two awards at the Scottish Water Awards 2009 "Delivering through Partnership" and "Outperforming the Capital Programme"

It is the source of the River Farg which on one occasion was badly polluted in May 2014, when an employee at the Glenfarg Water Treatment Works at East Blair Farm left a valve open, allowing water to flow into the aluminium sulphate tank. That tank then overflowed, flooding a corridor and draining into the River Farg over a period of several hours.

The village and its surrounding hamlets—including Duncrievie—is governed by Glenfarg Community Council. It lies in the Civil parish of Arngask and the church parish of Abernethy and Dron and Arngask.

== See also ==
- Bein Inn
