= Kinross =

Coordinates: 56.205°N 3.423°W

Kinross: Scottish Gaelic: Ceann Rois
- Town
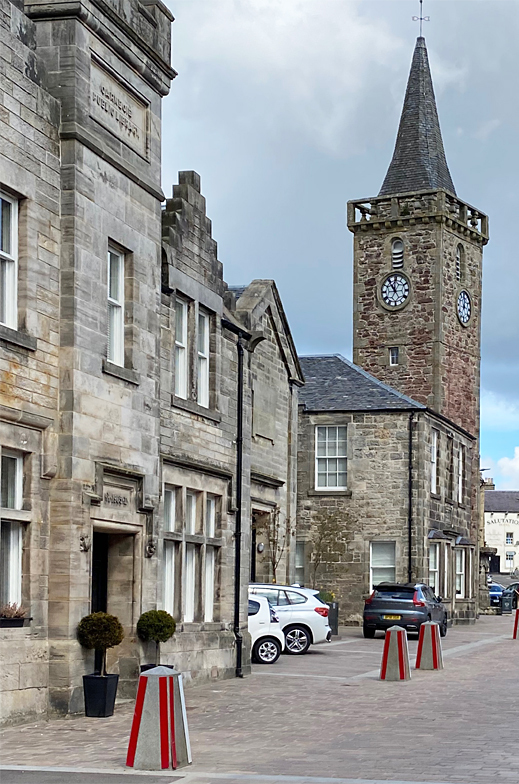
- Kinross Town Hall

- Location within Perth and Kinross
- Area: 2.00 km^{2} (0.77 sq mi)
- Population: 5,609 (2022)
  - Density: 2,805/km^{2} (7,260/sq mi)
- OS grid reference: NO1102
  - Edinburgh: 20 mi (32 km)
  - London: 351 mi (565 km)
- Council area: Perth and Kinross
- Lieutenancy area: Perth and Kinross
- Country: Scotland
- Sovereign state: United Kingdom
- Post town: KINROSS
- Postcode district: KY13
- Dialling code: 01577
- Police: Scotland
- Fire: Scottish
- Ambulance: Scottish
- UK Parliament: Perth and Kinross-shire
- Scottish Parliament: Perthshire South and Kinross-shire

Kinross (/kɪnˈrɒs/, Scottish Gaelic: Ceann Rois) is an historic market town and burgh in Perth and Kinross, Scotland, Historically the traditional county town of the historic county of Kinross-shire, it is approximately 13 miles (21 kilometres) south of Perth and around 20 miles (32 kilometres) northwest of Edinburgh. It had a population of 5,609 in 2022.

== History ==
Kinross's origins are connected with the nearby Loch Leven and its islands whose history goes back to the 5th century AD. Kinross developed as a staging post on the Great North Road from North Queensferry to Perth. In time, local industry developed and by the early 18th century the town had grown to a population of around 600 people. By the mid-19th century, a thriving wool weaving industry had emerged. Kinross Town Hall was completed in 1841.

== Location and transport ==
The site of the original Pre-Reformation parish church and churchyard is down a small wynd overlooking Loch Leven, a little away from the town. The church was dedicated to St. Serf and was under control of Dunfermline Abbey. Noteworthy ministers included John Colden from 1593 to 1640 and his son George Colden who served until 1665. The notorious Henry Christie was minister of Kinross 1679–89.

Rev Robert McGill served from 1698 until 1726, and recorded supernatural events in the manse in 1718. Rev Robert Stark was initially unpopular but served from 1732 to 1783.

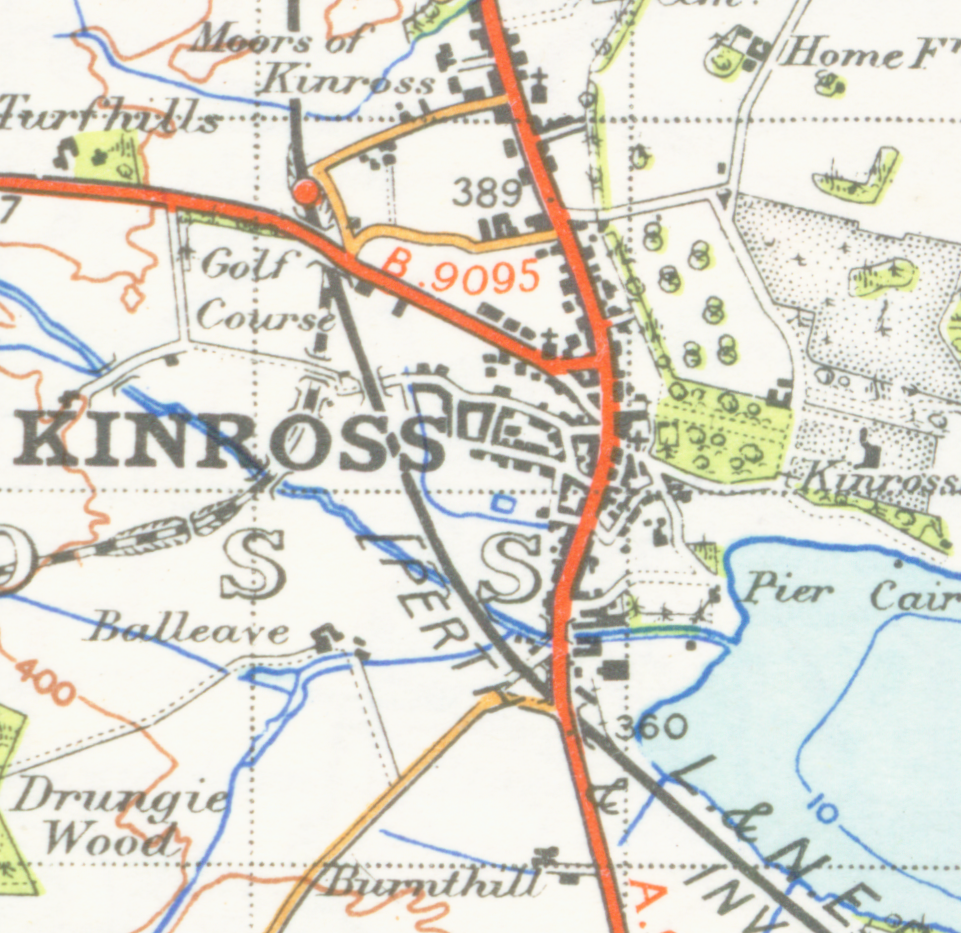
A map of Kinross from 1945

Kinross was once linked by railway to Perthshire, Fife and Clackmannanshire until the rail links gradually disappeared. At one time three independent railway companies had their termini at the town. The Fife and Kinross Railway came from the east, the Kinross-shire Railway came from the south and the Devon Valley Railway came from the west. Kinross Junction railway station stood on the main line between Perth and Edinburgh, but this was closed in 1970 to make way for construction of the M90 motorway. Since then, many people working within a commuting radius of Kinross have settled in the town owing to its central location and local amenities. Locals and Members of the Scottish Parliament (MSPs) have also asked the Scottish Government to publish a Feasibility Study into re-establishing the Perth–Edinburgh Direct Rail Link. As of 2021, no such document has been published.

Kinross is served by local and long-distance bus services including Megabus services M90, M91 and M92 which call at the Sainsbury's Park & Ride site off Junction 6 of the M90 motorway.

== Tourism ==
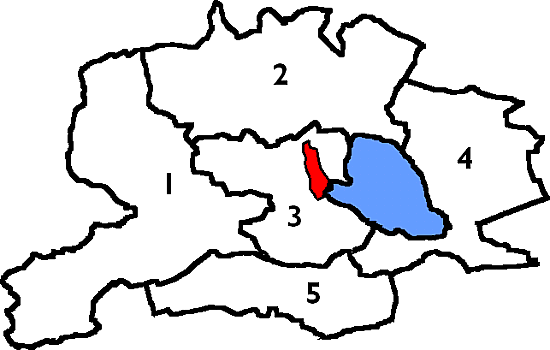
Parishes of Kinross-shire. Kinross is no. 3

The burgh (red on the map) is located on the shores of Loch Leven (blue on the map). There are boat trips around the loch and to Lochleven Castle, where Mary, Queen of Scots was held prisoner in 1567.

Up to 2014 the annual T in the Park music festival, which was officially replaced by TRNSMT festival in Glasgow Green, was held nearby, at the former RAF Balado Bridge airfield. This was also the location of a now decommissioned NATO ICBM early warning radar, and until the late 1950s was a training base for the Royal Air Force.

== Climate ==
Kinross has an oceanic climate (Köppen: Cfb).

Climate data for Kinross (120 m or 394 ft asl, averages 1991–2020, extremes 1967-2023)
Month	Jan	Feb	Mar	Apr	May	Jun	Jul	Aug	Sep	Oct	Nov	Dec	Year
Record high °C (°F)	14.7 (58.5)	15.2 (59.4)	21.3 (70.3)	22.7 (72.9)	26.9 (80.4)	30.1 (86.2)	31.7 (89.1)	29.1 (84.4)	26.7 (80.1)	23.5 (74.3)	17.1 (62.8)	14.9 (58.8)	31.7 (89.1)
Mean daily maximum °C (°F)	6.1 (43.0)	6.9 (44.4)	8.9 (48.0)	11.7 (53.1)	14.9 (58.8)	17.5 (63.5)	19.3 (66.7)	18.9 (66.0)	16.4 (61.5)	12.4 (54.3)	8.7 (47.7)	6.2 (43.2)	12.4 (54.3)
Daily mean °C (°F)	3.1 (37.6)	3.5 (38.3)	5.0 (41.0)	7.2 (45.0)	10.0 (50.0)	12.8 (55.0)	14.6 (58.3)	14.2 (57.6)	11.9 (53.4)	8.5 (47.3)	5.3 (41.5)	3.1 (37.6)	8.3 (46.9)
Mean daily minimum °C (°F)	0.0 (32.0)	0.1 (32.2)	1.1 (34.0)	2.7 (36.9)	5.2 (41.4)	8.2 (46.8)	9.9 (49.8)	9.5 (49.1)	7.4 (45.3)	4.6 (40.3)	1.9 (35.4)	−0.1 (31.8)	4.2 (39.6)
Record low °C (°F)	−18.4 (−1.1)	−19.3 (−2.7)	−14.5 (5.9)	−7.1 (19.2)	−3.2 (26.2)	−0.6 (30.9)	2.5 (36.5)	2.1 (35.8)	−1.4 (29.5)	−5.7 (21.7)	−11.7 (10.9)	−18.0 (−0.4)	−19.3 (−2.7)
Average precipitation mm (inches)	122.9 (4.84)	95.7 (3.77)	81.4 (3.20)	60.7 (2.39)	61.4 (2.42)	73.2 (2.88)	83.1 (3.27)	92.3 (3.63)	80.1 (3.15)	110.4 (4.35)	109.6 (4.31)	111.3 (4.38)	1,082 (42.60)
Average precipitation days (≥ 1.0 mm)	16.8	14.0	13.8	10.9	11.3	12.5	13.0	13.5	12.6	15.8	15.9	15.7	165.7
Mean monthly sunshine hours	31.9	66.9	110.1	156.4	188.9	151.2	161.9	157.8	121.8	80.7	46.0	22.0	1,295.4
Source 1: Met Office
Source 2: Starlings Roost Weather

== Sport and recreation ==
The Loch Leven Trails offer 21 km (13 miles) of walking and cycling heritage trails around the shoreline of Loch Leven. It runs from RSPB Vane Farm Nature Reserve via Findatie to Kinross Pier/Kirkgate Park.

There is a leisure centre located in Kinross, called Loch Leven Leisure.

Kinross Trout Fishery, situated just on the edge of the village, is one of Scotland's premier trout fisheries, giving fly and bait anglers the opportunity to catch some of Scotland's largest trout.

Kinross Colts FC is a community football club and registered charity with over 400 boys, girls, men and women playing in 16 teams within the club. They have two grounds locally, The Myre at Smith Street in Kinross and Donaldson Park in Milnathort.

Kinross is also home to Kinross Rugby Club, who play their games at King George V ground alongside Kinross Hockey Club. Locally the ground is known as KGV.

== Notable people ==
- Andrew Barlass (1822–1895), American politician and farmer, born in Kinross.
- Steven Caulker (born 1991), lived with his aunt and uncle in Kinross when playing for Dundee F.C.
- Rev Henry Christie minister
- Eilidh Doyle Scotland's most decorated track and field athlete
- Adam Kelso Fulton, Scottish rugby union internationalist
- Peter Leitch, recipient of the Victoria Cross
- Andrew Montford writer
- George Thompson (1920–1945), awarded posthumous Victoria Cross in 1945 often cited as the best merited of the entire air war. He was the wireless operator in a Lancaster of No. 9 Squadron on a dawn raid against the Dortmund-Ems Canal when the plane was struck by a salvo of two 88 mm shells.
- William Whyte (banker) (1878–1945)

== Twin towns ==
Kinross is twinned with:

- Gacé, Orne, Normandy, France
- Traunstein, Upper Bavaria, Bavaria, Germany

== Education ==
- Kinross High School (Now located in Loch Leven Community Campus as of 2010)
- Kinross Primary School
