= Will Jordan (author) =

Scottish novelist (born 1983)

- Born: 30 April 1983 (age 43); Fife, Scotland
- Other name: The Critical Drinker
- Occupations: Writer; YouTuber
- Years active: 2012–present
- Children: 2

YouTube information
- Channels: The Critical Drinker; The Critical Gamer; The Critical Drinker After Hours
- Years active: 2018–present
- Genre: Film reviews
- Subscribers: 2.50 million
- Views: 1.06 billion
- Jordan's voice Jordan talking about the 2005 film The Descent; Recorded August 3, 2023
- Last updated: September 10, 2026

Will Jordan (born 30 April 1983) is a Scottish novelist, film critic and YouTuber. He runs the film review YouTube channel named The Critical Drinker, in which he discusses popular media from a right-wing perspective. He has been described as being part of the "anti-woke" movement. (Note: Attributed to multiple sources:) His channel has over 2.5 million subscribers.

Jordan is the author of the Ryan Drake series, and has written a total of eleven novels. His first novel Redemption (2012) was nominated for the McIlvanney Prize. A short film adaptation, Rogue Elements: A Ryan Drake Story was released in 2024.

== Life and career ==
Will Jordan was born on 30 April 1983, and was raised in Fife, Scotland. (Note: See: "Will Jordan: books, biography". Amazon.com. Archived from the original on 21 September 2023. "Will Jordan was born in Fife, Scotland in 1983."; "The Critical Drinker (@TheCriticalDri2) on X". X (formerly Twitter). 30 April 2021. "Its my birthday today! So I'm going out with my friends tonight to get fucked up. But in the meantime, here's a little something extra...") He completed an honours degree in Information Technology before working in web design for Sky Digital. As of 2026, Jordan still lives in Fife, with his wife and two children.

=== 2010–present: YouTube career ===
The Critical Drinker's YouTube profile picture, which is a drawing of his fictionalised persona as an alcoholic, which he uses to review films.

Jordan created his YouTube channel in 2006 under the name "jacktaylor83". Jordan began producing videos for the website in the 2010s, before then publishing film reviews on his channel, which was re-named to "The Critical Drinker". After posting three videos in 2012, the channel went inactive until Jordan started uploading more consistently in 2018.

Many of his critiques are focused on identity politics and plot inconsistencies in modern films. According to him, a number of such films have at times prioritised the promotion of leftist ideologies at the cost of effective storytelling. Jordan occasionally makes videos showing positive examples of Hollywood films. Most of his videos are narrated by his humorous "drinker" persona, which Die Welt described as "an exaggerated version of" Jordan himself.

Jordan has criticised films such as Captain Marvel and the Star Wars Sequels for their feminist messaging and portrayal of men. His review of Captain Marvel, in which he played his persona for the first time, caused his channel to grow substantially. His review of Ghostbusters (2016) also gained popularity on the platform.

According to Matt Dinniman, Jordan collaborated with the third book of the Dungeon Crawler Carl series. Dinniman later wrote in 2025, as an adaptation of the books was being produced, that he regretted Jordan's participation in the project. Jordan responded on social media that he found Dinniman's response "interesting since he was VERY excited to work with me and claimed to be a big fan when it benefited him".

Jordan runs the Critical Drinker podcast on YouTube. During a conversation with Project Hail Mary author Andy Weir, Jordan praised the film adaptation of the book as a quality science fiction film that appeals to a modern audience that grew up with Star Trek. During the conversation, Jordan defended the position that Paramount should remove all modern Star Trek shows, from Enterprise to Starfleet Academy, from the franchise's canon. As of 2026, his channel has over 2.5 million subscribers.

=== 2012–2022: Author ===
Jordan has written and published a total eleven novels. His first novel was Redemption from 2012, and his latest being Dark Harvest from 2022. He's best known for creating the Ryan Drake series which is about a man named Drake who is recruited into the CIA as part of an elite covert team discovers his commanding officer has gone rogue. Jordan would release nine installments in the series. Adrian Magson described Jordan's debut as an action-packed "roller-coaster". Myles McWeeney said on the Irish Independent that the novel was "a thrill-a-minute adventure with likeable and well-drawn central characters". His novel Redemption was nominated for the McIlvanney Prize. Novelist Linda Wilson wrote on Crime Review about Jordan's third novel Betrayal that "If you like your thrillers fast, complex and realistic, you’ll feel at home here." She has compared his writing style to Matt Hilton's and Sean Black's.

==== Film adaptation ====
In 2022, Jordan started a Kickstarter crowdfunded campaign to make Rogue Elements: A Ryan Drake Story, a short action thriller film based on the Ryan Drake series. The campaign was funded by 5,212 backers who pledge a total of £303,339 for the production. Filming began in 2023, in Peterborough. It was directed by Travis Grant and was co-written by Grant and Jordan. The film was released in 2024. Rogue Elements received a negative review from Kieran Freemantle of Pop Culture Maniacs, saying while it was good for a low-budget action film, It was "no better than a Steven Seagal straight-to-DVD film." Freemantle also points out the irony that while Jordan criticises the "girl boss" and feminist messages in Hollywood films, he is shot in the head by a woman during his own cameo appearance. After the films release, Jordan made a video about the production of Rogue Elements and defended criticisms levelled against the film.

== Views ==
Politically, Jordan has been described in many sources as being on the right. On his YouTube channel, he discusses media from a reactionary perspective, critiquing what he describes as woke elements in films.

Sandy Schaefer of /Film has described Jordan's YouTube channel as being a right-wing, conservative platform that regularly rallies against progressive media. According to Schaefer, Jordan opposes media that includes women, people of colour, and "essentially anyone who's not white, straight, cisgender, and male." A 2022 research study described six YouTube channels, including The Critical Drinker, as having a reactionary viewpoint, stating that the videos of those channels "express a desire to return to an earlier status quo, are critical of increased diversity in casting choices and storylines in popular films and consider media as it used to be of higher quality", quoting Jordan as describing recent Marvel films as having “leaned far too heavily on identity politics, aggressively trying to lecture their audience about the evils of modern culture rather than presenting a fun story”.

His criticisms towards the "current trend towards diversity," have been met with pushback by many. He has been described in his comment section as "intolerant or misogynistic," which Jordan denies saying "I have nothing against the representation of minorities or strong women's roles! It's just the clumsy way they're built up into heroines by portraying them as flawless." Die Welt described him as an opponent of "woke ideology", and of what Jordan sees as "simplistic, left-leaning messages" such as toxic masculinity, or inclusion of powerful female characters that in Jordan's opinion do not experience sufficient adversity for character growth. Jordan positively reviewed Sound of Freedom, stating "I mean, you’d think a movie that sheds light on the hidden nightmare of child trafficking would be a pretty admirable cause worthy of support."

== Bibliography ==
- Redemption. Cornerstone. 2012. ISBN 9780099574460.
- Sacrifice. Cornerstone. 2013. ISBN 9780099574477.
- Betrayal. Cornerstone. 2014. ISBN 9780099574484.
- Black List. Canelo. 2015. ISBN 9781788634601.
- Deception Game. Canelo. 2015. ISBN 9781788634595.
- Ghost Target. Canelo. 2016. ISBN 9781788634618.
- Patterson, James (2017). Deadly Cargo. BookShots. ISBN 978-1786531766.
- Shadow Conflict. Canelo. 2017. ISBN 9781788634625.
- Downfall. Canelo. 2019. ISBN 9781788634632.
- Something to Die For. Canelo. 2020. ISBN 9781800322011.
- Dark Harvest. Blackstone Publishing. 2022. ISBN 979-8200698585.

== Filmography ==
| Year | Title | Role | Notes | Ref. |
|---|---|---|---|---|
| 2011 | Limmy's Show! | Jogger | Series 2, Episode 4 | |
| 2023 | Dick Dynamite 1944 | Casualty | | |
| 2024 | Rogue Elements: A Ryan Drake Story | Cameo | Writer and producer | |

== Awards ==
| Year | Category | Institution or publication | Result | Notes | Ref. |
|---|---|---|---|---|---|
| 2012 | McIlvanney Prize | Redemption | Nominated | | |
