= Black Dog Books (American publisher) =

American publisher

- Founded: 1997
- Founder: Tom Roberts
- Country of origin: United States
- Headquarters location: Normal, Illinois
- Publication types: Books
- Fiction genres: Adventure fiction
- Official website: blackdogbooks.net

Black Dog Books (BDB) is an independent press operation in Normal, Illinois, founded in 1997 by publisher Tom Roberts to keep an outlet for adventure fiction alive. It has expanded to publish fiction in the adventure, mystery, science fiction, and horror genres.

== History ==
Black Dog Books began operations in 1997. The first 40 titles in the BDB line appeared in a chapbook format, with some giveaway titles and memorial books added to that figure. In 2006, a trade paperback line was launched.

Since the first title, BDB has gone out of its way to produce collections of material that is difficult to come by from rare magazines, and overlooked character collections. This extra effort to rescue works from obscurity has brought praise from readers and reviewers alike: "Publisher Tom Roberts is but one of an ever-growing number of those doing a great service, not only for the science fiction and fantasy reader, but for all those who love reading exciting tales of yesteryear from any genre", says Dave Truesdale, publisher of Tangent Online, "by digging into archives and researching and bringing to light once again forgotten, overlooked, or early work by many a classic pulp magazine author. They are to be commended and enthusiastically supported."

Many titles from Black Dog Books include informative introductions by well-known writers or genre-authorities such as Bill Pronzini, F. Paul Wilson, Matt Hilton, Bill Crider, Robert J. Randisi, Peter Berresford Ellis, Robert Weinberg, Will Murray, and James Reasoner, or additional material such as author bibliographies.

As of 2012 Black Dog Books began releasing its backlist as ebooks.
