= Jock Davidson =

Jock Davidson may refer to:

- Andy Davidson (footballer), also known as Jock Davidson, Scottish footballer
- Jock Davidson (rugby union), Scottish international rugby union player
