= Andrew Whitelaw =

Andrew Whitelaw may refer to:

- Andrew Whitelaw (footballer) (1865–1938), Scottish footballer
- Andrew G. L. Whitelaw (born 1946), British neonatologist and academic
