= Andrew G. L. Whitelaw =

British neonatologist

Andrew G. L. Whitelaw (born 31 August 1946) was a British neonatologist and academic, recognized for his contributions to treating conditions affecting newborn babies. He helds the position of Emeritus Professor at Bristol Medical School, where he was associated with Bristol Neuroscience. He died on 9 November 2025.

Whitelaw was a member of the Royal College of Physicians and a Fellow of the Royal College of Paediatrics and Child Health. He also served as the president of the Neonatal Society.

Whitelaw's research has garnered over 15,553 citations across 9,919 publications. Additionally, his h-index is 61.

== Early life ==
Whitelaw was born in West Fife, Scotland to Robert and Cicely Whitelaw.

He received his early education at Commercial Primary School.

== Research ==
=== Intraventricular Haemorrhage (IVH) and Hydrocephalus in Premature Babies ===
One of Whitelaw's notable findings is the efficacy of ventricular lavage in reducing brain injury and disability in post-haemorrhagic hydrocephalus. Ventricular lavage removes toxic substances, such as free iron and pro-inflammatory cytokines, released by old blood.

=== Hypoxic-Ischaemic Injury in Full-Term Babies ===
Whitelaw's research has focused on the prevention and treatment of hypoxic-ischaemic injury in full-term newborns. He has been a pioneer in developing and testing mild cooling as a therapeutic approach for neonatal hypoxic-ischaemic encephalopathy. This intervention, known as therapeutic hypothermia, has been shown to improve the chances of survival without neurological impairment at 18 months of age.

== Awards ==
- Awarded the Raymond Horton-Smith Prize for the best medical thesis of the year (1978).
- Served as President of the Neonatal Society (2006).
- Elected as a member of the Norwegian Academy of Science and Letters (2016).

== Selected publications ==
- Whitelaw, Andrew; Jary, Sally; Kmita, Grazyna; Wroblewska, Jolanta; Musialik-Swietlinska, Ewa; Mandera, Marek; Hunt, Linda; Carter, Michael; Pople, Ian (1 April 2010). "Randomized Trial of Drainage, Irrigation, and Fibrinolytic Therapy for Premature Infants with Posthemorrhagic Ventricular Dilatation: Developmental Outcome at 2 years". Pediatrics. 125 (4): e852–e858. doi:10.1542/peds.2009-1960. PMID 20211949.
- Gluckman, Peter D; Wyatt, John S; Azzopardi, Denis; Ballard, Roberta; Edwards, A. David; Ferriero, Donna M; Polin, Richard A; Robertson, Charlene M; Thoresen, Marianne; Whitelaw, Andrew; Gunn, Alistair J (February 2005). "Selective Head Cooling with Mild Systemic Hypothermia after Neonatal Encephalopathy: Multicentre Randomized Trial". The Lancet. 365 (9460): 663–670. doi:10.1016/S0140-6736(05)17946-X. PMID 15721471.
- Azzopardi, Denis V.; Strohm, Brenda; Edwards, A. David; Dyet, Leigh; Halliday, Henry L.; Juszczak, Edmund; Kapellou, Olga; Levene, Malcolm; Marlow, Neil; Porter, Emma; Thoresen, Marianne; Whitelaw, Andrew; Brocklehurst, Peter (October 2009). "Moderate Hypothermia to Treat Perinatal Asphyxial Encephalopathy". New England Journal of Medicine. 361 (14): 1349–1358. doi:10.1056/NEJMoa0900854.
- Azzopardi, Denis; Strohm, Brenda; Marlow, Neil; Brocklehurst, Peter; Deierl, Aniko; Eddama, Oya; Goodwin, Julia; Halliday, Henry L.; Juszczak, Edmund; Kapellou, Olga; Levene, Malcolm; Linsell, Louise; Omar, Omar; Thoresen, Marianne; Tusor, Nora; Whitelaw, Andrew; Edwards, A. David (10 July 2014). "Effects of Hypothermia for Perinatal Asphyxia on Childhood Outcomes". New England Journal of Medicine. 371 (2): 140–149. doi:10.1056/NEJMoa1315788.
- Edwards, A. D.; Brocklehurst, P.; Gunn, A. J.; Halliday, H.; Juszczak, E.; Levene, M.; Strohm, B.; Thoresen, M.; Whitelaw, A.; Azzopardi, D. (9 February 2010). "Neurological Outcomes at 18 Months of Age after Moderate Hypothermia for Perinatal Hypoxic-Ischaemic Encephalopathy: Synthesis and Meta-Analysis of Trial Data". BMJ. 340 (feb09 3): c363. doi:10.1136/bmj.c363. PMC 2819259. PMID 20144981.
- Draycott, Timothy J.; Crofts, Joanna F.; Ash, Jonathan P.; Wilson, Louise V.; Yard, Elaine; Sibanda, Thabani; Whitelaw, Andrew (July 2008). "Improving Neonatal Outcome Through Practical Shoulder Dystocia Training". Obstetrics & Gynecology. 112 (1): 14–20. doi:10.1097/AOG.0b013e31817bbc61.
- Draycott, Tim; Sibanda, Thabani; Owen, Louise; Akande, Valentine; Winter, Cathy; Reading, Sandra; Whitelaw, Andrew (February 2006). "Does Training in Obstetric Emergencies Improve Neonatal Outcomes?". BJOG: An International Journal of Obstetrics & Gynaecology. 113 (2): 177–182. doi:10.1111/j.1471-0528.2006.00800.x. PMID 16411995.
- Miall-Allen, V. M.; de Vries, L. S.; Whitelaw, A. G. (1 October 1987). "Mean Arterial Blood Pressure and Neonatal Cerebral Lesions". Archives of Disease in Childhood. 62 (10): 1068–1069. doi:10.1136/adc.62.10.1068. PMC 1778679. PMID 3314723.
