= Links Market =

Street fair in Kirkcaldy, Scotland

Coordinates: 56.10469°N 3.15814°W

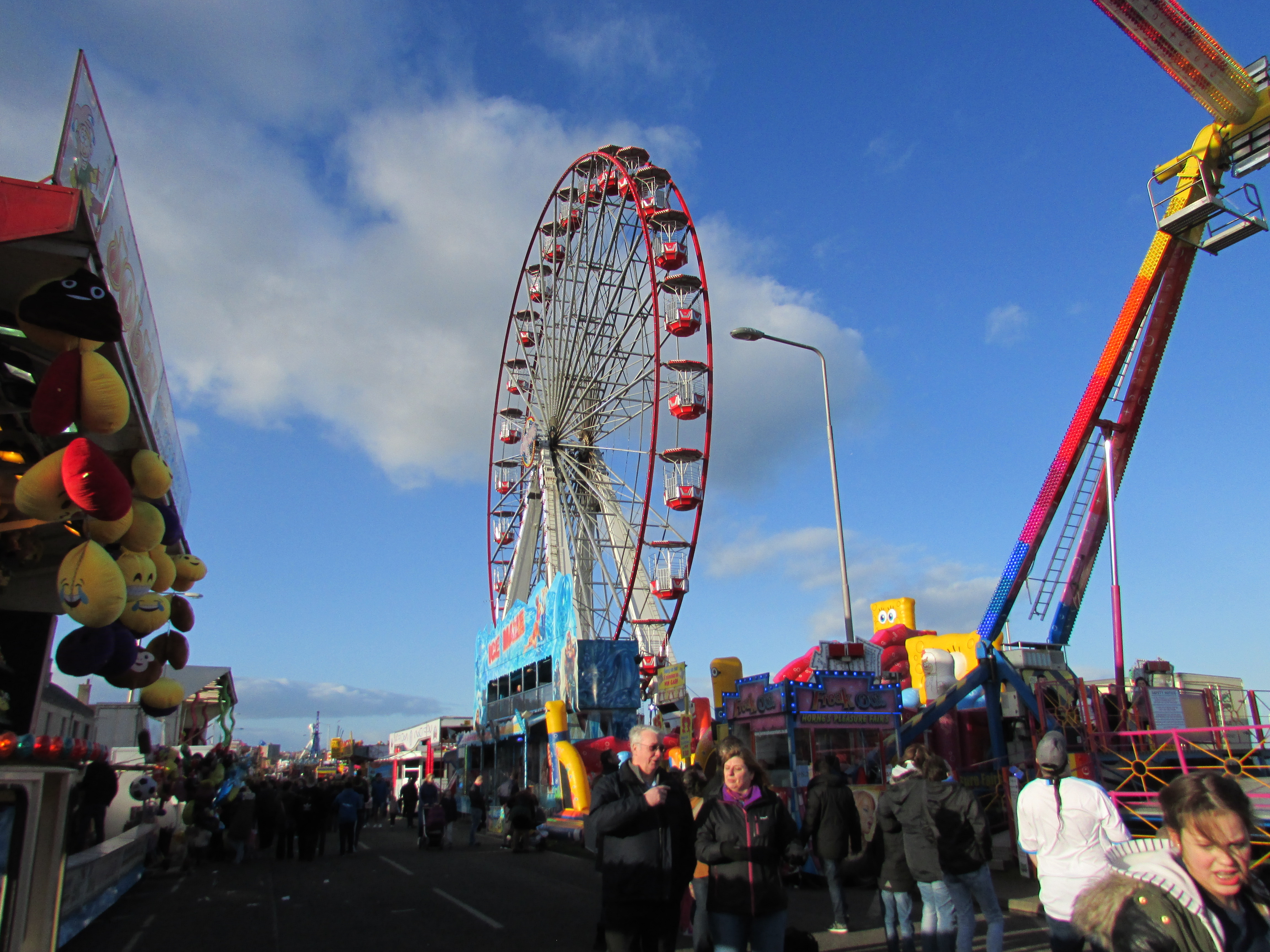
Links Market

The Links Market in Kirkcaldy, Fife is Europe's longest street fair and the oldest in Scotland. Established in 1304, the annual six-day event attracts between 200,000 and 300,000 visitors to the town. 2004 was the 700th anniversary of the event, with 225 attractions and an estimated attendance of more than half a million visitors. The Links Market is held along the town's seafront.

A regular market on the site is recorded from 1304.
