= Fothriff =

Province of Scotland in the Middle Ages

Coordinates: 56.250°N 3.417°W

Fothriff or Fothrif was a province of Scotland in the Middle Ages. It is often paired with Fife, not only in De Situ Albanie, but also in early charters.

The exact extent of early Fothriff is unclear, but in around 1300 the Deanery of Fothriff in the Bishopric of St Andrews included both Clackmannan and Kinross, as well as Fife from the parishes of Auchtermuchty, Lathrisk, Cults, Kirkforthar Markinch and Methil westwards.

== Etymology ==
The name Fothriff was recorded in the 11th century as Fotriffe and may ultimately be of Brittonic origin. The name is derived from *vo-treb, meaning "sub-settlement" (> Welsh godref).

== See also ==
- Mormaerdom of Fife
