= Driftland =

Coordinates: 56°07′40″N 3°16′44″W

Driftland is a purpose-built race track for drifting at the Lochgelly Motorsport Complex, Fife, Scotland, inspired by the drift tracks of Japan.

The facility is the only race track in the UK that is dedicated to drifting. Onsite storage is also available.

Events held at Driftland include the British Drift Championship, the Ultimate Scottish Ford Show, Retro Drift Challenge, and the Scottish Drift Championships.
