= Jock Davidson (rugby union) =

Scotland international rugby union player

- Full name: John Alexander Davidson
- Born: 6 August 1932 Avoch, Ross, Scotland
- Died: 22 January 2016 (aged 83) St Monans, Fife, Scotland
- School: Waid Academy
- Occupation: Engineer

Rugby union career
- Position: No. 8
International career
Years	Team	Apps	(Points)
1959–60	Scotland	3	(0)

John Alexander Davidson (6 August 1932 — 22 January 2016) was a Scottish international rugby union player.

== Biography ==
Davidson was born in the harbourside village of Avoch on the Black Isle and after moving to St Monans, Fife, attended Waid Academy. He played his early rugby in England and was with London Scottish when he was first capped.

After representing North of Scotland against the 1957-58 Wallabies, Davidson made his Scotland debut as a number eight in their final 1959 Five Nations fixture, a Calcutta Cup match against England at Twickenham. He gained a further two caps in the 1960 Five Nations, returning for a rare win at Lansdowne Road, Scotland's first for 27 years, before making another Calcutta Cup appearance. His lack of further caps may have come down to being made a scapegoat for the loss to England, having fumbled a certain try at a crucial time. Through his work as an engineer, Davidson spent some time working in France, where he played rugby for several clubs including Racing Club de France.

== See also ==
- List of Scotland national rugby union players
