= Freuchie =

Coordinates: 56.247778°N 03.156111°W

Freuchie: Scottish Gaelic: Fraochaidh
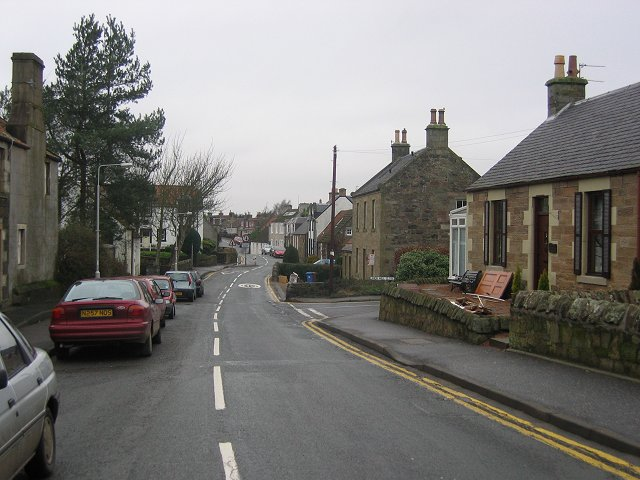
- Freuchie

- Location within Fife
- Population: 1,250 (2020)
- OS grid reference: NO2806
  - London: 500 mi (800 km)
- Council area: Fife
- Lieutenancy area: Fife
- Country: Scotland
- Sovereign state: United Kingdom
- Post town: CUPAR
- Postcode district: KY15
- Dialling code: 01337
- Police: Scotland
- Fire: Scottish
- Ambulance: Scottish
- UK Parliament: North East Fife
- Scottish Parliament: North East Fife

Freuchie (Scots pronunciation: [ˈfruxɪ], locally [ˈfrʌxɪ]) is a village in Fife, Scotland, at the foot of the Lomond Hills, and near Falkland. The nearest major town is Glenrothes located 4 miles to the south.

The name derives from the Scottish Gaelic, fraoch, meaning heather.

This Fife village is not to be confused with the old location of the same name in Morayshire (now in the Highland Council Area) upon which the new town of Grantown was built in the 18th century.

Freuchie was once used by the Royal family as a place of banishment from the Court when it was in nearby Falkland Palace.

The Scots sayings "Awa tae Freuchie where the froggies bide" and "awa tae Freuchie an eat mice" both make reference to the village, these insults would be directed at prisoners of the Stuart kings residing in Falkland Palace, 2 miles to the west, prisoners would be held in the village awaiting execution. Another aphoristic usage occurs in the phrase "as Scots as Freuchie", although whether this might ultimately stem from the Morayshire location is not certain.

Freuchie Cricket Club is best known for having won the village cricket championships at Lord's in 1985. This is considered particularly unusual as Scottish teams are not generally prominent in the game.

On 13 August 2008, a number of locations throughout the village were affected by flooding, resulting in damage to homes and cars being written off by insurance companies. Many of the affected residents came together to form Freuchie Flood Action Group, a single action group dedicated to improving flood protection and prevention in Freuchie.
