= St Andrews Museum =

Museum in St Andrews, Scotland

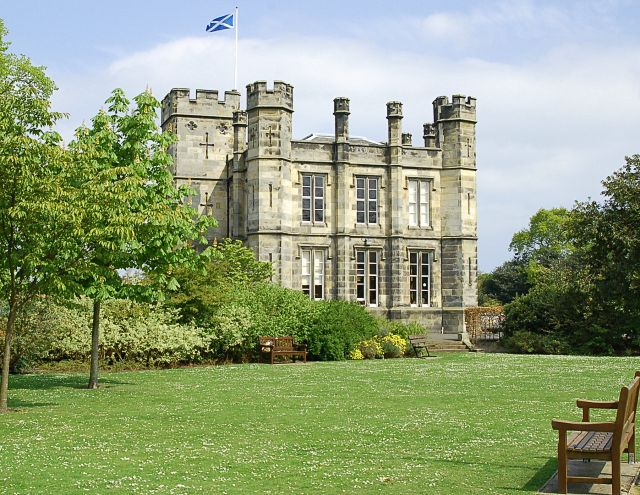
- St Andrews Museum seen from Kinburn Park
- Established: 1991
- Location: St Andrews; Fife; Scotland
- Coordinates: 56.339651°N 2.805339°W
- Type: Local History
- Website: St Andrews Museum

The St Andrews Museum is a museum focusing on the history of the town of St Andrews in St Andrews, Fife, Scotland.

== The Collection ==
The Museum holds a permanent collection of objects of historical value that are related to the town of St Andrews. It explores the history of the town from its beginnings to the present day; as well as also hosting temporary exhibitions.
