= Kenn Burke =

Scottish ballet dancer

- Born: Fife, Scotland
- Occupation: Dancer

Kenn Burke is a Scottish ballet dancer from Fife. He completed his training at the Royal Ballet School in England in 1975. He subsequently returned to Scotland where he performed for the Scottish Ballet in leading roles in Elliot Goldenthal's Othello, Prokofiev's Romeo and Juliet, and Carl Maria von Weber's Le Spectre de la Rose. In 1988, he joined the Hong Kong Ballet as principal dancer.

In 1990, Burke was appointed artistic director of the Scottish Ballet 2. In 1996, he was appointed dance director of the Aberdeen International Youth Festival.

Kenn is artistic director at The Dance School of Scotland.
