= Catherine Steele =

Scottish biochemist

Catherine Cassels Steele
- Born: 17 September 1903; West Calder, West Lothian, Scotland
- Died: 3 December 1995 (aged 92); Lacey, Washington
- Education: University of St Andrews; University of Illinois; Harvard University
- Known for: Expertise in plant biochemistry
- Spouse: Louis Hamilton Bock

Catherine Cassels Steele (17 September 1903 – 3 December 1995) was a Scottish scientist who is best known for her expertise in plant biochemistry. She wrote An Introduction to Plant Biochemistry.

== Early life and education ==
Steele was the daughter of James Steele, the former headmaster of St Monance school in Fife. Steele's early education began at West Calder at the age of five. After moving to St Monans and by age 12, her secondary educational experience occurred at Waid Academy in Anstruther, Fife.

In 1920, Steele entered the University of St Andrews graduating in 1924 with a First Class Honours in mathematics and natural philosophy. She continued to study at the University, and in 1925 received a BSc with Special Distinction in chemistry, physics and mathematics. She joined the Edinburgh Mathematical Society soon after. She changed fields to study chemistry and earned her PhD in 1928. Steele was a Commonwealth Fellow, where she travelled to the United States to continue her research at University of Illinois for two years and then at Harvard University.

== Professional life ==
Steele taught at the Ladies' Branch of the Horticultural College, Swanley, Kent (later the Swanley Horticultural College) in the 1930s where many middle-class women learned horticulture. She later returned to the USA.

Her book An Introduction to Plant Biochemistry was first published in 1934, with a second edition released in 1949. The book aims to assist botany students with no training in organic chemistry for studies of plant biochemistry. Steele wrote the book following support from Professor John Read with whom she collaborated on books such as Researches in the Methane Series Part VI and Part VII and The Optically Active Diphenylhydroxyethylamines and isoHydrobenzoins.

== Personal life ==
Steele married Louis Hamilton Bock in 1934. Together they had two sons. Steele died on 3 December 3, 1995 in Lacey, Washington.

== See also ==
- Women in science
- Plant physiology
- Women in STEM fields
