= De Situ Albanie =

De Situ Albanie (or dSA for short) is the name given to the first of seven Scottish documents found in the so-called Poppleton Manuscript, now in the Bibliothèque nationale de France, Paris. It was probably written sometime between 1202 and 1214, in the reign of the William the Lion, by a French-speaking resident of Scotland (north of the Forth), as an introduction to the compilation.

The title is taken from the opening words of the piece, which reads:

"De Situ Albanie que in se figuram hominis habet quomodo fuit primitus is septem regionibus diuisa quibusque nominibus antiquitus sit uocata et a quibus inhabitata"

== De Situ Albanie and the Seven Kingdoms ==
The piece proceeds to carry out the purpose highlighted in the introduction. It recounts that Albanectus, son of Brutus, had seven sons; and that, on his death, the kingdom was split into 7 parts, each one corresponding to a son. The writer lists the seven ancient kingdoms/sons of Albania/Albanectus.

LIST ONE (or DSa)

- Angus with the Mearns (Enegus cum Moerne)
- Atholl and Gowrie (Adtheodle et Gouerin)
- Strathearn with Menteith (Sradeern cum Meneted)
- Fife with Fothriff (Fif cum Fothreue)
- Mar with Buchan (Marr cum Buchen)
- Moray and Ross (Muref et Ross)
- Caithness this side of the mountains and over the mountains (Cathanesia citra montem et ultra montem)

The author then tells us that Andrew, Bishop of Caithness, related another list. This list contradicts the first, as when, for instance, the seventh kingdom in Andrew's list is Argyll rather than Caithness.

LIST TWO (or DSb)

- Forth to Tay
- Forth to Hilef
- Hilef to Dee
- Dee to Spey
- Spey to Druimm nAlban (Ridge of Scotland)
- Moray and Ross
- Argyll (Arregaithel)

The author shows no awareness that the two lists contradict each other. Since the author was probably a Scotto-Norman, this should not surprise us. There have been suggestions that the first list corresponds to a list of Bishoprics, leaving the second as more authentic. What is certain is that the mediaeval Scots did have legends of seven ancient kingdoms.

== Reputation and status ==
The author's motive for writing the dSA and compiling the Scottish Poppleton remains unknown, although he probably can be seen in the tradition of Geoffrey of Monmouth. In the past, the dSA was regarded as an anachronism, and hence as a window on the Gaelic or Pictish past. It has frequently been used as a source for the so-called "seven ancient Kingdoms of Pictland". It was thought that, for instance, the first list represented the ninth century when Argyll was in Pictland, while the second list represented the period before that, before Argyll was taken, and before Caithness was lost.

However, this conception of the document has been discredited in recent years, firstly by Isabel Henderson, and more recently by the Glasgow University-based mediaevalist Professor Dauvit Broun. Most likely, the document has little if anything to do with the Picts.

The document in fact makes perfect sense in the early thirteenth century, and much of his information can actually be traced to the other Scottish documents in the Poppleton MS. For instance, the names of seven sons of Cruithne (=Albanactus?) are given in the Pictish king-list that follows one document after the dSA. (There is another source for the seven kingdoms myth, in a Gaelic quatrain contained in versions of the Lebor Bretnach). Pictland probably had no such structure, and if it did, it was unknown to the author of dSA, except perhaps through Bishop Andreas.

Other matters of interest are the man-simile, the linguistic discussions, and the light the document sheds on the relationship between the Gaelic language (Scottica) and Scottish national identity. On matters such as these, the dSA is in fact a wonderfully useful historical document. David Howlett has recently put a case forward that the structure of the text is based on a biblical paradigm.

== Bibliography ==
- Anderson, Alan Orr, Early Sources of Scottish History: AD 500-1286, Vol. 1, (Edinburgh, 1923), pp. cxv-cxix
- Anderson, Marjorie O., Kings and Kingship in Early Scotland, (Edinburgh, 1973), pp. 240–243
- Broun, Dauvit, "The Seven Kingdoms in De Situ Albanie: A Record of Pictish political geography or imaginary Map of ancient Alba?" in E.J. Cowan & R. Andrew McDonald (eds.), Alba: Celtic Scotland in the Medieval Era, (Edinburgh, 2000, rev. 2005)
- Chadwick, H.M., Early Scotland: The Picts, The Scots & The Welsh of Southern Scotland, (Cambridge, 1949)
- Henderson, Isabel, The Picts, (London, 1967)
- Howlett, David, "The Structure of 'De Situ Albaie", in Simon Taylor (ed.) Kings, Clerics and Chronicles in Scotland, 500-1297, (Dublin/Portland, 2000), pp. 124–45* Skene, William F., Chronicles of the Picts and Scots: And Other Memorials of Scottish History, (Edinburgh, 1867), pp. 135–137
- Watson, W.J., The Celtic Place-Names of Scotland, (Edinburgh, 1926)
