= Waid Academy =

- 'The Waid' or 'Waid'

Location
- St. Andrews Road; Anstruther, Scotland; United Kingdom; 56.2249°N 2.7039°W

Information
- Type: Secondary School
- Motto: “Multi Pertransibunt Et Augebitur Scientia” "Many will pass through and knowledge will be increased"
- Established: September 1886
- Founder: Andrew Waid
- School district: Fife
- Age: 11 to 18
- School Years: S1 - S6
- Gender: Co-Educational
- Enrollment: 670 (June 2020)
- Colours: Red and Black

The Waid Academy is a state secondary school in Anstruther, Fife. The school's catchment area extends to as far as Elie and Colinsburgh to the west and Crail to the east (the East Neuk boundaries) but accepts pupils from towns such as Leven, Upper Largo, Lundin Links, Kennoway and Markinch.

== History ==
Lieutenant Andrew Waid (1736–1804), an Anstruther man, left his money for the founding of Waid's Orphan Naval Academy for the sons of poor mariners and fishermen. For a variety of reasons it was not possible for his wishes to be carried out in the years following his death, and for much of the 19th century his will was ignored and the value of his estate accumulated. At last in 1884, commissioners appointed under the Educational Endowments (Scotland) Act 1882 proposed a scheme for his money to be used for the creation of a secondary school to serve the East Neuk of Fife. On 6 September 1886, The Waid Academy opened for the first time. It was the first school in Scotland to be created under the 1882 act and its constitution became a model for other schools which were created or changed as a result of the act.

The old school campus was split between two buildings. The principal school building was previously the Head Master's house but latterly used for additional teaching rooms. South Waid was erected in 1901, this building sits to the north of Crail road and extended the number of classrooms, although it did result in students having to cross a small road in order to access them. The principal school building was extended in 1955 due to a rising influx of students. This extension consisted of a large two storey building which encompassed several new classrooms on both floors as well as two gymnasiums and a small swimming pool on the ground floor. In the following decades, several portable buildings and other small buildings were built surrounding both the principal building and South Waid.

The Waid Academy received a coat of arms in 1959, approved by the Lord Lyon King of Arms. It was designed by Stewart Lees, teacher of art at the school from 1953 to 1960. The design and motto are based on the carving in stone above the school's main entrance. The coat of arms shows a ship passing between towers or pier heads. The logo is underscribed by the Latin phrase Multi Pertransibunt Et Augebitur Scientia – many will pass through and knowledge will be increased.

A new sports hall and playing fields was opened for the school in 2003. In 2008, Iain Hughes was appointed Rector of the school, after serving as Deputy Rector for many years.

In October 2014 funding was announced for a new £24 million building to be located on the existing school site, then planning consent issued in July 2015. The old school building was closed on 2 June 2017 with the main building been being put up for sale as well as the South Waid building. Most of the various extensions to the rear of the original school building were demolished to provide an all weather sports pitch and additional parking for the newly constructed school. The keys to the new build were handed over on 28 April 2017, with the school officially opening on 12 June 2017.

== Alumni ==
- Edith Bowman – Radio presenter
- Doug Henderson – Labour MP for Newcastle North
- John Lloyd – Journalist, chiefly for the Financial Times.
- Andrew Mackintosh – Actor, portrayed DS Alistair Greig in the long-running ITV drama The Bill.
- George Mudie – Labour MP for Leeds East
- Daniel Sloss – Comedian
- Catherine Steele – Plant biochemist
