= Freuchie Cricket Club =

Team information
- Colours
- Founded: 1908
- Home ground: Freuchie Park
- Official website: Freuchie CC (archived)

The Freuchie Cricket Club is a cricket club based in the village of Freuchie, Scotland. The club was formed in 1908, and with some disruption in the war years, has been going strong ever since. They currently play in the SPCU North East Championship

== Brief history ==
Situated in the Fife village of Freuchie (56°14′52″N 3°9′22″W), Scotland. The cricket club plays a large role in village community life.

The club's greatest moment of popular fame was the victory in the final of the National Village Cup Championship at Lord's in 1985, against a side from Surrey.

In the 1970s, virtually all games were friendlies against other village clubs, with the occasional friendly against one of the “big clubs” from Edinburgh; the club looked on these as major cricketing occasions, while the opponents thought them to be more of a social day out. Today, Freuchie Cricket Club meet these teams on a very competitive basis. Two of the present “home-grown” players have played for Scotland's first team, while others have played at other representative levels.

The 2006 season exemplified this rise in standards when the club began the year by winning the Media Sixes Indoor Six-a-Side tournament and went on to win the SNCL Division II championship with a game to spare. Meanwhile, the Second XI gained promotion from East League Division II, so this coming year sees the club competing in the first divisions of both the Scottish National (SNCL) and the East of Scotland (ESCA) leagues.

The club's Centenary Year was in 2008.
