= Scottish Deer Centre =

Zoo in Fife, Scotland, United Kingdom

- Interactive map of Scottish Deer Centre
- 56°18′15.71″N 3°5′12.96″W
- Date opened: May 1988
- Location: Fife, Scotland, UK
- Land area: 55 acres (22 ha)
- Memberships: BIAZA
- Major exhibits: Deer, wolves, wildcats, bears, birds of prey, otters
- Owner: David Hamilton, Gavin Findlay
- Website: https://scottishdeercentre.co.uk/

The Scottish Deer Centre is a 55-acre (22 ha) zoological park near Cupar in Fife, Scotland.

The attraction is set on the estate of Over Rankeilour, at the former Over Rankeilour Farm close to the hamlet of the Bow of Fife. Opened in 1988 by the farm's owners, the centre attracted over 70,000 visitors in 2019, making it Fife's second most popular paid attraction behind St Andrews Castle. While opened primarily as a working deer farm with entertainment for the public, it now focuses on conservation, education and research as a member of BIAZA.

The Scottish Deer Centre is home to 12 species of deer, as well as Eurasian wolves, Scottish wildcats, Eurasian brown bears, Eurasian otters and local wildlife. It also contains a bird of prey centre which offers daily shows, tours and experiences. A cafe, gift shop, and several activities such as go-karting are also available.

== History ==
The idea of the Scottish Deer Centre was conceived around a year prior to its opening by Ian and Evelyn Crombie - owners of Over Rankeilour Farm - and John and Nichola Fletcher, farmers from nearby Reediehill Farm in Auchtermuchty. In order to transform 55 acres of the Rankeilour estate into a tourist attraction, funding was received from the Scottish Tourist Board with the hopes of garnering around 50,000 visitors per year.

In 1988, the centre opened with visitor attractions, including a shop and exhibition centre, based mainly in the Georgian courtyard of the farm. A restaurant also opened in December of the same year under the name "Staggies".

The Scottish Deer Centre was sold to Edinburgh Woollen Mill in 1996 after being put up for sale by founders Ian and Evelyn Crombie who wanted to move onto new ventures. This led to a greater focus on the tourism side of the business, including renovations and extensions to customer-facing aspects of the property. Birds of prey had been added to the ever-growing number of attractions by this time.

The British and Irish Association of Zoos and Aquariums granted the centre membership in 2011, shifting the focus from entertainment and amusement to education, research and conservation as a result.

As a result of the COVID-19 pandemic and its economic impact, several workers at the Scottish Deer Centre were made redundant by Edinburgh Woollen Mill, leading to backlash from locals and politicians. Despite direct pleas to the owner, Philip Day, the business refused to rehire these workers (which would enable them to receive furlough) as Edinburgh Woollen Mill did not anticipate that the workers could return after the pandemic. The entirety of Edinburgh Woollen Mill was struggling at this point, and in November 2020 the company was placed into administration.

In May 2021, businessmen David Hamilton - co-founder of Digital Goldfish, a Dundee-based game studio sold to Ninja Kiwi - and Gavin Findlay - director of Dundee-based G2 Scaffolding - bought the Scottish Deer Centre for an undisclosed sum, bringing it out of administration. Both having young children who enjoy visiting the park, they contacted administrators after learning of its uncertain future.

The two entrepreneurs invested into multiple new attractions for the centre, including a nursery, new animals such as arctic foxes, a fire engine and a Blackburn Buccaneer jet.
