= Kingdom Housing Association =

Kingdom Housing Association is a not-for-profit organisation which works throughout east central Scotland to provide housing for single people, families, older people and people who have special needs.
