= Donna Ferriero =

American academic

- Education: Rutgers University; University of California-San Francisco; Tufts; Massachusetts General Hospital
- Known for: Studying neonatal hypoxic ischemic encephalopathy and pathophysiology of early brain injury Past President, Child Neurology Society; Past President, American Pediatric Society; Former Chair of Pediatrics of University of California-San Francisco and Physician-in-Chief of USCF Benioff Children’s Hospital
- Awards: American Academy of Neurology Sidney Carter Award for excellence in Child Neurology, 2006; American Pediatric Society Mary Ellen Avery Research Award, 2024; Child Neurology Society Roger and Mary Brumback Lifetime Achievement Award
- Scientific career
- Fields: Neurology, pediatrics
- Workplaces: University of California - San Francisco

Donna Ferriero is Distinguished Professor, emeritus, of the Departments of Neurology and Pediatrics at the University of California-San Francisco. From 2010 to 2017, she was Chair of the Department of Pediatrics and Physician-in-Chief of UCSF Benioff Children’s Hospital. She has published over 300 peer-reviewed publications and is an internationally recognized expert in neonatal neurology.

== Early life and education ==
Ferriero studied zoology at Rutgers University, then obtained a master's degree in immunology. She then worked as a research assistant, studying the mechanism of olfaction, before going to medical school at the University of California-San Francisco. She completed two years of pediatrics residency at Tufts and Massachusetts General Hospital, then returned to the University of California-San Francisco for three years of child neurology residency. She remained at UCSF for a two-year post-doctoral fellowship under Stephen Sagar.

== Career and research ==
When Ferriero was appointed assistant professor at UCSF, she began working with Roger P. Simon, a neurologist who had created a model of adult hypoxic-ischemic encephalopathy (HIE). Together they created a rodent model of neonatal HIE.

This allowed Ferriero to study oxidative stress following asphyxia in a developing brain. In adult animal models, overexpression of the antioxidant superoxide dismutase (SOD) prevented injury from ischemic stroke, but overexpression of SOD increased injury in Ferriero’s neonatal model. From this research, Ferriero determined that after initial injury due to asphyxia or stroke, a secondary phase of inflammation and oxidative stress caused increased cell death in neonates due to a lack of antioxidant reserves.

Ferriero studies therapeutic hypothermia as a method of protecting the brain during the secondary phase after injury and is known for refining the technique and promoting it throughout neonatal intensive care units, including trials of isolated cooling of the head (CoolCap). She has developed a model of neonatal ischemic stroke and studies inflammation and stem cell migration in this model.

== Education and Mentorship ==
Ferriero is known as a strong teacher and mentor. She has won many teaching awards during her years at UCSF. She was awarded the UCSF Chancellor’s Award for the Advancement of Women, and the Maureen Andrew Mentor Award from the Society for Pediatric Research, for her strong commitment to mentorship.

== Awards and honors ==
- Member of the National Academy of Medicine, 2005
- Bernard Sachs Award, Child Neurology Society, 2006
- Royer Award for Excellence in Academic Neurology, 2007
- President, Child Neurology Society, 2009
- Elected to the Association of American Physicians, 2011
- Elected to the American Academy of Arts and Sciences, 2013
- President, American Pediatric Society, 2014
- American Pediatric Society Mary Ellen Avery Research Award, 2024
- Child Neurology Society Roger and Mary Brumback Lifetime Achievement Award, 2024
- Associate Editor, Pediatric Research
- Associate Editor, Annals of Neurology (2005–2013)
- Consulting Editor, Stroke (2013–2018)
- Editor, Swaiman's Pediatric Neurology: Principles and Practice
