= Adrian Magson =

British novelist

Adrian Magson is a British novelist.

== Books ==
- No Help for the Dying
- The Bid
- The Locker
- Death on the Marais
- Red Station
