= Matt Hilton =

Matt Hilton is a British novelist known for his crime fiction. He is the author of multiple book series, including the Joe Hunter thriller series and the Tess Grey thriller series. His debut novel Dead Men's Dust was published in 2009.

== Books ==
- Dead Men's Dust
- Raw Wounds
- Painted Skins
