= Bell Baxter High School =

School in Cupar, Fife, Scotland

Location
- Carslogie Road; Cupar, Fife, KY15 4HY; United Kingdom; 56.3172°N 3.0293°W

Information
- Type: Secondary School
- Mottoes: Latin: Ad Vitam Paror (I am being prepared for life); The future is in our hands
- Established: 28 May 1889
- Rector: Lynn Black
- Staff: 100 +
- Gender: Mixed
- Age: 11 to 18
- Enrolment: 1530
- Houses: Bell, Baxter and Howe
- Colours: White, Navy & Black
- School years: S1-S6
- Website: https://bellbaxterhighschool.org.uk/

Bell Baxter High School is a non-denominational comprehensive school for 11 to 18 year olds in Cupar, Fife, Scotland. Founded in 1889, it educates over 1,500 pupils mainly from the surrounding villages.

The school is one of 18 secondary schools under the authority of Fife Council, and is led by rector Lynn Black with the support of a senior leadership team. Bell Baxter takes its name from donors Dr Andrew Bell, creator of the Madras system, and businessman Sir David Baxter. The school's history can be traced back to institutions dating from around 1635.

== School history ==
Originally Bell-Baxter School, Bell Baxter High School was founded in 1889 when Rev. Andrew Bell's Madras Academy combined with Sir David Baxter's Institute for Young Ladies, taking the name of its joint founders.

The earliest roots of Bell Baxter can be traced back to around 1635, in the form of the Grammar School of Cupar. The school became Cupar Academy in 1727 after some reorganisation, and remained as such until 1831 when an endowment from Bell led to the adoption of the name Madras Academy. Madras Academy was one of two schools left money by Bell in the North East Fife area which adopted his Madras system, the other being Madras College in his home town of St Andrews.

Originally, secondary education was to be delivered at the former Institute for Young Ladies' Westport building, and elementary education from the former Madras Academy's Castlehill site. The oldest part of the Westport building was first used in 1890, with the rest of the building being built in 1929.

However, the school quickly outgrew these premises, and in 1959 a new building was commissioned on Carslogie Road under a 5-year Fife school-building programme. During the interim period, a number of wooden huts were utilised as classrooms due to the large number of pupils. By 1962, the new building had opened to senior pupils, resulting in a three-quarters of a mile commute for some teachers and pupils between the two sites.

As a result of continuous renovation work which drastically extended and transformed the building, the school was able to be consolidated at the Carslogie Road site in 2010. The Westport Road building has since been demolished, with 30 affordable homes and a business centre constructed on the site. Only the facade of the main building remains along with St Michael's Church adjacent to the school.

On 13 January 2020, a fire unexpectedly started on school premises which subsequently resulted in Scottish Fire and Rescue Service being called to quell the blaze which caused sizable property damage. There were no injuries however, Police Scotland believe that the fire was no accident.

== Coat of Arms ==
The school's coat of arms features, at the top of the shield, the Thane of Fife to represent Fife Council's control of the school. This is accompanied below by the three Myrtle Crowns of Cupar on the left, and a coat representing Bell and Baxter on the right. In a scroll over this, the school's motto - "Ad Vitam Paror".

== Management ==
From 2007 to 2018, the rector of the school was Philip Black, who then embarked on a secondment to Fife Council which later became a full time job and led to his retirement.

Due to Black's resignation, the acting rector became Elizabeth Smart, head of Waid Academy, who took lead until Carol Ann Penrose - former head of Lochgelly High School - was appointed as the new rector of Bell Baxter High School.

On 11 November 2021, Penrose resigned after much speculation leaving many parents feeling 'left in the dark' due to the unusual timing and the lack of notice. Smart was once again appointed acting rector while also leading Waid Academy until a new permanent rector was found.

A new rector was due to be appointed for the start of 2022; however, this was later postponed, and it was not until the end of the school year in June before it was announced that Beeslack High School head Lynn Black would take over permanently after an interim period under Craig Parnham, a depute rector at Woodmill High School.

=== Rectors ===
- 1889–1903 Dr Peter McDougall
- 1903–1919 John M Dawson
- 1919–1937 William Douglas
- 1937–1945 George W J Farquharson
- 1945–1946 Dr Alexander Inglis (acting)
- 1946–1966 Dr James E Dunlop
- 1966–1984 Dr Alexander McLaren
- 1984–2007 Douglas Campbell
- 2007–2018 Philip Black
- 2018–2018 Elizabeth Smart (acting)
- 2018–2021 Carol Ann Penrose
- 2021–2022 Elizabeth Smart (acting)
- 2022–2022 Craig Parnham (acting)
- 2022– Lynn Black

== Notable former pupils ==
- Sir Alasdair Breckenridge, Fellow of the Royal College of Physicians both of London and of Edinburgh, a Fellow of the Royal Society of Edinburgh and a founding Fellow of the Academy of Medical Sciences.
- Reverend Robert Craig former Moderator of the Church of Scotland
- Reverend Professor Robert Davidson former Moderator of the Church of Scotland
- Chris Fusaro, Scotland rugby international, winner of the 2007 Schools Cup for Bell Baxter
- William Heggie, first-class cricketer
- Fergus Thomson, Scotland rugby international
- George Horne, Scotland rugby international
- Peter Horne, Scotland rugby international, winner of the 2007 Schools Cup for Bell Baxter
- Stevie May, Scottish football international, SFWA Young Player of the Year 2013/14 and currently at St Johnstone FC.
- Sheli McCoy, weightlifter and 'Sabre' on Gladiators
- Rab Noakes, a Scottish singer-songwriter.
- Karen Petrie, academic from the University of Dundee and inventor of the Petrie Multiplier.
- The Proclaimers, Scottish folk-rock musicians
- Sir Bob Reid, former Chief Executive of Shell and Chairman of the British Railways Board from 1990 until 1995
- Dale Reid, one of the most successful golfers in the history of the Ladies European Tour.
- Willie Rennie, MSP and former leader of the Scottish Liberal Democrats
- Sir Robert Robertson, chemist
- David Rollo, former Scotland rugby player.
- Allan Stewart (politician), MP and Scottish Office Minister.
- Stewart Stevenson, SNP MSP for Banffshire and Buchan Coast and previously Minister for Environment and Climate Change in the Scottish Government.
- Sir Garnet Wilson, politician and Lord Provost of Dundee
