= Cupar Burgh Chambers =

Municipal Building in Cupar, Scotland

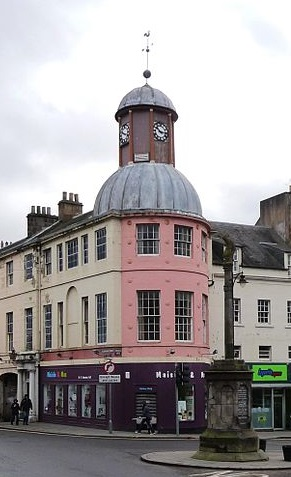
- Cupar Burgh Chambers

- Shown in Fife
- 56.3193°N 3.0113°W
- Location: St Catherine Street, Cupar

History
- Built: 1817

Site notes
- Architect: Robert Hutchison
- Architectural style: Neoclassical style

Listed Building – Category B
- Official name: Town Hall, 5 St Catherine Street, Cupar
- Designated: 1 February 1972
- Reference no.: LB24156

Cupar Burgh Chambers is a municipal structure in St Catherine Street in Cupar, Fife, Scotland. The building, which was the meeting place of Cupar Burgh Council, is a Category B listed building.

== History ==
The first municipal building in the town was a medieval tolbooth which stood at The Cross and which dated back at least to the first half of the 15th century. The tolbooth incorporated prison cells on the ground floor and an assembly room on the first floor. King Charles II was entertained in the assembly room on his journey to Falkland in July 1650, and the aeronaut, Vincenzo Lunardi, was carried there in triumph after crossing the Firth of Forth in a hot-air balloon, in December 1785.

By the early 19th century, the tolbooth had become dilapidated and the provost, John Ferguson, proposed that the tolbooth and an adjacent property, Balgarvie House, be demolished as part of an initiative to create a new street: the south side of the new street would contain various civic buildings including, at the west end, the burgh chambers and, further to the east, the county buildings and the sheriff court. Demolition of the tolbooth took place one night in April 1815: the work caused some consternation because not all the burgh leaders had agreed to the proposal. The new building was designed by Robert Hutchison in the neoclassical style, built in ashlar stone for £150 and was completed in 1817. The design involved a semi-circular section with three bays facing onto The Cross; the first and second floors featured sash windows in each of the three bays. The whole section was surmounted by a lead-covered dome, an octagonal belfry with a domed roof and a weather vane. On the north façade, while most of the ground floor was occupied by shops, there was a pend in the centre of the building and, to its right, a doorway with a fanlight, flanked by Doric order columns supporting an entablature, which gave access to the burgh chambers above.

The mercat cross was relocated from Wemyss Hall Hill to a site just to the east of the burgh chambers as part of the celebrations for the Diamond Jubilee of Queen Victoria in 1897. The building continued to serve as the headquarters of the burgh council for much of the 20th century, but ceased to be the local seat of government after the enlarged North East Fife District Council was formed further along the road at the county buildings in 1975. The burgh chambers continued to be used as workspace by council staff, but after Fife Council became the unitary authority for the area in 1996, the building then fell vacant and, after significantly deteriorating, was placed on the Buildings at Risk Register for Scotland.

An extensive programme of works to refurbish the burgh chambers to a design by Arc Architects was carried out at a cost of £571,000 and completed in August 2018. The works, which were carried out under the management of Fife Historic Buildings Trust and financed by the Heritage Lottery Fund, Historic Environment Scotland and Fife Council, involved converting the first and second floors into apartments for tourists.

== See also ==
- List of listed buildings in Cupar, Fife
