= Cornelia Boldyreff =

British computer scientist

Cornelia Boldyreff is a British computer scientist. She is very active in encouraging girls into computing, is a Council Member of The BCS, The Chartered Institute of IT (previously British Computer Society ), a Committee member of the BCSWomen and a visiting professor in the School of Computing and Mathematical Sciences at the University of Greenwich in London.

== Academic posts ==
- February 2013 to date visiting professor, School of Computing and Mathematical Sciences, University of Greenwich
- 2009–2013 Associate dean (research and enterprise), School of Architecture, Computing and Engineering at the University of East London
- 2004 Professor of software engineering, University of Lincoln
- Reader, Computer Science Department, University of Durham

== Academic and professional qualifications ==
- Fellow of the British Computer Society
- Fellow of the Higher Education Academy
- PhD in Software Engineering, University of Durham
- Member of the Association for Computing Machinery (ACM)
- Member of the IEEE Computer Society
- Member of British Federation of Women Graduates (BFWG)

== Centres, specialist groups and committees ==
- Co-founder and Director, Centre for Research in Open Source Software.
- Founding member of BCS Women Specialist Group
- Committee member, BCS e-Learning Specialist Group
- Chair BCS Open Source Specialist Group
- Grants committee of Funds for Women Graduates (FfWG)

== Reviewing and programme committee work ==
- EPSRC Peer Review College
- Programme Committee/Organising Committee for various conferences/workshops

== Recent journal papers ==
1. Mariano Ceccato, Andrea Capiluppi, Paolo Falcarin, Cornelia Boldyreff, A Large Study on the Effect of Code Obfuscation on the Quality of Java Code, Journal of Empirical Software Engineering, (under review).
2. Andrea Capiluppi, Paolo Falcarin and Cornelia Boldyreff, Decompile, Defactor, Decouple: Measuring the Obfuscation Tirade to Protect Software Systems, Journal of Software Evolution and Process, Wiley (invited paper for special issue – under review).
3. Andrea Capiluppi, Klaas-Jan Stol, Cornelia Boldyreff: Software Reuse in Open Source: A Case Study. IJOSSP 3(3): 10-35 (2011)
4. Andrea Capiluppi, Cornelia Boldyreff, Karl Beecher, Paul J. Adams: Quality Factors and Coding Standards – a Comparison Between Open Source Forges. Electr. Notes Theor. Comput. Sci. 233: 89-103 (2009)
5. Karl Beecher, Andrea Capiluppi, Cornelia Boldyreff: Identifying exogenous drivers and evolutionary stages in FLOSS projects. Journal of Systems and Software 82(5): 739-750 (2009)

== Awards ==
- Cornelia Boldyreff was one of the 30 women identified in the BCS Women in IT Campaign in 2014. Who were then featured in the e-book "Women in IT: Inspiring the next generation" produced by the BCS, The Chartered Institute for IT, as a free downloade-book, from various sources.
