= William Heggie =

Scottish cricketer

Personal information
- Full name: William Robert Heggie
- Born: 10 August 1914; Cupar, Fife, Scotland
- Died: 10 August 1985 (aged 71); Paisley, Renfrewshire, Scotland
- Batting: Right-handed

Domestic team information
- Years: Team
- 1937–1947: Scotland

Career statistics
Competition	First-class
Matches	5
Runs scored	123
Batting average	12.30
100s/50s	–/–
Top score	44
Catches/stumpings	2/–
- Source: Cricinfo, 19 June 2022

William Robert Heggie (10 August 1914 — 10 August 1985) was a Scottish first-class cricketer.

Heggie was born at Cupar in August 1914 and was educated in the town at Bell Baxter High School. Initially playing his club cricket in Fifeshire, Heggie made his debut for Scotland in a first-class cricket match against Ireland at Belfast in 1937, with him making a further appearance in that season against the touring New Zealanders at Glasgow. His third appearance came the following season against Ireland at Glasgow. Heggie returned to the Scottish side following the Second World War, playing two further first-class matches against Ireland in 1946 and 1947. He scored 123 runs in his five first-class matches at an average of 12.30, with a highest score of 44. He joined Greenock Cricket Club in 1946, and succeeded John Drummond as club captain in 1949; however, his captaincy lasted a matter of weeks as a persistent shoulder injury forced him to retire. Outside of cricket, he was a sales administrator by profession. Heggie died at Paisley on his 71st birthday in 1985.
