= John Finlayson =

John Finlayson may refer to:

- John Harvey Finlayson (1843–1915), editor and part-owner of the South Australian Register
- John Finlaison (born John Finlayson, 1783–1860), Scottish government actuary, first president of the Institute of Actuaries
- John Finlayson (disciple) (1770–1854), Scottish writer, London "house agent", disciple of Richard Brothers
- John Finlayson (engraver) (1730–1776), English engraver
- John Finlayson (politician) (1890–1960), member of the New Zealand Legislative Council
