= Sue Black (computer scientist) =

British computer scientist

Sue Black OBE FRSA
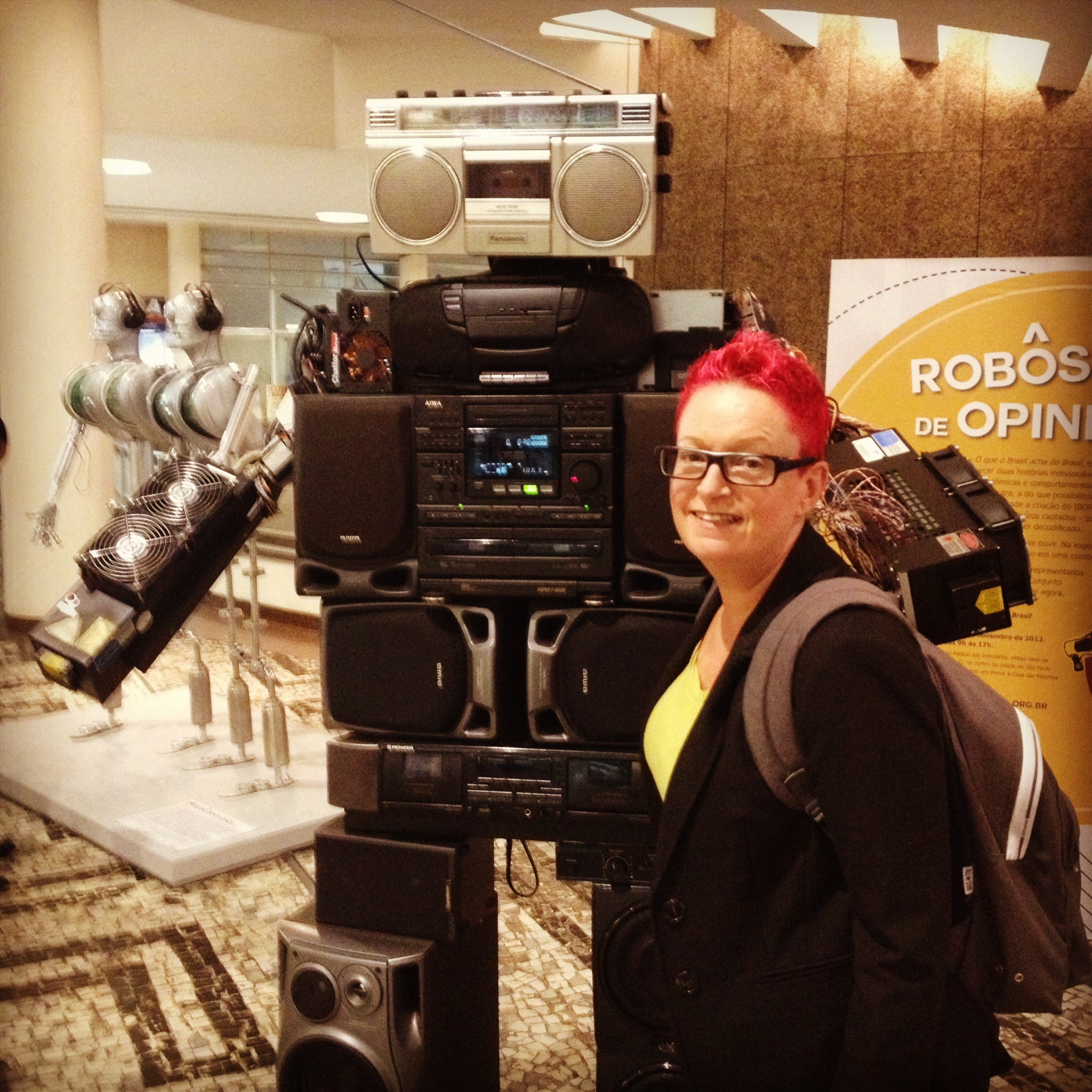
- Sue Black in 2012
- Born: Susan Elizabeth Black; 1962 (age 63–64); Fareham, Hampshire, England
- Education: London South Bank University (PhD)
- Known for: Saving Bletchley Park
- Awards: John Ivinson Award (2009)
- Scientific career
- Fields: Software engineering; Social media; Women in tech; Bletchley Park; Twitter
- Workplaces: University College London; University of Westminster; Durham University
- Thesis: Computation of Ripple Effect Measures for Software (2001)
- Doctoral advisor: Robin Whitty
- Sue Black's voice recorded February 2013
- Website: sueblack.co.uk

Susan Elizabeth Black (born 1962) is a British computer scientist, academic and social entrepreneur. She is known for saving Bletchley Park, (World War II codebreaking) with her Saving Bletchley Park campaign. Since 2018, she has been Professor of Computer Science and Technology Evangelist at Durham University. She was previously based at the University of Westminster and University College London.

== Early life and education ==
Sue Black was born in 1962 in Fareham, Hampshire. She left school and home at 16, the earliest legal age. She married at 20 and soon had three children.

After her husband forced Black and her children out, she sought safety at a local women's refuge. She began a maths access course at night school that led to enrolling in undergraduate degree. Black graduated with a bachelor's degree in computing from London South Bank University in 1993, and obtained her PhD in software engineering in 2001 for research on the ripple effect supervised by Robin Whitty

== Career and research ==
Black was previously Head of the Department of Information and Software Systems at the University of Westminster, and senior research associate at University College London (UCL). Since 2018, she has been Professor of Computer Science and Technology Evangelist at Durham University, and an honorary professor at UCL.

She was the founding chair of the British Computer Society (BCS) Specialist Group BCSWomen, serving from 2001 until 2008. She is an advocate of women in computing.

=== Campaigns ===
Black ran a successful campaign over several years to secure funding for the restoration of Bletchley Park, the UK World War II centre for decrypting enemy messages. In 2003 she started raising awareness of the site by creating a blog, after visiting the site and noting the appalling condition of the buildings, seeing the Bombe machine being rebuilt, and hearing that over 10,000 people had worked there during the war. The photograph of one of the huts with a blue tarpaulin protecting the deteriorating structure helped galvanise interest and activism among concerned computer scientists. The initial outreach was followed up with an active Twitter presence that attracted even more followers and interested parties. Bletchley Park staff also engaged with other Web 2.0 (i.e. user-generated) technologies such as Facebook and Twitter.

At the end of 2015, Black published a book about the process, Saving Bletchley Park, initially funded via Unbound, that became the fastest crowdfunded book of all time.

everywoman says Black "embodies the traits of a modern leader", particularly in regard to social media use. The BBC technology correspondent Rory Cellan-Jones spotted early on that Black was making sophisticated use of Twitter (and other platforms) in her campaigning.

Black set up Techmums, reaching out to mothers who wanted to understand what their children were up to online. Techmums offers free training in digital security, social media, the programming language Python, and so on, with the aim of increasing the women's confidence, breaking down the digital divide, and helping them escape poverty. The pilot programme was held at Bishop Challoner Catholic Collegiate School in London Borough of Tower Hamlets. Techmums describes itself as "an e-skills accredited program of short, hands-on workshops" with a supportive online community.

Black has appeared on BBC television, radio and in press articles. She was interviewed by Jim Al-Khalili for The Life Scientific first broadcast in 2019 and was a guest on BBC Radio 4's Desert Island Discs.

=== Politics ===
In March 2019 the Women's Equality Party announced that Black would be their candidate in the 2020 election for Mayor of London. In February 2020, it was announced that Black was withdrawing as the party's candidate for health reasons, and was being replaced by Mandu Reid.

=== Awards and honours ===
In 2009 Black won the first John Ivinson Award from the British Computer Society at the Royal Society in London. In 2011 Black won the PepsiCo Women's Inspiration Award. In 2012 she was listed as one of Datamation's 10 Women in Tech Who Give Back.

Black was also one of the 30 women identified in the British Computer Society's Women in IT Campaign in 2014, who were then featured in the e-book "Women in IT: Inspiring the next generation" produced by the BCS.

In 2015 Black was identified as the 7th Most Influential Women in UK IT 2015, by Computer Weekly.

She was appointed Officer of the Order of the British Empire (OBE) in the 2016 New Year Honours for services to technology.

Black was awarded the Social Impact Abie Award from the AnitaB.org in 2017.
