= Gillian Arnold (technologist) =

British Information technology leader

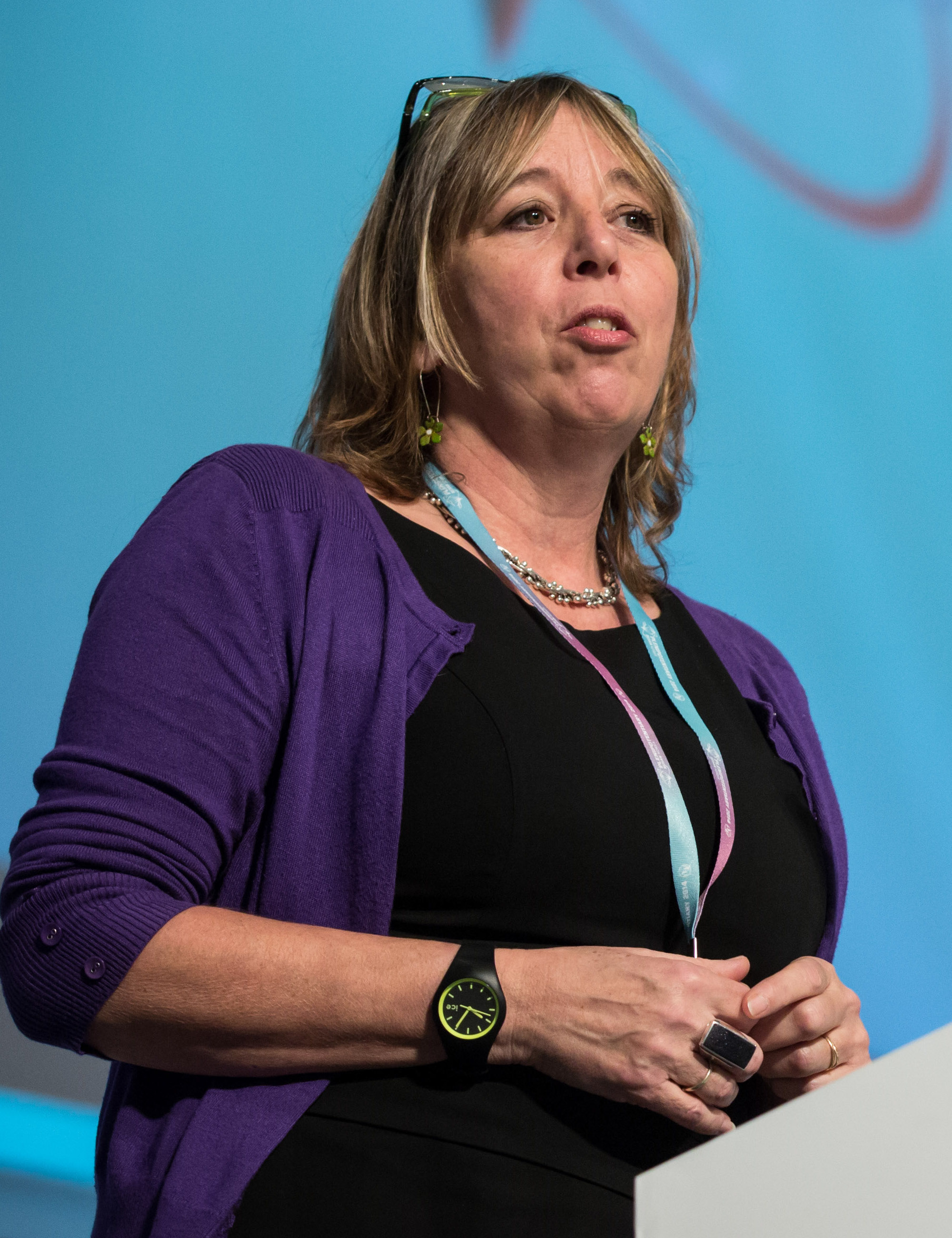
- In 2014
- Scientific career
- Workplaces: IBM; Tectre

Gillian Arnold is a British Information technology leader. She is a BCS Vice President and the Past Chair of the BCSWomen Specialist Group that supports women in the IT industry. In 2015, she was identified as the 9th Most Influential Women in UK IT 2015, by Computer Weekly. In 2016, Arnold was again identified as one of the 50 most influential women in UK IT 2016 by Computer Weekly.

== Career ==
Gillian Arnold was actively involved in the BCS (British Computer Society), The Chartered Institute for IT, and was the elected Chair of the BCSWomen Specialist Group that supports women in the IT industry. Gillian subsequently became a BCS Vice-President and Trustee Director of the BCS Learning & Development Ltd. She subsequently was elected the 63rd (2023/24) President of the Chartered Institute.

Gillian has been a company director since 1984 in the IT sector, this has included wide variety of technical roles, such as managing teams for new products for IT companies including IBM. She worked for 22 years at IBM until setting up her own company called Tectre in 2009.

Gillian Arnold chaired a forum for an IT trade association which is now called techUK and is the Chair of BCSWomen a specialist group which supplies support for female IT Professionals. She was featured in the e-book “Women in IT: Inspiring the next generation” produced by the BCS, The Chartered Institute for IT

== Awards and recognition ==
In 2012 Gillian Arnold was a finalist in the Everywoman in technology awards where she won the inspiration of the year award. She also sits on the board for women in science and engineering (WISE) Gillian was one of the 30 women identified in the BCS Women in IT Campaign in 2014 and has won awards for encouraging women into STEM fields.

Gillian Arnold, Past Chair of BCSWomen was invited to Korea on 27 October 2014 to receive the Gender Equality Main Streaming - Technology (GEM-TECH) award on behalf of the BCS and BCSWomen. This achievement award of the ITU - United Nations Women Joint Award, was for "Promoting Women in ICT Sector" and encouraging women to enter the computing sector and to encourage and support them during their careers.

The University of Bath awarded Arnold an Honorary Doctorate of the University in July 2019. The award recognised her as 'not only a great role model and inspiration for aspiring female IT professionals but for all of us.'
