= Corn Exchange, Cupar =

Commercial building in Cupar, Fife, Scotland

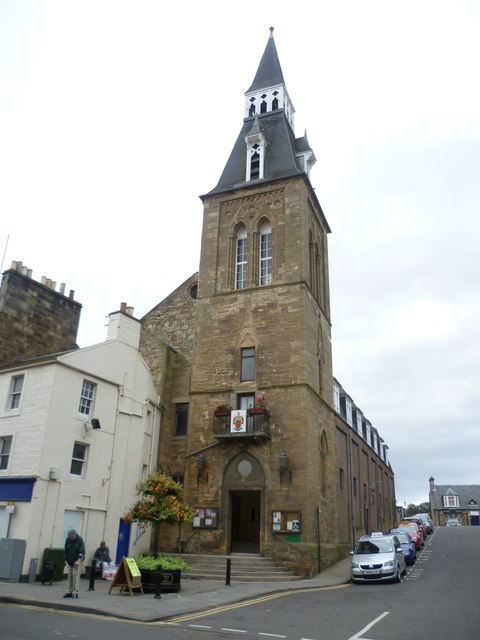
- Corn Exchange, Cupar

- Shown in Fife
- 56.3197°N 3.0112°W
- Location: St Catherine Street, Cupar

History
- Built: 1862

Site notes
- Architect: Campbell Douglas
- Architectural style: Gothic Revival style

Listed Building – Category B
- Official name: The Corn Exchange, Tower Only
- Designated: 1 February 1972
- Reference no.: LB24165

The Corn Exchange is a commercial building in the St Catherine Street, Cupar, Fife, Scotland. The structure, which is now used as a community events venue, is a Category B listed building.

== History ==
In the late-1850s, a group of local businessmen decided to form a private company, known as the "Cupar Corn Exchange Company", to finance and commission a corn exchange for the town. One of the early subscribers, in September 1959, was the Lord Chancellor, John Campbell, 1st Baron Campbell. The site they selected was on the corner of St Catherine Street and Castlehill.

The foundation stone for the new building was laid in August 1861. It was designed by Campbell Douglas in the Gothic Revival style, built in rubble masonry at a cost of £4,000 and was completed in 1862. The design involved a four-stage tower facing onto St Catherine Street. The first stage featured a square headed doorway set in an arched recess flanked by cast iron lanterns, the second stage involved a French door and a balcony and the third stage involved a casement window with ogee-shaped carvings above, while the fourth stage involved a pair of mullioned windows. The tower was surmounted by a spire with lucarnes. The Castlehill elevation, which extended back for seven bays, was built in a plainer style and was fenestrated with small square windows on the ground floor and with dormer windows at attic level. Internally, the principal room was the main hall which was 90 feet (27 m) long and 50 feet (15 m) wide. The spire, at 136 feet (41 m) high, became a dominant feature on the local skyline.

A grand concert, held under the patronage of the 1st Forfarshire Light Horse Volunteer Corps, which had been raised in spring 1870, was held in the building on 12 July 1870. The use of the building as a corn exchange declined significantly in the wake of the Great Depression of British Agriculture in the late 19th century. Instead, it became a community events venue hosting a variety of festivals, fairs, and concerts. It was acquired by Cupar Town Council in 1961 and the dormant company, which had developed the corn exchange, was acquired, together with its books and records, by Cupar Heritage in 2016.

== See also ==
- List of listed buildings in Cupar, Fife
