= Ian Gent =

British computer scientist

Ian Philip Gent
- Education: University of Cambridge, University of Warwick
- Scientific career
- Fields: Computer science
- Workplaces: University of St Andrews
- Thesis: Analytic proof systems for classical and modal logics of restricted quantification (1992)
- Doctoral advisor: Tony Cohn
- Website: ipg.host.cs.st-andrews.ac.uk

Ian Gent is a British computer scientist working in the area of artificial intelligence and specialising in the area of constraint programming. He is a professor at the University of St Andrews. He (along with Toby Walsh) first wrote about the phase transition in many NP complete problems, in particular SAT. He was also one of the first researchers to investigate full generic methods to handle symmetry in constraint programming.

Gent founded recomputation.org, to promote reproducible experiments in computer science.

He was one of the founders of the csplib.org website, and popularised the Petrie Multiplier.

In January 2013 Gent founded the blog Depressed Academics with Mikael Vejdemo-Johansson.
