= County Buildings, Cupar =

County building in Cupar, Scotland

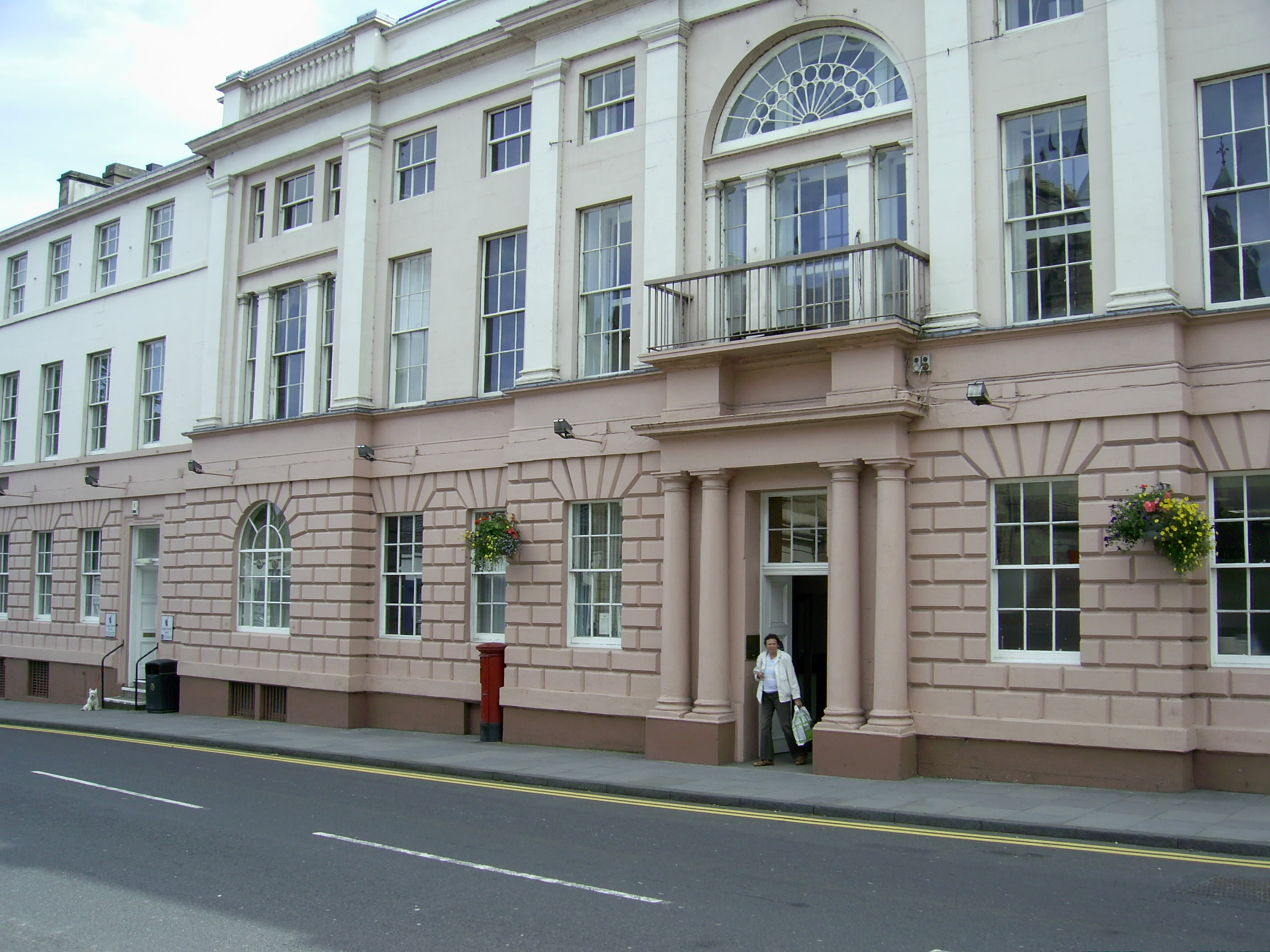
- County Buildings, Cupar

- Shown in Fife
- 56.3194°N 3.0099°W
- Location: St Catherine Street, Cupar

History
- Built: 1817

Site notes
- Architect: Robert Hutchison
- Architectural style: Neoclassical style

Listed Building – Category B
- Official name: County Buildings and former Court House, excluding 4-storey offices and police station adjoining to rear and single storey block to east, St Catherine Street, Cupar
- Designated: 1 February 1972
- Reference no.: LB24160

County Buildings is a municipal structure in St Catherine Street in Cupar, Fife, Scotland. The building, which was the meeting place of Fife County Council, is a Category B listed building.

== History ==
In the early 19th century, the provost, John Ferguson, proposed that the old tolbooth and an adjacent property, Balgarvie House, be demolished as part of an initiative to create a new street: the south side of the new street would contain various civic buildings including, at the west end, the new burgh chambers and, further to the east, the county buildings and the sheriff court. The new county buildings was designed by Robert Hutchison in the neoclassical style, built in ashlar stone with a stucco finish and was completed in 1817.

The design involved a symmetrical main frontage with nineteen bays facing onto St Catherine Street. The central section of nine bays featured, in the central bay, a doorway flanked by pairs of Doric order columns supporting an entablature and a balcony: on the first floor there was a three-light window divided by Doric order pilasters and surmounted by a Diocletian window. The outer bays of the central block, which slightly projected forward, featured round headed windows on the ground floor, three-light windows separated by Doric order pilasters on the first floor and smaller three-light windows on the second floor. The other bays in the central block as well as the bays in the outer blocks were fenestrated using a regular pattern of sash windows. Internally, the principal rooms were the council chamber on the first floor of the central block and the county courtroom on the first floor of the east block.

For much of the 19th century the complex had been used as the local facility for dispensing justice but, following the implementation of the Local Government (Scotland) Act 1889, which established county councils in every county, it also became the offices of Fife County Council. After the responsibilities of the county council increased, an additional nine-bay block was erected to the east of the existing complex: it was built to a design by Thoms and Wilkie of Dundee in a similar style but without the stucco finish and was completed in 1925.

Following the abolition of the county council in 1975, the building became the offices and meeting place of North East Fife District Council. The building was briefly shared with Fife Regional Council until that council moved to Fife House in Glenrothes later in 1975. North-East Fife District Council was abolished in 1996, when Fife Council became the unitary authority for the area, with its headquarters at Glenrothes. Since then, the county buildings have been Fife Council's customer service centre for the local area.

Works of art in the county buildings include a portrait by John Shackleton of King George II, a portrait by an unknown artist of King George III and a portrait by Allan Ramsay of Queen Charlotte. Paintings of other nobles include a portrait by Henry Raeburn of John Hope, 4th Earl of Hopetoun, a portrait by Francis Grant of James Bruce, 8th Earl of Elgin and a portrait by David Wilkie of Thomas Erskine, 9th Earl of Kellie as well as a portrait by Sir William Llewellyn of Sir Ralph William Anstruther, 6th Baronet.

== See also ==
- List of listed buildings in Cupar, Fife
