= Cupar Arts Festival =

Biennial arts festival in Cupar, Scotland

Cupar Arts Festival is a biennial arts festival that takes place in Cupar, Scotland for twelve days in October. More than 10,000 visitors are expected to attend the 2013 festival, which will feature 40 artists from around the world and was welcomed in the Scottish Parliament.
