= Hannah Dee =

British computer scientist

Hannah Dee MBE
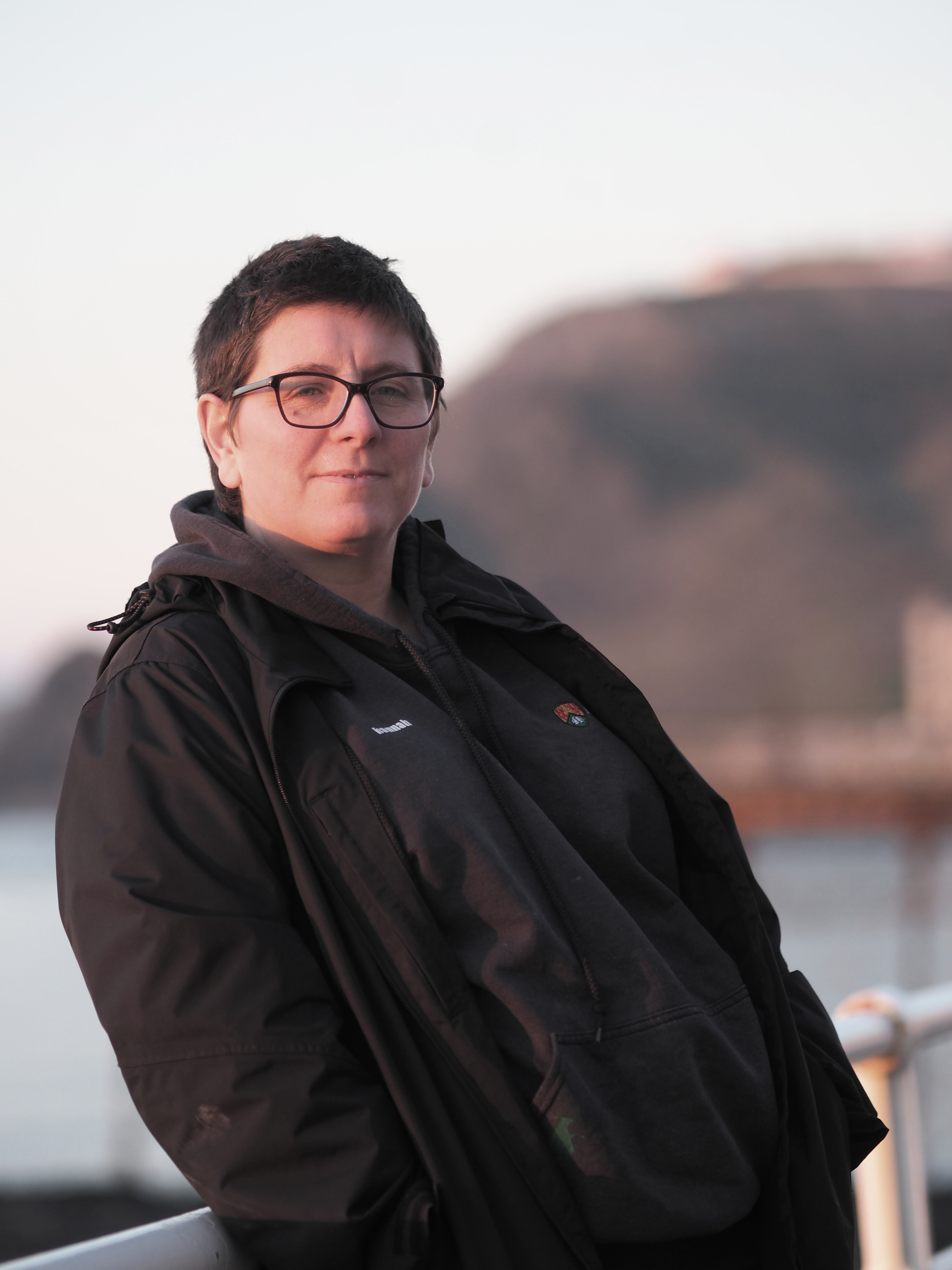
- A photograph of Hannah Dee, taken in Aberystwyth, in February 2021.
- Born: Hannah-Mary Dee
- Education: University of Leeds (BSc, MA, PhD)
- Awards: Suffrage Science award (2018)
- Scientific career
- Fields: Computer Science; Cognitive Science
- Workplaces: Aberystwyth University
- Thesis: Explaining visible behaviour (2005)
- Website: users.aber.ac.uk/hmd1/

Hannah-Mary Dee MBE is a British cognitive scientist and computer scientist specialising in computer vision, with specialisms in plant science, navigation, art, and medical imaging. In 2014, she was one of 30 women identified by the British Computer Society in the "BCS Women in IT Campaign.

Dee has organised many events for women in computing and for broader groups with a women-friendly stance, including an android programming family fun day (materials available in Welsh and in English).

== Education ==
Dee received a BSc in Cognitive Science (1996), an MA in Philosophy (1998), and a PhD in Computing (2005), all from the University of Leeds.

== Career and research ==
Dee has held postdoctoral researcher at Kingston University (2005–2006), University of Leeds (2006–2009), and Institut National Polytechnique de Grenoble (2009–2010). Since 2010, she is a Senior Lecturer in computer science at Aberystwyth University.

She has served deputy chair of her local BCS branch (BCS Mid Wales) since 2011.

Dee developed and runs the annual BCSWomen Lovelace Colloquium, the one-day conference for women and non-binary computing students to encourage networking for women and gender non-conforming students from around the UK, in addition to gaining career development advice from successful women in computing.

Her research interests are in computer vision for the analysis of human behaviour; shadow detection and reasoning; and student attitudes to the study of computer science. She is noted for championing the cause of women in IT.

=== Publications ===
Dee's publications include:

- Roscoe, Dee, Zwiggelaar, Coping with Noise in Ultrasound Images: A review, MIUA 2012
- Ngoc-Son Vu, Hannah M. Dee and Alice Caplier "Face Recognition using the POEM descriptor", Pattern Recognition
- Hannah M. Dee, Cohn, A. G. and Hogg, D. C. "Building semantic scene models from unconstrained video" Volume 116, Issue 3, March 2012, Pages 446.456
- Paul Robson, Michal Mos, Hannah Dee, John Clifton-Brown and Iain Donnison (2011). Improving bioenergy crop yield and quality through manipulating senescence. In: Biomass and Bioenergy Crops IV. Aspects of Applied Biology 112, pp. 323–328.
- Hannah M. Dee & Paulo E. Santos (2011): The Perception and Content of Cast Shadows: An Interdisciplinary Review, Spatial Cognition & Computation, 11:3, 226–25.
- Dee, H. M. and Caplier, A. "Crowd behaviour analysis using histograms of motion direction", IEEE International Conference on Image Processing (ICIP), 2010, Hong Kong.
- Santos, P. E., Dee, H. M. and Fenelon, V. "Knowledge-based adaptative thresholding from shadows" Accepted at the European Conference on Artificial Intelligence (ECAI), 2010, Lisbon, Portugal.

=== Awards and honours ===
In 2014 Dee was featured in the e-book of these 30 women in IT, Women in IT: Inspiring the next generation, produced by the BCS, The Chartered Institute for IT, as a free download e-book, from various sources. In 2016, Dee was identified as one of the 50 most influential women in UK IT 2016 by Computer Weekly.

She was also the voted 15th most influential woman in UK IT 2014, and is active on the Committee of BCSWomen.

In 2015, Dee was identified as the 10th Most Influential Women in UK IT 2015, by Computer Weekly.

In 2018, Dee was added to the Computer Weekly 'Most Influential Women in UK IT' Hall of Fame alongside Chi Onwurah, Sarah Wood and Sherry Coutu. Hannah Dee started in 2008, the BCSWomen Lovelace Colloquium which is the UK's main conference for female undergraduates, and was the Chair 10 years, then having the role of Deputy Chair of the Colloquium

In June 2024, Dee was awarded Member of the Order of the British Empire (MBE) in King Charles' Birthday Honours List in recognition of her services to 'Technology and to Women in the Information Technology Sector'.
