= BCSWomen =

Specialist Group of the British Computer Society

BCSWomen is a Specialist Group of the British Computer Society, The Chartered Institute for IT, that provides networking opportunities for all BCS professional women working in IT around the world, as well as mentoring and encouraging girls and women to enter or return to IT as a career.

== Background ==
Founded by Sue Black, BCSWomen has the aim of supporting women working in and considering a career in Information Technology. The group was founded in 2001. It has more than a thousand members and an active mailing list. Activities include meetings, networking, and mentoring. They also organise the Lovelace Colloquium. Many BCSWomen also participate in the annual London Hopper Colloquium, which showcases exciting work of women in computing research and enables new PhD researchers to meet with each other as well as with senior women computer scientists. Grace Hopper was a pioneering American computer scientist. BCSWomen organise other events for women in computing both technical and social, such as day trips to computer-related sites such as Bletchley Park.

== Lovelace Colloquium ==
The Lovelace Colloquium for undergraduate and post-graduate women and non-binary individuals in digital and computing, is a two-day conference which started in Leeds in 2008. The event is hosted around the UK, at universities and higher education institutions. Named in honour of Ada Lovelace, who is often regarded as the first computer programmer, the colloquium is a showcase for U.K. university women and non-binary students studying computing and related subjects, and focuses on their areas of digital interest. It was started by Hannah Dee MBE, who continues to play a key role in its organisation every year.

== Awards ==
Gillian Arnold, Chair of BCSWomen, was invited to Korea on 27 October 2014 to receive the Gender Equality Main Streaming - Technology (GEM-TECH) award on behalf of the BCS and BCSWomen. This achievement award of the ITU - United Nations Women Joint Award, was for "Promoting Women in ICT Sector" and encouraging women to enter the computing sector and to encourage and support them during their careers.

== Current and past chairs ==
- 2001–2008 Sue Black
- 2008–2011 Karen Petrie
- 2011–2015 Gillian Arnold
- 2015–2020 Sarah Burnett
  - 2017: Deputy Chair Sharon Moore
- 2020-2025 Andrea Palmer
- 2025–2026 Tristi Tanaka
- 2026–Present Jo Stansfield

== See also ==
- Women in computing
