= List of listed buildings in Cupar, Fife =

This is a list of listed buildings in the parish of Cupar in Fife, Scotland.

== List ==
| Name | Location | Date listed | Grid ref. (Note: Sometimes known as OSGB36, the grid reference (where provided) is based on the British national grid reference system used by the Ordnance Survey. • "Guide to National Grid". Ordnance Survey. • "Get-a-map". Ordnance Survey.) | Geo-coordinates | Notes | LB number (Note: Historic Environment Scotland assign a unique alphanumeric identifier to each designated site in Scotland, for listed buildings this always begins with "LB", for example "LB12345".) | Image |
|---|---|---|---|---|---|---|---|
| 116-120 Bonnygate | | | | 56°19′09″N 3°01′01″W | Category C(S) | 24271 | Upload Photo |
| 7 Provost Wynd | | | | 56°19′04″N 3°00′55″W | Category C(S) | 24281 | Upload Photo |
| 16 Provost Wynd | | | | 56°19′05″N 3°00′55″W | Category C(S) | 24285 | Upload Photo |
| 15-25 St Catherine Street | | | | 56°19′09″N 3°00′39″W | Category B | 24159 | Upload Photo |
| 1, 3 The Cross (Front Building Only) | | | | 56°19′09″N 3°00′43″W | Category C(S) | 24171 | Upload Photo |
| 7 The Cross | | | | 56°19′11″N 3°00′43″W | Category C(S) | 24173 | Upload Photo |
| Duncan Institute 33,35 Crossgate | | | | 56°19′07″N 3°00′43″W | Category C(S) | 24180 | Upload another image See more images |
| 47-49 Crossgate (Front Building Only Rear Properties At 49 Excluded) | | | | 56°19′06″N 3°00′43″W | Category C(S) | 24183 | Upload Photo |
| 61-63 Crossgate (Front Building Only) | | | | 56°19′05″N 3°00′43″W | Category C(S) | 24186 | Upload Photo |
| Volcano Cafe, Crossgate | | | | 56°19′04″N 3°00′42″W | Category C(S) | 24207 | Upload Photo |
| 80 Crossgate (Excluding Building At Corner Of South Bridge Occupied As Hotel) | | | | 56°19′03″N 3°00′42″W | Category B | 24211 | Upload Photo |
| 3-5 Bonnygate | | | | 56°19′11″N 3°00′44″W | Category C(S) | 24223 | Upload Photo |
| 55-57 Bonnygate (Front Building Only) | | | | 56°19′10″N 3°00′51″W | Category C(S) | 24233 | Upload Photo |
| 6, 8 Bonnygate | | | | 56°19′10″N 3°00′44″W | Category C(S) | 24244 | Upload Photo |
| 66-70 Bonnygate (Front Building Only) | | | | 56°19′09″N 3°00′51″W | Category C(S) | 24258 | Upload Photo |
| 86-88 Bonnygate | | | | 56°19′09″N 3°00′54″W | Category C(S) | 24261 | Upload Photo |
| 90-92 Bonnygate | | | | 56°19′09″N 3°00′54″W | Category C(S) | 24262 | Upload Photo |
| 94 Bonnygate | | | | 56°19′09″N 3°00′55″W | Category C(S) | 24263 | Upload Photo |
| Foxton House And Gatepiers | | | | 56°20′07″N 2°59′08″W | Category B | 2627 | Upload Photo |
| Kinloss House | | | | 56°19′45″N 3°01′44″W | Category B | 2637 | Upload Photo |
| Waterend Road, Footbridge Over River Eden | | | | 56°19′06″N 3°00′35″W | Category C(S) | 48388 | Upload Photo |
| Bell Baxter School Annexe, Lovers' Lane | | | | 56°18′59″N 3°01′02″W | Category C(S) | 24280 | Upload Photo |
| 23 Provost Wynd | | | | 56°19′07″N 3°00′57″W | Category C(S) | 24284 | Upload Photo |
| Castle Hill (Academy) Original Primary School Building | | | | 56°19′12″N 3°00′37″W | Category B | 24287 | Upload Photo |
| Bridge Over Eden Pitscottie Road | | | | 56°19′11″N 3°00′15″W | Category B | 24291 | Upload Photo |
| Goods Shed At Cupar Railway Station | | | | 56°19′08″N 3°00′26″W | Category A | 24293 | Upload Photo |
| 36-40 Kirkgate | | | | 56°19′03″N 3°00′55″W | Category C(S) | 24144 | Upload Photo |
| 5,6 Kirk Wynd | | | | 56°19′05″N 3°00′50″W | Category C(S) | 24148 | Upload Photo |
| 17 Kirk Wynd | | | | 56°19′07″N 3°00′45″W | Category C(S) | 24154 | Upload Photo |
| 2-6 St Catherine Street | | | | 56°19′10″N 3°00′41″W | Category C(S) | 24163 | Upload Photo |
| 51-55 Crossgate And Buildings In Court At 57 | | | | 56°19′05″N 3°00′43″W | Category B | 24184 | Upload Photo |
| 22 Crossgate Edenbank House | | | | 56°19′08″N 3°00′39″W | Category B | 24194 | Upload Photo |
| 24-26 Crossgate | | | | 56°19′08″N 3°00′40″W | Category C(S) | 24195 | Upload Photo |
| 30 Crossgate | | | | 56°19′07″N 3°00′41″W | Category C(S) | 24197 | Upload Photo |
| Youth Employment Offices, 52 Crossgate | | | | 56°19′05″N 3°00′41″W | Category C(S) | 24204 | Upload Photo |
| 56, 60, 62 Crossgate | | | | 56°19′04″N 3°00′42″W | Category C(S) | 24206 | Upload Photo |
| 1 Barony | | | | 56°19′01″N 3°00′43″W | Category B | 24212 | Upload Photo |
| 2-4 Barony | | | | 56°19′01″N 3°00′44″W | Category C(S) | 24213 | Upload Photo |
| 29 Bonnygate | | | | 56°19′10″N 3°00′46″W | Category C(S) | 24227 | Upload Photo |
| St John's Church, Bonnygate | | | | 56°19′12″N 3°00′54″W | Category B | 24237 | Upload another image |
| Bonnygate, Tulach Ard | | | | 56°19′13″N 3°00′55″W | Category C(S) | 24238 | Upload Photo |
| 44-54 Bonnygate (Front Buildings Only) | | | | 56°19′09″N 3°00′49″W | Category C(S) | 24255 | Upload Photo |
| 82 And 84 Bonnygate. (Front Building Only) | | | | 56°19′09″N 3°00′54″W | Category C(S) | 24260 | Upload Photo |
| 96 Bonnygate | | | | 56°19′09″N 3°00′56″W | Category C(S) | 24264 | Upload Photo |
| Cupar Old St Michael Of Tarvit Parish Church Comprising:- Tower And Remains Of Nave; And | | | | 56°19′02″N 3°00′55″W | Category A | 24136 | Upload Photo |
| Balass Farm House And Steading | | | | 56°19′03″N 2°59′04″W | Category B | 2661 | Upload Photo |
| Balass Gatepiers (On Cupar Road) | | | | 56°18′56″N 2°59′14″W | Category C(S) | 2662 | Upload Photo |
| Cupar Muir Elmwood College Farm (Formerly Springfield Farm) | | | | 56°18′16″N 3°02′24″W | Category C(S) | 2624 | Upload Photo |
| Kinloss House Gatepiers | | | | 56°19′41″N 3°01′36″W | Category C(S) | 2638 | Upload Photo |
| Cart Haugh, Cupar War Memorial With Piers And Railings | | | | 56°19′10″N 3°00′32″W | Category B | 46365 | Upload another image See more images |
| East Burnside, Burnside Hotel Gothic Wing (To East) And 1, 1A And 1B Bishopgate, Former United Presbyterian Church Including Boundary Walls | | | | 56°19′14″N 3°00′48″W | Category C(S) | 49882 | Upload Photo |
| 3 East Road, Castlefield House, Including Gatepiers And Boundary Wall | | | | 56°19′16″N 3°00′24″W | Category C(S) | 49966 | Upload Photo |
| Ceres, Cupar Road, Bridgend Steading Including Boundary Walls | | | | 56°17′42″N 2°58′41″W | Category B | 50054 | Upload Photo |
| Ladyinch, West Port | | | | 56°19′09″N 3°01′23″W | Category B | 24275 | Upload Photo |
| Baptist Church, Provost Wynd | | | | 56°19′07″N 3°00′55″W | Category B | 24286 | Upload Photo |
| Cupar Railway Station | | | | 56°19′02″N 3°00′34″W | Category B | 24292 | Upload Photo |
| Rosemount Cottage, Rigg's Place And South Road | | | | 56°18′58″N 3°00′34″W | Category B | 24296 | Upload Photo |
| Roseville Bank Street | | | | 56°19′26″N 3°01′01″W | Category C(S) | 24300 | Upload Photo |
| Eden Park, Eden Place | | | | 56°19′26″N 3°00′16″W | Category B | 24304 | Upload Photo |
| O'Brien, Ashlar Lane | | | | 56°19′02″N 3°00′51″W | Category C(S) | 24139 | Upload Photo |
| 7-9 St Catherine Street | | | | 56°19′10″N 3°00′40″W | Category B | 24157 | Upload Photo |
| 11, 13 St Catherine Street | | | | 56°19′09″N 3°00′39″W | Category B | 24158 | Upload Photo |
| 10, 12 St Catherine Street, Including Royal Bank (Formerly Commercial Bank) And Part Of Bank Of Scotland (Formerly British Linen Bank) Premises | | | | 56°19′11″N 3°00′39″W | Category B | 24166 | Upload Photo |
| 65-67 Crossgate | | | | 56°19′04″N 3°00′44″W | Category C(S) | 24187 | Upload Photo |
| 14 Crossgate And Close To No 16 (Buildings At Rear At No 16 Excluded) | | | | 56°19′09″N 3°00′41″W | Category C(S) | 24191 | Upload Photo |
| 6, 7 Barony | | | | 56°19′00″N 3°00′45″W | Category C(S) | 24215 | Upload Photo |
| Eden Villa, Barony Including Front Wall And Gates | | | | 56°18′59″N 3°00′44″W | Category C(S) | 24217 | Upload Photo |
| Kilrymont 1, 2 Millgate | | | | 56°18′59″N 3°00′47″W | Category B | 24219 | Upload Photo |
| 59 Bonnygate (Front Building Only) | | | | 56°19′10″N 3°00′51″W | Category C(S) | 24234 | Upload Photo |
| Bonnygate Church, Bonnygate | | | | 56°19′11″N 3°00′56″W | Category C(S) | 24240 | Upload Photo |
| 22, 24, 28 Bonnygate | | | | 56°19′09″N 3°00′47″W | Category C(S) | 24249 | Upload Photo |
| Ferrymuir Farm (Formerly Ferrybank) | | | | 56°18′45″N 3°02′00″W | Category B | 2626 | Upload Photo |
| Hill Of Tarvit House, Terraced Garden, Walled Garden | | | | 56°17′43″N 3°00′19″W | Category A | 2628 | Upload another image See more images |
| Hilton House | | | | 56°20′13″N 3°01′26″W | Category B | 2632 | Upload Photo |
| Bell Baxter Academy-Hall | | | | 56°19′09″N 3°01′09″W | Category C(S) | 24274 | Upload Photo |
| 11 Provost Wynd | | | | 56°19′05″N 3°00′55″W | Category C(S) | 24282 | Upload Photo |
| 13 Provost Wynd | | | | 56°19′05″N 3°00′56″W | Category C(S) | 24283 | Upload Photo |
| West Tollhouse, (Edenlea) Pitscottie Road | | | | 56°19′14″N 3°00′24″W | Category B | 24303 | Upload Photo |
| 46,47 Kirkgate | | | | 56°19′04″N 3°00′53″W | Category C(S) | 24146 | Upload Photo |
| 10 Kirk Wynd | | | | 56°19′06″N 3°00′49″W | Category C(S) | 24151 | Upload Photo |
| 8 St Catherine Street | | | | 56°19′10″N 3°00′40″W | Category C(S) | 24164 | Upload Photo |
| The Corn Exchange Tower Only | | | | 56°19′11″N 3°00′41″W | Category B | 24165 | Upload another image |
| 14 St Catherine Street, Bank Of Scotland (Formerly British Linen Bank) | | | | 56°19′11″N 3°00′38″W | Category B | 24167 | Upload Photo |
| Royal Hotel, St Catherine Street | | | | 56°19′11″N 3°00′36″W | Category B | 24170 | Upload Photo |
| 8-12 Crossgate | | | | 56°19′09″N 3°00′41″W | Category C(S) | 24190 | Upload Photo |
| 20 Crossgate | | | | 56°19′08″N 3°00′41″W | Category C(S) | 24193 | Upload Photo |
| 28, 28A Crossgate | | | | 56°19′07″N 3°00′41″W | Category C(S) | 24196 | Upload Photo |
| 36 Crossgate (Former Mansion House Only, Omnibus Sheds Excluded) | | | | 56°19′06″N 3°00′39″W | Category B | 24199 | Upload Photo |
| 66-70 Crossgate | | | | 56°19′04″N 3°00′42″W | Category C(S) | 24208 | Upload Photo |
| 7-13 Bonnygate (Excluding Rear Properties At 11) | | | | 56°19′10″N 3°00′44″W | Category C(S) | 24224 | Upload Photo |
| Stratheden Temperance Hotel, 23, 25 Bonnygate | | | | 56°19′10″N 3°00′46″W | Category C(S) | 24226 | Upload Photo |
| 35 Bonnygate | | | | 56°19′10″N 3°00′47″W | Category C(S) | 24229 | Upload Photo |
| Preston Lodge 95 Bonnygate Gatepiers To Moat Hill Road | | | | 56°19′14″N 3°01′00″W | Category B | 24243 | Upload Photo |
| Freemasons' Hall, 72-74 Bonnygate | | | | 56°19′09″N 3°00′52″W | Category B | 24259 | Upload Photo |
| Dalgairn House | | | | 56°19′35″N 3°00′52″W | Category B | 2625 | Upload Photo |
| Hilton Lodge | | | | 56°20′11″N 3°01′10″W | Category C(S) | 138 | Upload Photo |
| West Port Bar, 130 Bonnygate | | | | 56°19′08″N 3°01′04″W | Category C(S) | 24273 | Upload Photo |
| Primrose Cottage (South Toll House), 1 Ceres Road (James Place) | | | | 56°18′50″N 3°00′33″W | Category B | 24297 | Upload Photo |
| 29 Kirkgate | | | | 56°19′01″N 3°00′57″W | Category C(S) | 24141 | Upload Photo |
| 2,4 Kirk Wynd | | | | 56°19′05″N 3°00′51″W | Category C(S) | 24147 | Upload Photo |
| Angle Cottage, Kirk Wynd | | | | 56°19′06″N 3°00′47″W | Category C(S) | 24153 | Upload Photo |
| Town Hall, And 5 St Catherine St | | | | 56°19′10″N 3°00′40″W | Category B | 24156 | Upload another image |
| 16 St Catherine Street, Clydesdale Bank | | | | 56°19′11″N 3°00′37″W | Category B | 24168 | Upload Photo |
| 19 Crossgate (Front Building Only) | | | | 56°19′08″N 3°00′43″W | Category C(S) | 24178 | Upload Photo |
| 18 Crossgate Royal Bank Of Scotland | | | | 56°19′08″N 3°00′41″W | Category B | 24192 | Upload Photo |
| 38-40 Crossgate | | | | 56°19′06″N 3°00′41″W | Category C(S) | 24200 | Upload Photo |
| Supplies Department 48, 50 Crossgate | | | | 56°19′05″N 3°00′41″W | Category C(S) | 24203 | Upload Photo |
| Weights & Measures Offices 54 Crossgate | | | | 56°19′05″N 3°00′42″W | Category C(S) | 24205 | Upload Photo |
| 76, Crossgate | | | | 56°19′03″N 3°00′42″W | Category C(S) | 24209 | Upload Photo |
| 78 Crossgate | | | | 56°19′03″N 3°00′42″W | Category B | 24210 | Upload Photo |
| 5 Barony | | | | 56°19′00″N 3°00′44″W | Category C(S) | 24214 | Upload Photo |
| 3 Millgate | | | | 56°19′00″N 3°00′47″W | Category C(S) | 24220 | Upload Photo |
| 19-21 Bonnygate (Front Building Only) | | | | 56°19′10″N 3°00′46″W | Category C(S) | 24225 | Upload Photo |
| 31 Bonnygate (Front Building Only) | | | | 56°19′10″N 3°00′47″W | Category B | 24228 | Upload Photo |
| 41 Bonnygate (Front Building Only) | | | | 56°19′10″N 3°00′48″W | Category C(S) | 24231 | Upload Photo |
| 61-67 Bonnygate | | | | 56°19′10″N 3°00′52″W | Category B | 24235 | Upload Photo |
| 16 Bonnygate | | | | 56°19′10″N 3°00′46″W | Category C(S) | 24247 | Upload Photo |
| 18, 20 Bonnygate | | | | 56°19′10″N 3°00′46″W | Category C(S) | 24248 | Upload Photo |
| 56-58 Bonnygate (Front Building Only) | | | | 56°19′09″N 3°00′50″W | Category C(S) | 24256 | Upload Photo |
| Prestonhall House And Gatepiers | | | | 56°19′25″N 2°59′04″W | Category B | 2672 | Upload Photo |
| Kilmaron House Former Stable Block | | | | 56°19′56″N 3°02′05″W | Category B | 2636 | Upload Photo |
| Castlebank Road, 'Castlebank' Including Gatepiers And Boundary Wall And Excluding Modern Bungalow 'Cullaloe' In Grounds | | | | 56°19′16″N 3°00′24″W | Category C(S) | 49965 | Upload Photo |
| 114 Bonnygate | | | | 56°19′09″N 3°01′00″W | Category C(S) | 24270 | Upload Photo |
| 122-126 Bonnygate | | | | 56°19′08″N 3°01′02″W | Category C(S) | 24272 | Upload Photo |
| Blairneuk, Corner West Port And Balgarvie Road | | | | 56°19′08″N 3°01′25″W | Category B | 24276 | Upload Photo |
| Moatview, North Union Street | | | | 56°19′13″N 3°01′07″W | Category C(S) | 24279 | Upload Photo |
| Bishopgate House, Bishopgate | | | | 56°19′18″N 3°00′46″W | Category B | 24301 | Upload Photo |
| 34 Kirkgate | | | | 56°19′02″N 3°00′56″W | Category C(S) | 24142 | Upload Photo |
| 35 Kirkgate (Front Building Only) | | | | 56°19′02″N 3°00′56″W | Category C(S) | 24143 | Upload Photo |
| 44,45 Kirkgate | | | | 56°19′04″N 3°00′53″W | Category C(S) | 24145 | Upload Photo |
| 7,8 Kirk Wynd | | | | 56°19′05″N 3°00′50″W | Category C(S) | 24149 | Upload Photo |
| Winthank House, Kirk Wynd | | | | 56°19′07″N 3°00′47″W | Category B | 24152 | Upload Photo |
| County Buildings, St Catherine Street A) West Section | | | | 56°19′10″N 3°00′36″W | Category B | 24160 | Upload another image |
| St James The Great Episcopal Church, St Catherine Street | | | | 56°19′11″N 3°00′37″W | Category B | 24169 | Upload Photo |
| 39-41 Crossgate (Front Building Only) | | | | 56°19′07″N 3°00′43″W | Category C(S) | 24181 | Upload Photo |
| 43-45 Crossgate (Front Building Only) | | | | 56°19′06″N 3°00′43″W | Category C(S) | 24182 | Upload Photo |
| 32-34 Crossgate | | | | 56°19′07″N 3°00′41″W | Category C(S) | 24198 | Upload Photo |
| 4 Millgate | | | | 56°19′00″N 3°00′47″W | Category C(S) | 24221 | Upload Photo |
| 37-39 Bonnygate (Front Building Only) | | | | 56°19′10″N 3°00′48″W | Category C(S) | 24230 | Upload Photo |
| 73, 75 Bonnygate | | | | 56°19′10″N 3°00′53″W | Category C(S) | 24236 | Upload Photo |
| Bonnygate, Temple Knowe Garden House | | | | 56°19′14″N 3°00′56″W | Category B | 24239 | Upload Photo |
| 42 Bonnygate | | | | 56°19′09″N 3°00′48″W | Category C(S) | 24254 | Upload Photo |
| Tarvit Farm | | | | 56°18′51″N 2°59′42″W | Category A | 2674 | Upload another image See more images |
| Bridgend Village 1, 3 Wemysshall Road | | | | 56°17′45″N 2°58′43″W | Category C(S) | 2618 | Upload Photo |
| Cairney Lodge | | | | 56°20′30″N 3°01′10″W | Category B | 2619 | Upload Photo |
| Cairney Lodge Home Farm | | | | 56°20′30″N 3°01′12″W | Category C(S) | 2620 | Upload Photo |
| Hill Of Tarvit Laundry | | | | 56°17′44″N 3°00′14″W | Category B | 2629 | Upload Photo |
| Kilmaron House Garden Wall, Gatepiers And Former Summerhouse | | | | 56°19′57″N 3°01′57″W | Category B | 2634 | Upload Photo |
| Pittencrieff Farmhouse, Steading And Former Horsemill | | | | 56°19′54″N 3°00′57″W | Category C(S) | 2640 | Upload Photo |
| Easterhill (Former Parsonage), Castlebank Road Including Gatepiers And Boundary Wall (Excluding Modern Bungalow 'suilven' In Grounds) | | | | 56°19′17″N 3°00′25″W | Category C(S) | 49967 | Upload Photo |
| 7 And 9 East Road Including Boundary Wall | | | | 56°19′16″N 3°00′21″W | Category C(S) | 49969 | Upload Photo |
| Albert Hotel, 102, 104 Bonnygate | | | | 56°19′09″N 3°00′57″W | Category C(S) | 24266 | Upload Photo |
| 106 Bonnygate | | | | 56°19′09″N 3°00′58″W | Category C(S) | 24267 | Upload Photo |
| 110, 112 Bonnygate "The Star' | | | | 56°19′09″N 3°00′59″W | Category C(S) | 24269 | Upload Photo |
| Weston, West Port | | | | 56°19′06″N 3°01′11″W | Category B | 24277 | Upload Photo |
| Westfield House, Westfield Road | | | | 56°19′01″N 3°01′15″W | Category B | 24278 | Upload Photo |
| Castle Hill (Academy) Primary School Sw Wing | | | | 56°19′11″N 3°00′39″W | Category B | 24288 | Upload Photo |
| D Maitland Makgill Crichton (1801-51) Statue, South Road | | | | 56°19′00″N 3°00′32″W | Category C(S) | 24295 | Upload Photo |
| Southfield, Ceres Road (James Place) | | | | 56°18′48″N 3°00′34″W | Category B | 24298 | Upload Photo |
| Knox's Cottages, South Road | | | | 56°18′40″N 3°00′40″W | Category B | 24299 | Upload Photo |
| Marybank, East Burnside Including Railings And Bridge Over Lady Burn | | | | 56°19′15″N 3°00′37″W | Category B | 24302 | Upload Photo |
| Former George Hotel, 11-13 Crossgate (Front Building Only) | | | | 56°19′09″N 3°00′43″W | Category C(S) | 24176 | Upload Photo |
| 15-17 Crossgate (Front Building Only) | | | | 56°19′09″N 3°00′43″W | Category C(S) | 24177 | Upload Photo |
| 21-27 Crossgate (Front Building Only) | | | | 56°19′08″N 3°00′43″W | Category C(S) | 24179 | Upload Photo |
| 4 Crossgate | | | | 56°19′09″N 3°00′41″W | Category C(S) | 24188 | Upload Photo |
| 6 Crossgate | | | | 56°19′09″N 3°00′41″W | Category C(S) | 24189 | Upload Photo |
| The Barony | | | | 56°19′00″N 3°00′45″W | Category C(S) | 24216 | Upload Photo |
| Bellfield House, Millgate | | | | 56°18′58″N 3°00′53″W | Category B | 24218 | Upload Photo |
| Arkaig 5 Millgate | | | | 56°19′00″N 3°00′46″W | Category C(S) | 24222 | Upload Photo |
| Ymca 93 Bonnygate (Front Building Only) | | | | 56°19′10″N 3°00′58″W | Category C(S) | 24241 | Upload Photo |
| 38-40 Bonnygate | | | | 56°19′10″N 3°00′48″W | Category C(S) | 24253 | Upload Photo |
| 60-62 Bonnygate | | | | 56°19′09″N 3°00′51″W | Category C(S) | 24257 | Upload Photo |
| Clushford Clushgreen Bridge Over Eden (Near Springfield Village) | | | | 56°17′40″N 3°03′04″W | Category B | 2623 | Upload Photo |
| Hill Of Tarvit Stable Lodge | | | | 56°17′41″N 3°00′12″W | Category C(S) | 2630 | Upload Photo |
| Kilmaron Farmhouse | | | | 56°20′06″N 3°02′51″W | Category C(S) | 2633 | Upload Photo |
| Drumdryan Quarry Powder Magazine | | | | 56°18′28″N 2°59′49″W | Category C(S) | 51660 | Upload Photo |
| 98 Bonnygate, Corner Of Provost's Wynd | | | | 56°19′09″N 3°00′56″W | Category C(S) | 24265 | Upload Photo |
| 108 Bonnygate | | | | 56°19′09″N 3°00′59″W | Category C(S) | 24268 | Upload Photo |
| Bandstand, Hood Park | | | | 56°19′10″N 3°00′28″W | Category B | 24289 | Upload Photo |
| Wm Watt, Seed Merchant Offices (Former Prison) Station Road | | | | 56°19′07″N 3°00′29″W | Category B | 24290 | Upload Photo |
| Station Bridge Over Railway | | | | 56°19′00″N 3°00′34″W | Category B | 24294 | Upload Photo |
| D Brown, Ashlar Lane | | | | 56°19′02″N 3°00′51″W | Category C(S) | 24140 | Upload Photo |
| 9 Kirk Wynd | | | | 56°19′05″N 3°00′50″W | Category C(S) | 24150 | Upload Photo |
| Mercat Cross | | | | 56°19′10″N 3°00′42″W | Category B | 24155 | Upload Photo |
| 5 The Cross And Walker's Tavern Within Close | | | | 56°19′11″N 3°00′42″W | Category B | 24172 | Upload Photo |
| 1-3 Crossgate And 6 Bonnygate | | | | 56°19′10″N 3°00′44″W | Category B | 24174 | Upload Photo |
| 5-9 Crossgate (Front Building Only) | | | | 56°19′09″N 3°00′43″W | Category C(S) | 24175 | Upload Photo |
| 59 Crossgate With Pend To 57 | | | | 56°19′05″N 3°00′44″W | Category C(S) | 24185 | Upload Photo |
| 44 Crossgate | | | | 56°19′06″N 3°00′41″W | Category C(S) | 24201 | Upload Photo |
| Savings Bank 46 Crossgate | | | | 56°19′06″N 3°00′41″W | Category C(S) | 24202 | Upload Photo |
| 43 Bonnygate And 2, 4 Lady Wynd | | | | 56°19′11″N 3°00′48″W | Category C(S) | 24232 | Upload Photo |
| Preston Lodge, 95 Bonnygate | | | | 56°19′10″N 3°01′00″W | Category A | 24242 | Upload Photo |
| 10 Bonnygate | | | | 56°19′10″N 3°00′45″W | Category C(S) | 24245 | Upload Photo |
| 12, 14 Bonnygate | | | | 56°19′09″N 3°00′45″W | Category C(S) | 24246 | Upload Photo |
| 34, 36 Bonnygate | | | | 56°19′09″N 3°00′48″W | Category C(S) | 24252 | Upload Photo |
| Parish Church | | | | 56°19′02″N 3°00′53″W | Category B | 24137 | Upload Photo |
| Cupar Old And St Michael Of Tarvit Parish Church Graveyard | | | | 56°19′01″N 3°00′55″W | Category B | 24138 | Upload Photo |
| Prestonhall Dovecot | | | | 56°19′21″N 2°59′04″W | Category B | 2673 | Upload Photo |
| Trynlaw | | | | 56°18′46″N 3°02′04″W | Category B | 2675 | Upload Photo |
| Cairney Lodge Gate Lodge | | | | 56°20′23″N 3°01′13″W | Category C(S) | 2621 | Upload Photo |
| Hill Of Tarvit Stables | | | | 56°17′42″N 3°00′11″W | Category B | 2631 | Upload Photo |
| Kilmaron House South Lodge And Gatepiers | | | | 56°19′52″N 3°02′24″W | Category B | 2635 | Upload Photo |
| Kinloss Steading | | | | 56°19′44″N 3°01′34″W | Category B | 2639 | Upload Photo |
| 1 East Road, Boundary Wall With Toll Post And Gatepiers Excluding Modern House | | | | 56°19′14″N 3°00′25″W | Category B | 49968 | Upload Photo |
| Elmwood College, Main Block to South, Carslogie Road, Cupar | | | | 56°19′09″N 3°01′51″W | Category B | 52207 | Upload Photo |

== Key ==
The scheme for classifying buildings in Scotland is:

- Category A: "buildings of national or international importance, either architectural or historic; or fine, little-altered examples of some particular period, style or building type."
- Category B: "buildings of regional or more than local importance; or major examples of some particular period, style or building type, which may have been altered."
- Category C: "buildings of local importance; lesser examples of any period, style, or building type, as originally constructed or moderately altered; and simple traditional buildings which group well with other listed buildings."

In March 2016 there were 47,288 listed buildings in Scotland. Of these, 8% were Category A, and 50% were Category B, with the remaining 42% being Category C.

== See also ==
- List of listed buildings in Fife
