= Karen Petrie =

British computer scientist

Karen Elizabeth Jefferson Petrie
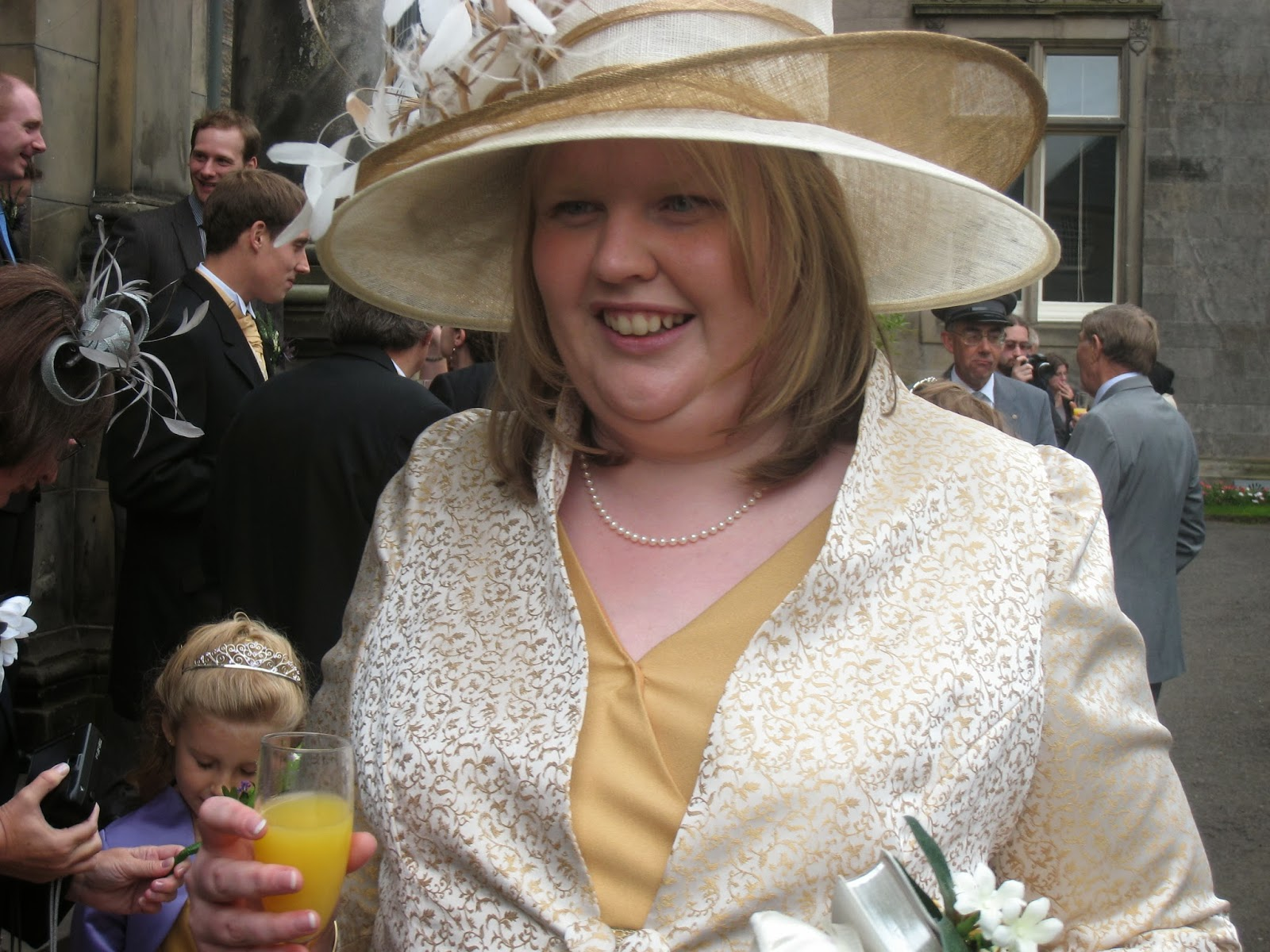
- Petrie in 2008
- Education: University of St Andrews, University of Huddersfield, University of Oxford
- Scientific career
- Fields: Computer science
- Workplaces: University of Dundee
- Thesis: Constraint Programming, Search and Symmetry (2005)
- Doctoral advisor: Barbara Smith

Karen Petrie is a British computer scientist specialising in the area of constraints programming. She was named young IT practitioner of the year by the British Computer Society (BCS) in 2004, for work she carried out whilst on placement at NASA. She is currently a professor in the School of Science and Engineering at the University of Dundee.

She is a women in computing activist, who served as chair of BCSWomen from 2008 to 2011, and organised many events for women in computing during this period.

Petrie is responsible for an argument about sexist behaviour in gender-imbalanced groups called "The Petrie Multiplier", which states that with a gender ratio of 1:r, women will receive r^{2} times as many sexist remarks as men. Proving tight upper and lower bounds remains an open question.
