= Sharon Moore =

Sharon Moore MBE MBCS CITP
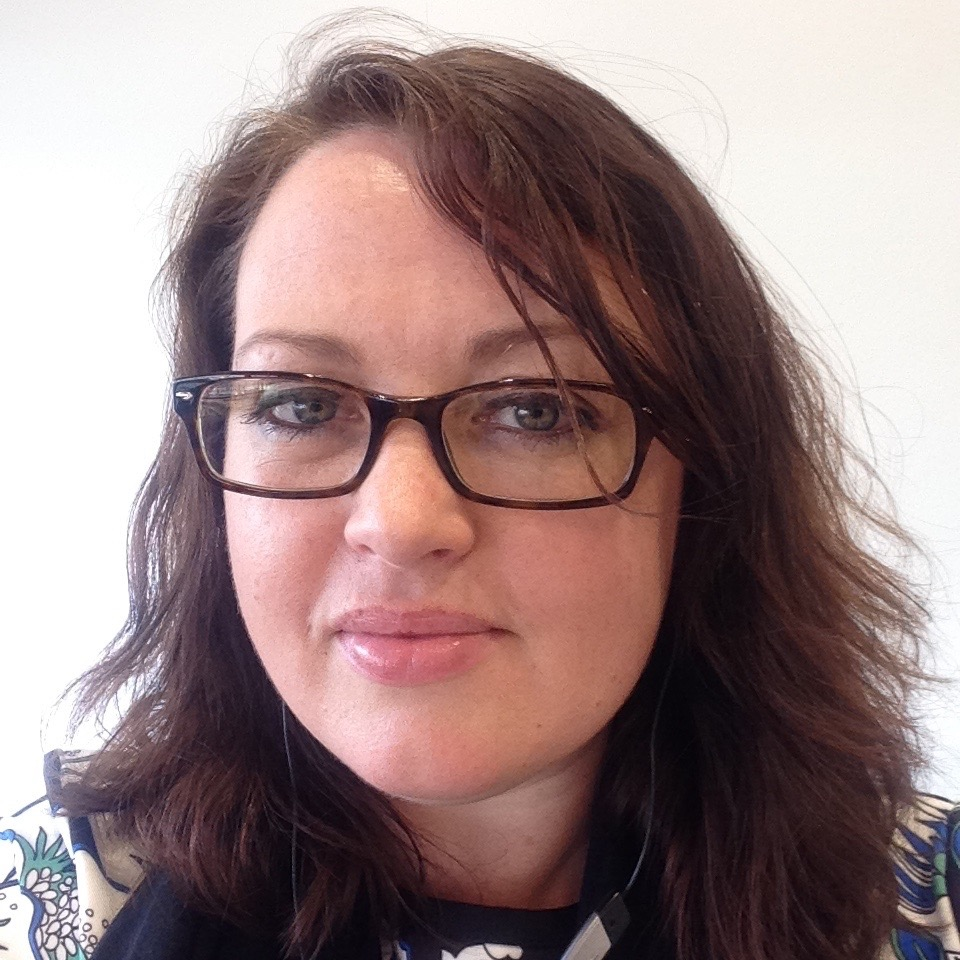
- Education: University of Glasgow
- Employer: IBM

Sharon Anne Moore MBE is the Chief Technology Officer for Public Sector at IBM in the United Kingdom and Ireland. She was appointed a Member of the Order of the British Empire (MBE) in the 2018 Birthday Honours.

== Early life and education ==
Moore studied Software Engineering, at the University of Glasgow and graduated in 2001 with a First Class Honours.

== Career ==
Moore looks to increase the number of senior women in technology careers by retaining young talent and supporting people who return from maternity leave. She has worked in several roles within IBM. She was appointed deputy chair of British Computer Society's Women's group in 2017 having been their committee member for Scotland since 2012. She was made a member of the IBM 100% club in 2012 and 2014. In 2014 she gave a TEDx talk at University of Strathclyde about how social media will change the future. She is working with Skills Development Scotland to tackle Scotland's gender gap in technology.

In 2016, 2017 and 2018 Moore was listed in Computer Weekly's Top 50 most influential women in UK IT. She sits on the Scotland Women in Technology board. She was awarded the 2017 Scotland Women in Technology Inspirational Woman in Leadership award. She featured on Espree Devora's Women in Technology podcast. She was appointed a Member of the Order of the British Empire (MBE) in the 2018 Birthday Honours, "For services to Women in Technology Based Industries". Since 2016 she has been a board member of The Innovation Centre for Sensor and Imaging Systems.
