= Petrie multiplier =

Model of oppressive social interaction

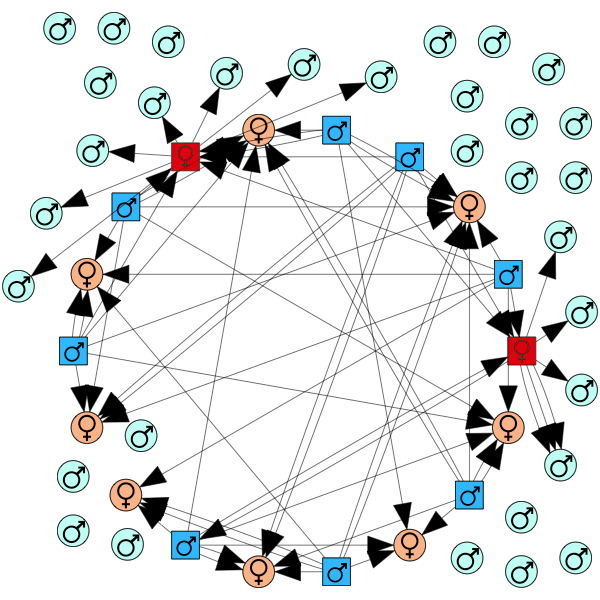
Gent's illustration of the Petrie multiplier, imagining a group that is 80% male and 20% female, and where 20% of people (shown as darker squares) will make sexist comments to those of other gender. After such 70 remarks made at random (shown as arrows from commenter to target), women receive a mean of 5.6 remarks, while men only receive 0.35.

The Petrie multiplier is a thought experiment or mathematical model invented by British computer scientist Karen Petrie, and first described by Ian Gent in 2013. The multiplier shows that if the percentage of men and women in the room who make questionable remarks to the other sex is equal, then the average number of sexist remarks experienced by members of one party scales by the square of the proportion of the offending party to the other.

== Mathematical formulation ==
Gent defined the multiplier in the following terms:

With 20% women the gender ratio is 1:4. So there are 4 times as many men to make sexist remarks, so 4 times as many sexist remarks are made to women as to men. But there are 4 times fewer women to receive sexist remarks, so each individual woman is four times as likely to receive a given remark than an individual man is. These effects multiply, so in this example the mean number of sexist remarks per woman is 16 times the number per man. This holds in general, so with a gender ratio of 1:r, women will receive r² times as many sexist remarks as men.

The Petrie multiplier corresponds to Lanchester's square law in battle and predator–prey dynamics.

== Expanded model ==
The model assumes that men and women are equally sexist. Further, each sexist remark made by a man is assumed to randomly target one of the women and vice versa. A more complex analysis published in the Journal of Physics A modeled heterogeneous levels of sexism by assuming each person to make sexist remarks according to an independent Poisson process, maintaining the assumption that each sexist remark is directed to an individual of the opposite sex. Under these conditions the Petrie multiplier takes the form cr^{1 + ϵ}, 0 ≤ ϵ ≤ 1.

The Petrie multiplier has not been the subject of any empirical study. However, one commentator used a Monte Carlo simulation to eliminate the assumption that people have a fixed number of sexist remarks to make, and found that women suffer from overwhelmingly more sexism in an environment where both genders are equally sexist. Another probabilistic analysis found that the multiplier seemed to hold and suggested that the disparity could be even worse than quadratic.
