= John Finlayson (disciple) =

Scottish disciple of Richard Brothers

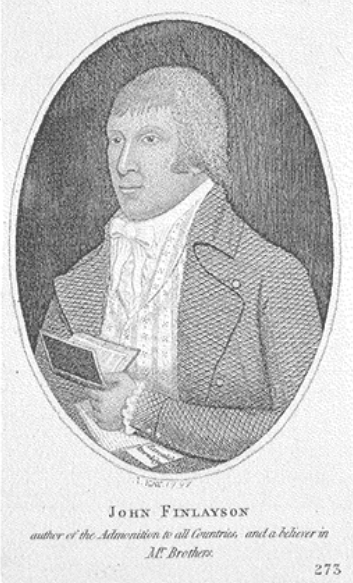
John Finlayson by John Kay

John Finlayson or Finleyson (1770–1854) was a lawyer, author and disciple of Richard Brothers.

== Life ==
Finlayson was born in Scotland in 1770 the son of a tenant farmer at Benyhole farm near Abdie in Fife. He was apprenticed as a "writer" (the Scots term for a lawyer) by Mr James Stark the Procurator for Fife, based in Cupar. Finlayson himself became procurator for Fife in 1793 and continued to practice in Cupar.

He became familiar with the writings of the Richard Brothers who had begun a millennium cult in Britain based on the belief that a second Israel would be created and a new Messiah appear. The Brother's pamphlets predicted a precise day for this: 19 September 1797. On exactly this day, Finlayson closed his office and passed all his legal responsibilities to a Mr John Christie of Cupar.

Finlayson relocated to Edinburgh where he printed a couple of pamphlets before moving to London. In London he was 'in considerable practice as a house agent.' Brothers led him to change the spelling of his name, by telling him his ancestors had some 'fine leys' of land granted them for deeds of valour. Brothers, who died (1824) in Finlayson's house at Marylebone, made it his dying charge to his friend that he should write against a rival genius, Bartholomew Prescot of Liverpool. This Finlayson did, describing Prescot's 'System of the Universe,' very correctly, as a 'misapprehended mistaken elaborate performance, or book.'

Finlayson was much discredited by his book on Isaac Newton in which he claimed Newton to be wrong in most of his theories.

== Publications ==
He printed a variety of pamphlets, reiterating Brothers's views, and developing his own peculiar notions of astronomy, for which he claimed a divine origin. The heavenly bodies were created, he thinks, partly 'to amuse us in observing them.' The earth he decides to be a perfect sphere, 'not shaped like a garden turnip, as the Newtonians make it;' the sun is a created body 'very different from anything we can make here below;' the stars are 'oval-shaped immense masses of frozen water, with their largest ends foremost.'

Finlayson printed:

1. 'An Admonition to the People of all Countries in support of Richard Brothers,' 8vo (dated Edinburgh, 7 September 1797).
2. The same, 'Book Second,' containing 'The Restoration of the Hebrews to their own Land,' 8vo (dated Edinburgh, 27 January 1798).
3. 'An Essay,' &c. 8vo (on Dan. xii. 7, 11,12; dated London, 2 March 1798).
4. 'An Essay on the First Resurrection, and on the Commencement of the Blessed Thousand Years,' 8vo (dated London, 14 April 1798).
5. 'The Universe as it is. Discovery of the Ten Tribes of Israel and their Restoration to their own Land,' 1832, 8 vo.
6. 'God's Creation of the Universe,' 1848, 8vo (contains some of his letters to the authorities respecting his claims on Brothers's estate; Mason and Prescot were angry at this publication, but Finlayson had 'a dream and vision' of Brothers, approving all he had done).
7. 'The Seven Seals of the Revelations.'
8. 'The Last Trumpet,' &c., 1849, 8vo (incorporates No. 7; there are several supplements, the latest dated 21 February 1850).

Also nine large sheets of the ground plan of the New Jerusalem (with its 56 squares, 320 streets, 4 temples, 20 colleges, 47 private palaces, 16 markets, &c.); and twelve sheets of views of its public buildings; all these executed by Finlayson for Brothers (the original copper-plates were in the hands of Beauford, whose price for a set of the prints was 38l.) Finlayson's pamphlets are scarce; he deposited his stock with Mason, after whose death it was destroyed.

== Personal life ==
He married, in 1808, Elizabeth Anne (d. 1848), daughter of Colonel Basil Bruce (d. 1800), and had ten children. His eldest son, Richard Brothers Finlayson, who took the name of Richard Beauford, was a photographer at Galway, where he died on 17 December 1886, aged 75.

== Old age and death ==
Finlayson was reduced in extreme and widowed age to a parish allowance of 3s. 6d. weekly, supplemented by 5s. from Busby, in whose house Brothers had lived from 1806 to 1815. Prescot and John Mason (a brush-maker), though a disciple of Brothers, refused to assist him. He died on 19 September 1854, and was buried in the same grave as Brothers at St John's Wood.
