= Cupar =

Coordinates: 56.32°N 3.01°W

Cupar: Scottish Gaelic: Cùbar
- Town
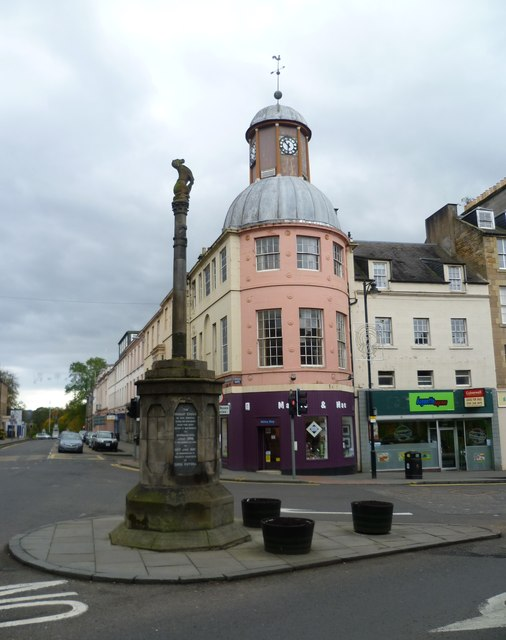
- Cupar Burgh Chambers and Cupar Cross

- Location within Fife
- Population: 8,817 (2022)
- OS grid reference: NO374146
  - Edinburgh: 26 miles (42 km) SSW
  - London: 352 miles (566 km) SSE
- Council area: Fife
- Lieutenancy area: Fife
- Country: Scotland
- Sovereign state: United Kingdom
- Post town: CUPAR
- Postcode district: KY15
- Dialling code: 01334
- Police: Scotland
- Fire: Scottish
- Ambulance: Scottish
- UK Parliament: North East Fife
- Scottish Parliament: North East Fife

Cupar (/ˈkuːpər/; Scottish Gaelic: Cùbar), also known as Cupar of Fife (Scottish Gaelic: Cùbar Fìobha) to distinguish it from Coupar Angus, is a historic market town, former royal burgh and parish in Fife, Scotland. It lies between Dundee and Glenrothes. Cupar had a population of 8,817 in 2022, making it the ninth-most-populous settlement in Fife. It is the historic county town of Fife, although the council now sits at Glenrothes.

== History ==
The town is believed to have grown around the site of Cupar Castle, which was the seat of the sheriff and was owned by the earls of Fife. The area became a centre for judiciary as the county of Fife and as a market town catering for both cattle and sheep.

Towards the latter stages of the 13th century, the burgh became the site of an assembly of the three estates – clergy, nobility and burgesses – organised by Alexander III in 1276 as a predecessor of the Parliament of Scotland.

Although written information of a charter for the modern town was lost, evidence suggested that this existed as one of the many properties owned by the Earls of Fife by 1294.

During the middle of the 14th century, the burgh started to pay customs on taxable incomes, which probably meant that royal burgh status was granted sometime between 1294 and 1328. The oldest document, referring to the royal burgh, was a grant by Robert II in 1381 to give a port at Guardbridge on the River Eden to help boost trade with Flanders. This grant was officially recognised by James II in 1428.

Sir David Lyndsay's Ane Satyre of the Thrie Estaitis was performed in Cupar on 7 June 1552.

== Governance ==
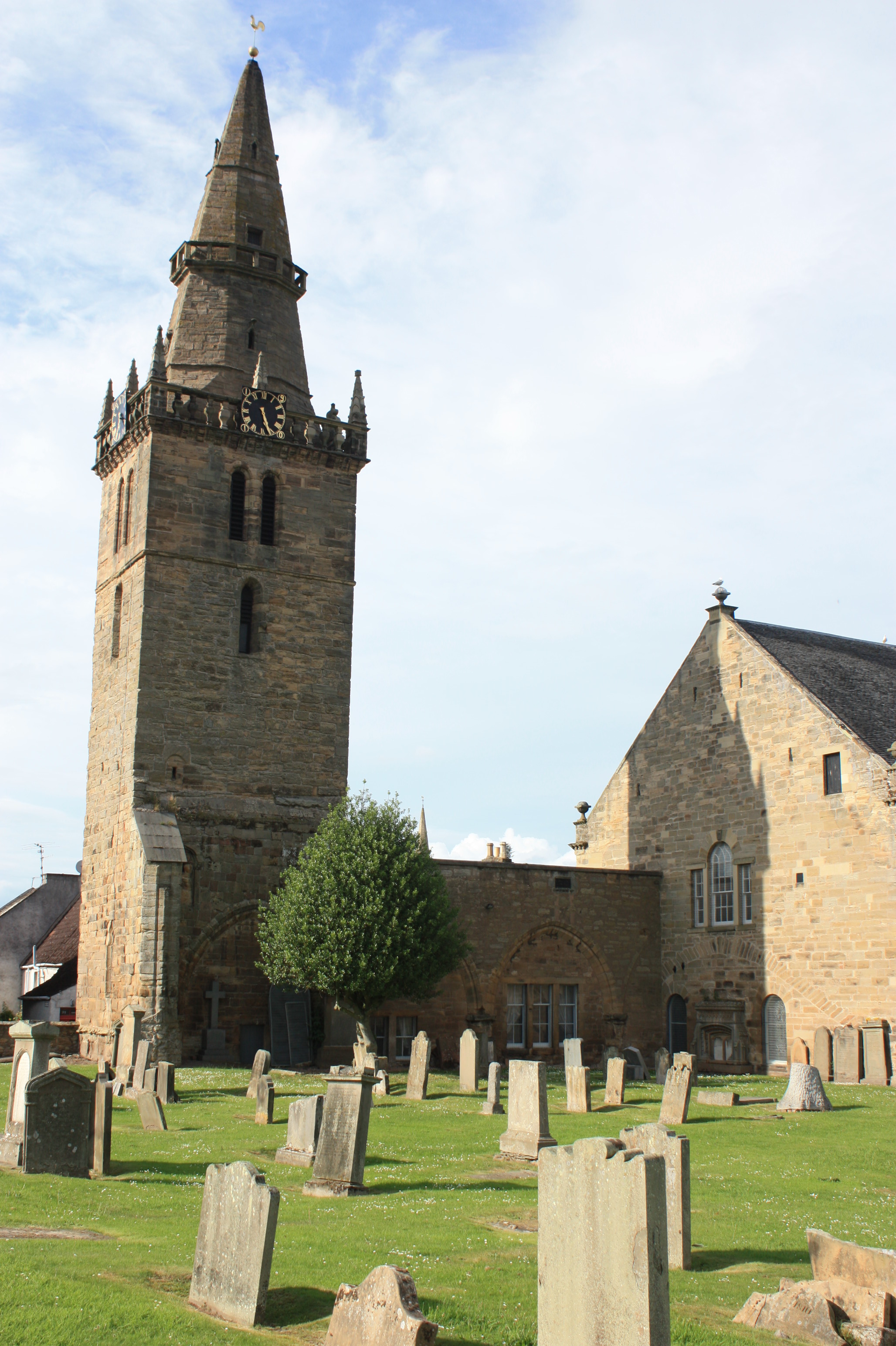
The imposing Old Church, Cupar, Fife

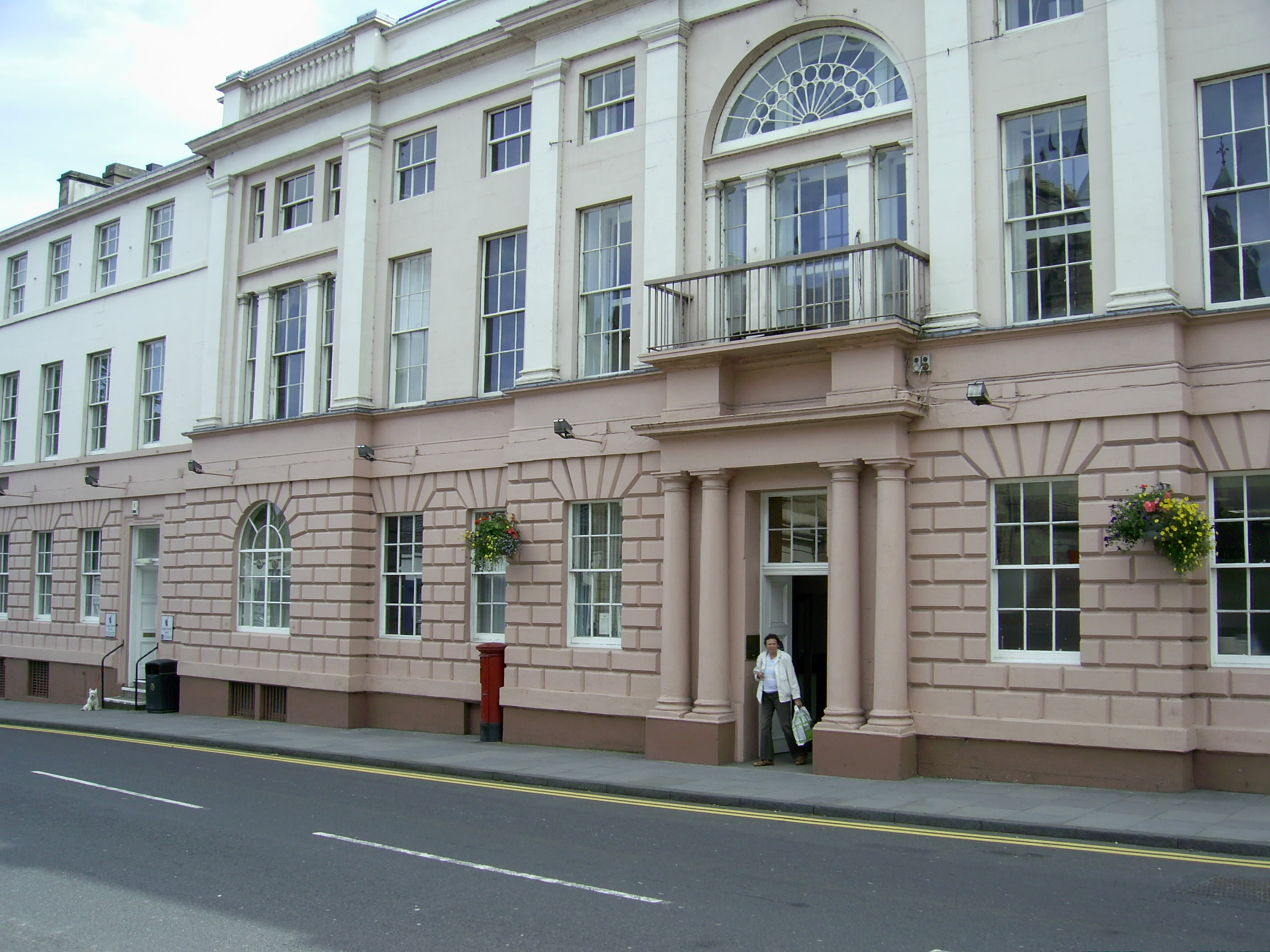
County Buildings, Cupar

Cupar is represented by several tiers of elected government. Cupar Community Council is the lowest. Its statutory role is to communicate local opinion to local and central government. Fife Council, the unitary local authority for Cupar based in Glenrothes, is the executive, deliberative and legislative body responsible for local governance. The Scottish Parliament is responsible for devolved matters such as education, health and justice while reserved matters are dealt with by the Parliament of the United Kingdom. The Cupar area supports three multi-member wards with eleven councillors sitting on the committee of Fife Council. County Buildings on Catherine Street are the main headquarters for the east region of Fife Council, which deals with administrative, planning and agricultural issues.

Cupar is in the UK Parliamentary constituency of North East Fife, electing one Member of Parliament (MP) to the House of Commons by the first past the post system. Wendy Chamberlain of the Liberal Democrats is the MP. Cupar is in the (smaller) North East Fife constituency of the Scottish Parliament, created in 1999 as one of nine within the Mid Scotland and Fife electoral region. Each constituency elects one Member of the Scottish Parliament (MSP) and the region elects seven additional members to produce a form of proportional representation. The constituency MSP is Willie Rennie of the Scottish Liberal Democrats.

Prior to Brexit in 2020 it was part of the pan-Scotland European Parliament constituency which elected seven Members of the European Parliament (MEP)s using the d'Hondt method of party-list proportional representation.

== Demography ==
Cupar compared according to UK Census 2001
	Cupar	Fife	Scotland
Total population	8,506	349,429	5,062,011
Foreign born	1.60%	1.18%	1.10%
Over 75 years old	10.29%	7.46%	7.09%
Unemployed	3.10%	3.97%	4.0%

The 2001 census reported a population of 8,506, which increased slightly to around 8,980 in 2008. It would later went on to have a population of 8,817 at the 2022 Scottish census. The demographic make-up resembles the rest of Scotland. The 30–44 age group formed the largest portion of the population (22%). The median age of males and females was 39 and 43 years respectively, compared to 37 and 39 years for the whole of Scotland.

Reported places of birth were:

- 95.81% in the United Kingdom (including 81.64% from Scotland)
- 0.51% in Ireland
- 1.60% in other European Union countries
- 2.09% in the rest of the world

The economic activity of residents aged 16–74 was 42.20% in full-time employment, 12.32% in part-time employment, 5.89% self-employed, 3.10% unemployed, 2.96% students with jobs, 3.94% students without jobs, 17.68% retired, 4.83% looking after home or family, 4.35% permanently sick or disabled, and 2.72% economically inactive for other reasons. Compared with Scotland's average demography, Cupar has a lower proportion of immigrants, but a higher proportion of over-75s.

== Landmarks ==
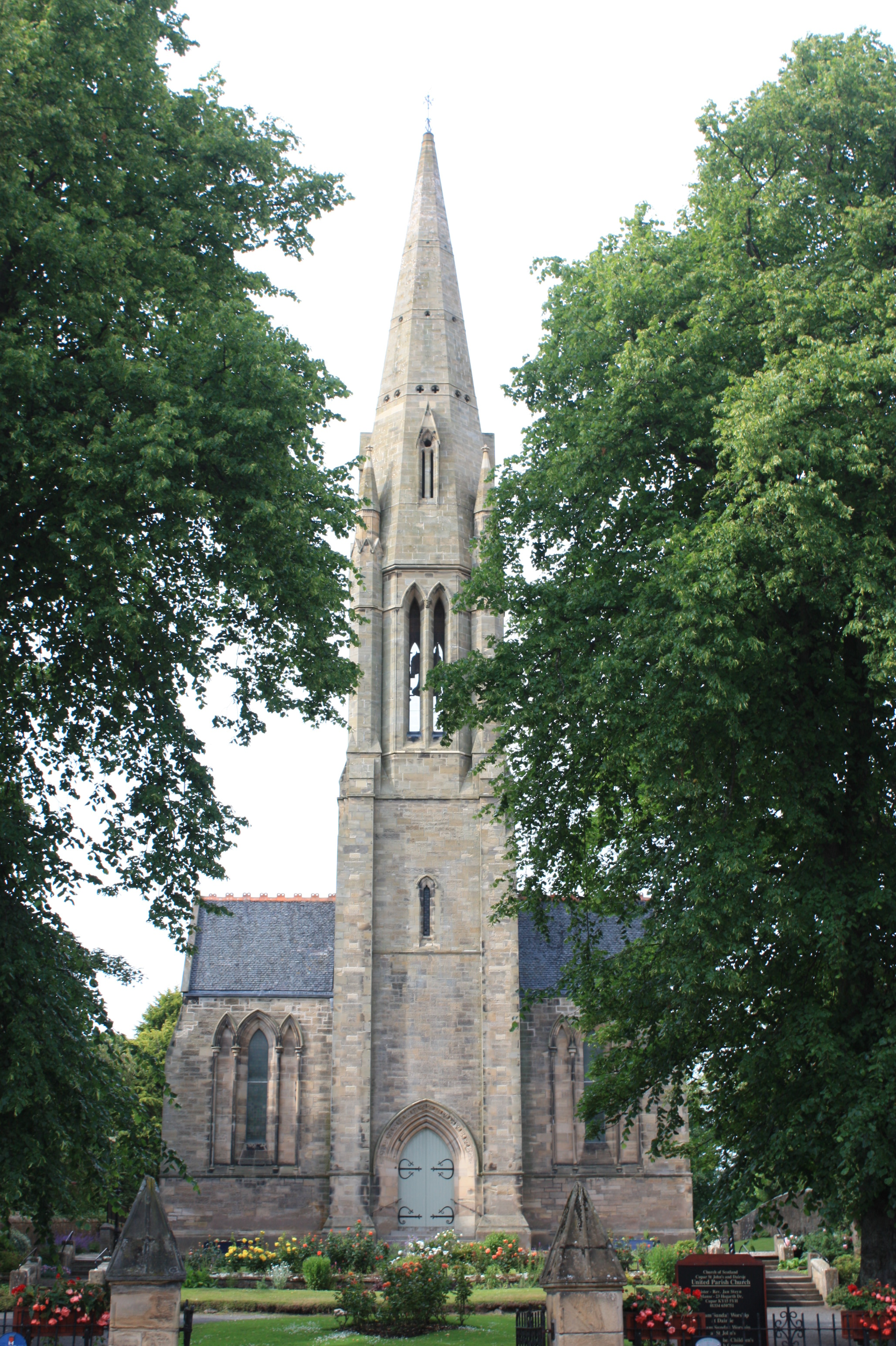
United Parish Church, Cupar

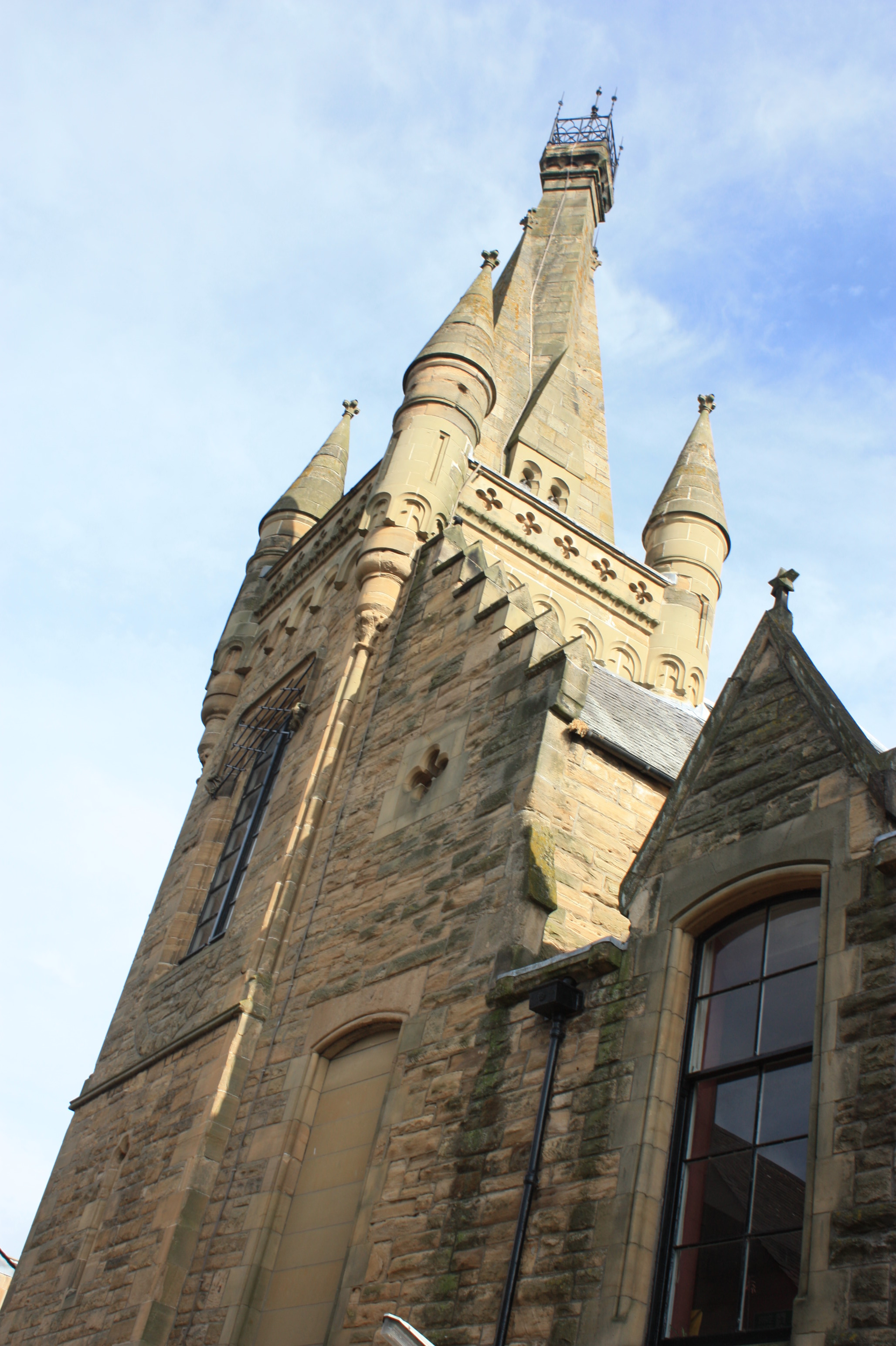
The tower of the Duncan Institute, Cupar

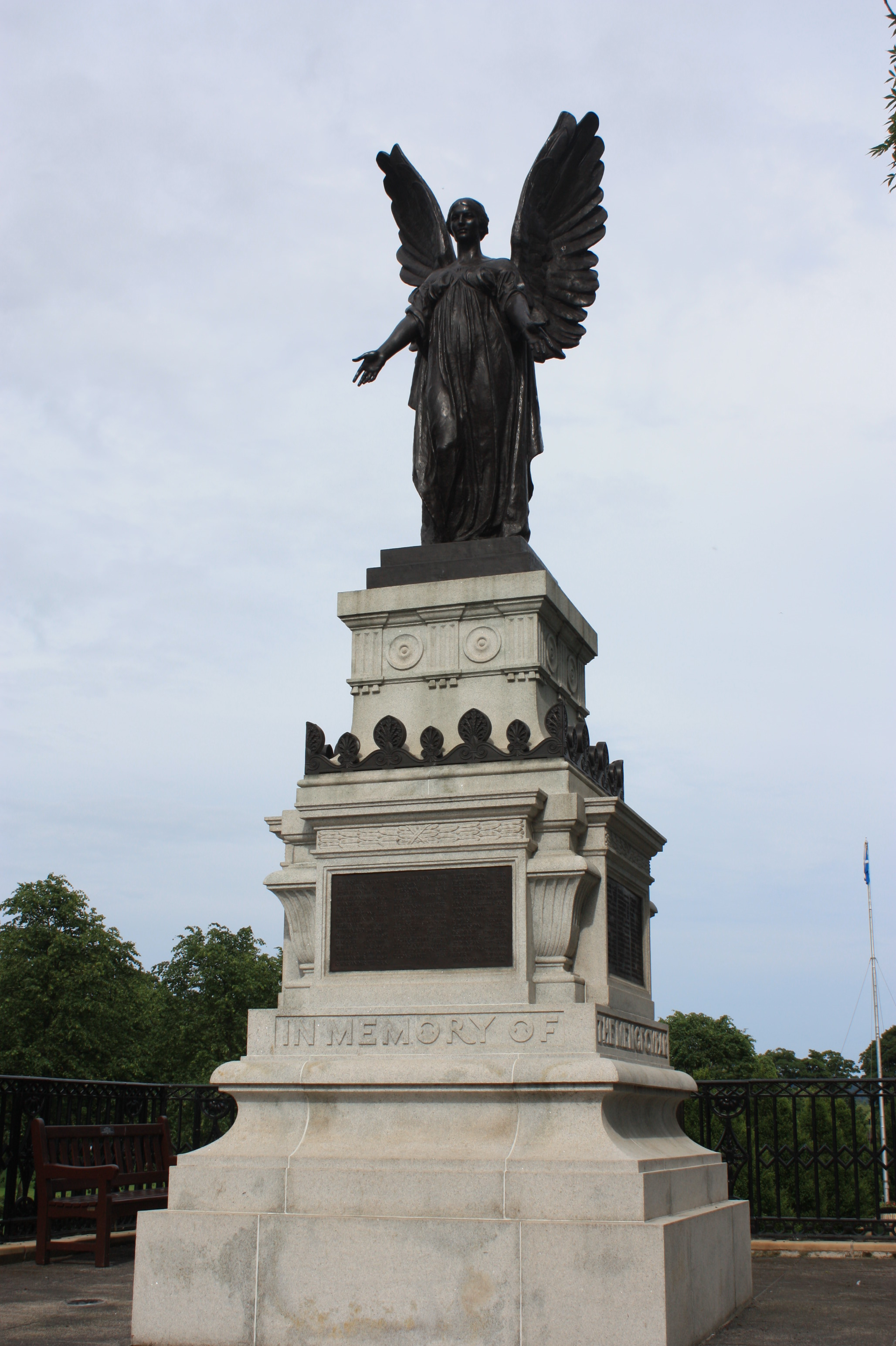
Cupar War Memorial by Henry Snell Gamley

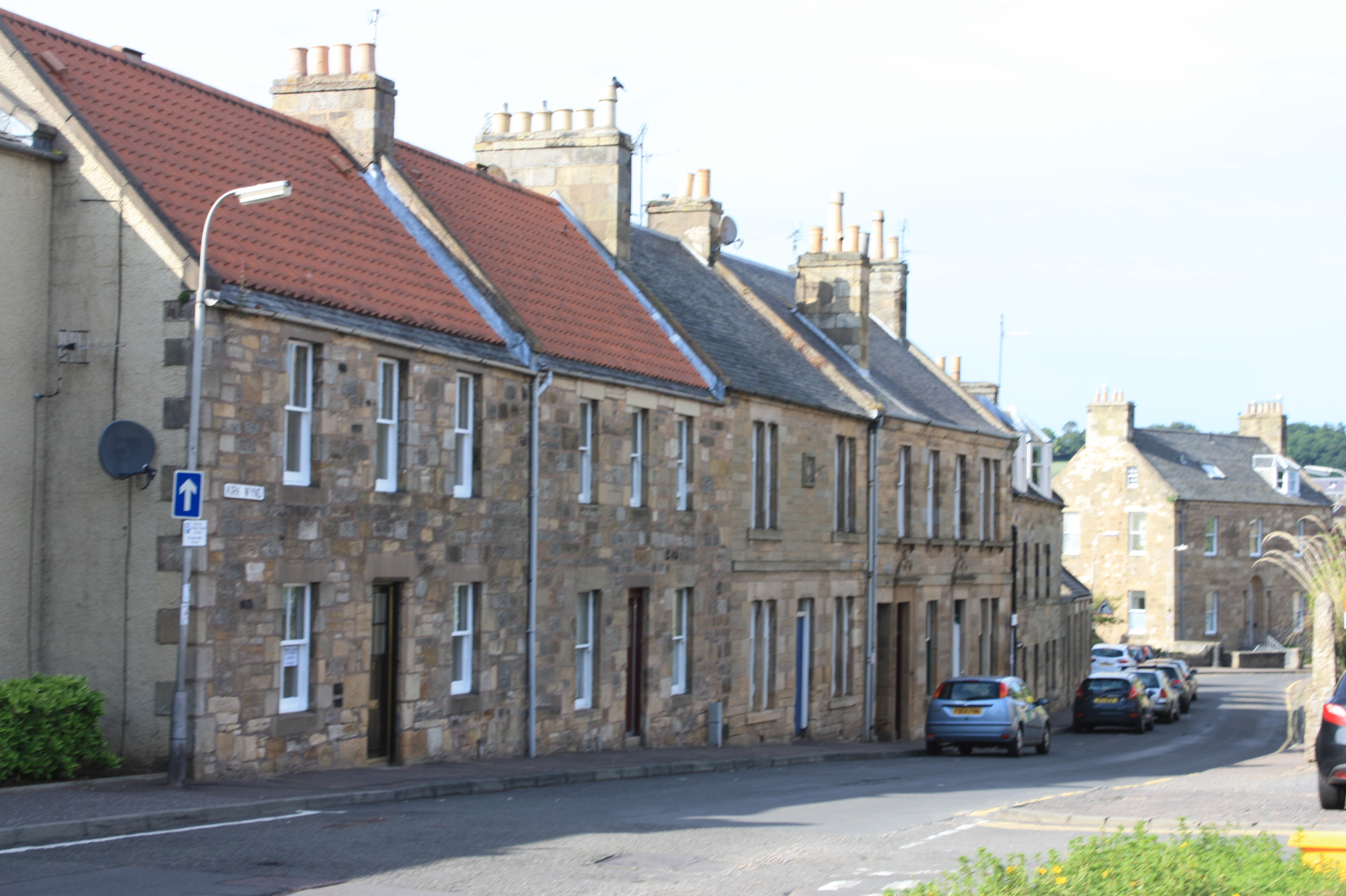
Typical 19th-century houses in Cupar

The Old Gaol was designed by James Gillespie Graham and built 1813–14. After closing as a prison in 1844, it was used by the Fifeshire Militia, later the Fifeshire Artillery Militia. It was purchased by William Watt (seedsman) in 1895 and occupied by that firm until 1988. It operated as Watts of Cupar, a bar and restaurant, until it closed and was sold to developers at the end of 2019.

The historic town centre is the junction of Bonnygate and the Crossgate. This is where the town's mercat cross, is located with the original shaft being supported by a unicorn. It dates from 1683. To the east is St Catherine Street, home to the burgh chambers and county buildings, both designed by Robert Hutchison. The Category B listed Cupar Burgh Chambers, built between 1815 and 1817, contains a three-story bow street corner and a doric entrance. The adjacent county buildings built between 1812 and 1817 are unique in Fife as the only example replicating the style of buildings in the New Town of Edinburgh. The Category B-listed Corn Exchange tower can be seen across the town skyline.

At the east end of St Catherine Street is the Category B-listed Cupar War Memorial in a classical Greek style overlooking the Cart Haugh, one of several designed by John Kinross with assistance from leading contemporary sculptors, for the exception of the Victory statue which was done by Henry Snell Gamley. The memorial was first unveiled by Field Marshal Earl Haig in 1922 and then again for the addition of the World War II memorial in 1950 by the Earl of Elgin. Nearby on Coal Road is a Category B-listed classical style former prison building built between 1813 and 1814.

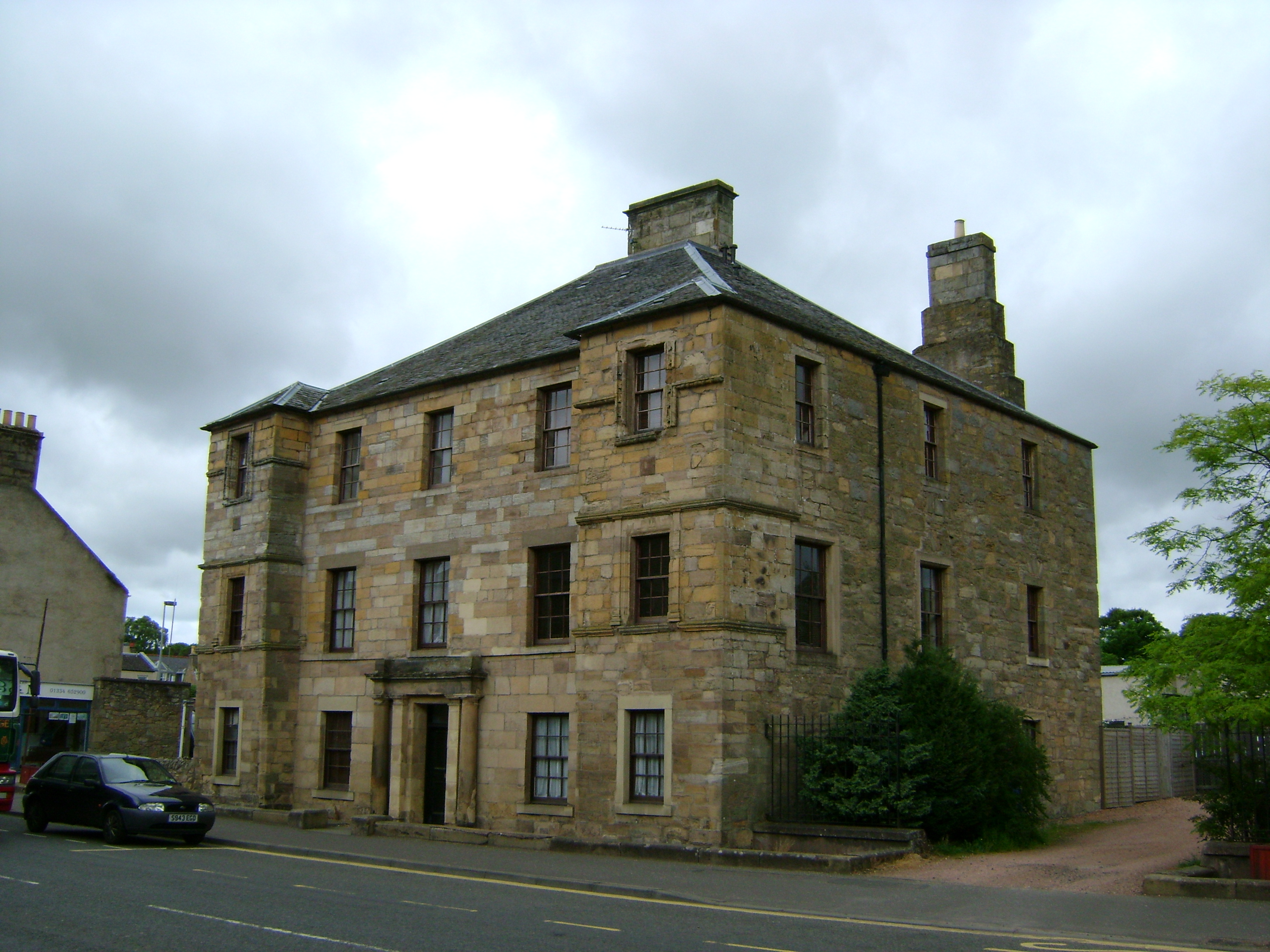
Preston Lodge

On the Bonnygate, the Category A-listed Preston Lodge built by the Laird of Airdrie is the town's second oldest building. The house was built in 1623 and is inscribed on a stone on the west wall. The house was extended in 1702 by James Preston and was remodeled by London goldsmith William Preston, in 1765. Later, the Reverend Sir James Preston occupied the house between 1775 and 1791, when he was the minister of the Cupar Old Parish Church. The original design of the building is believed to have been inspired by Culross Palace in Culross. Situated at the corner of the Crossgate, the Category C listed Duncan's Institute by John Milne, which was built 1870–71 as a mechanics' institute for the "working classes of Cupar" by Mrs Duncan. The building, a mixture of Gothic, Scottish and Flemish styles is recognised in the town for its twisted spire. On the Kirkgate is the Parish Church of Cupar Old and St Michael of Tarvit, designed by the architect Hay Bell. This consists of the Category A-listed parish church tower dating from 1415 and the Category B-listed main church building from 1745. The tower is the only surviving piece of the old Cupar parish church, founded by the priory of St Andrews.

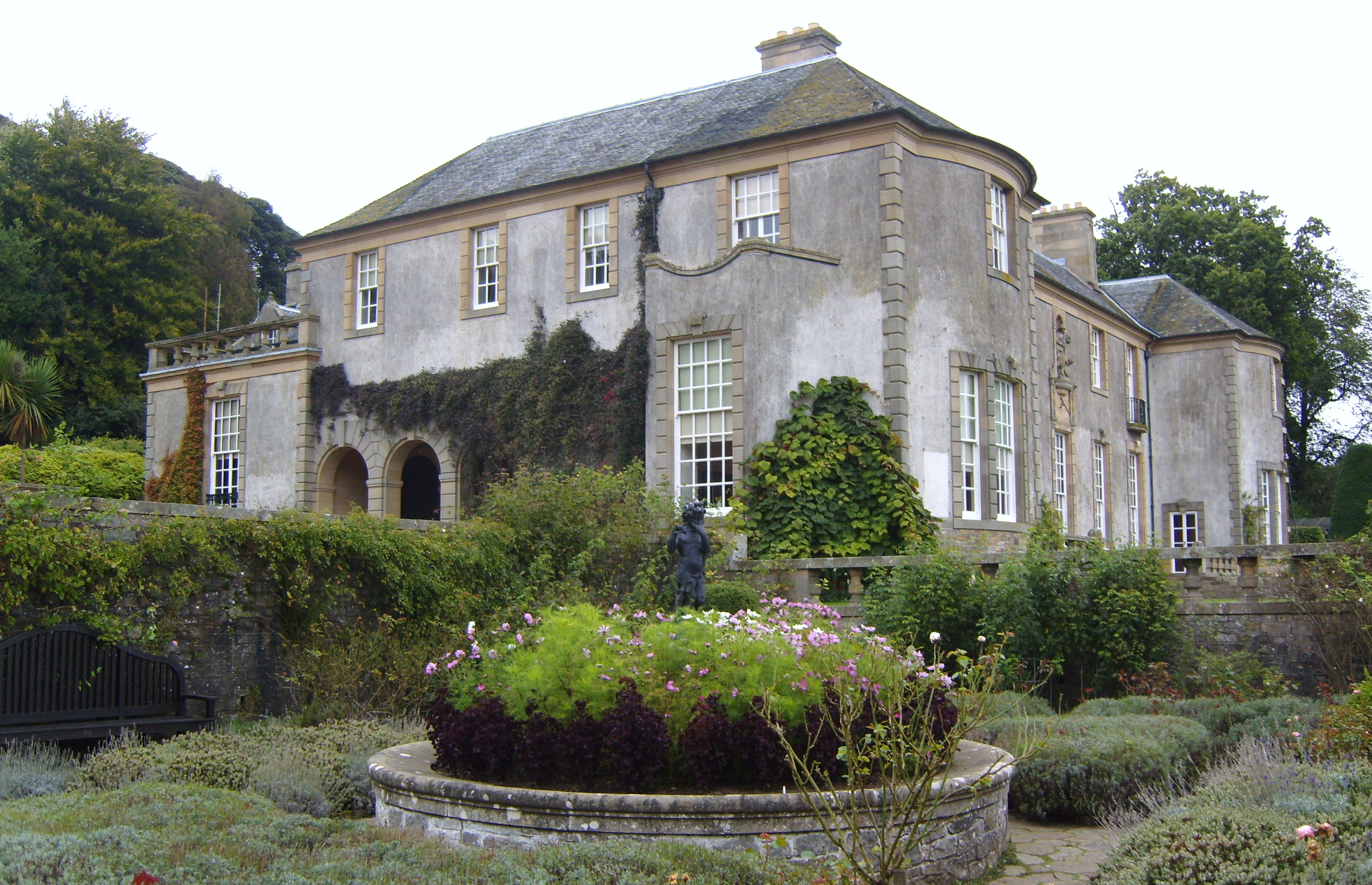
Hill of Tarvit

To the south of the town on the A914 and A916 is the Category A-listed Hill of Tarvit mansion house and nearby scheduled monument Scotstarvit Tower. The Hill of Tarvit was formerly known as Wemyss Hall, designed by Sir Walter Bruce around 1692. When the house was sold in 1904, Robert Lorimer was commissioned to design a bigger house compared to the existing Wemyss Hall to be able to hold the owner's French architecture. This was completed around 1907 and 1908, granting the present name Hill of Tarvit. The house's interior showcased the owner's love of antique furniture ranging from Flemish tapestries; Louis V; Louis XI; English and Scottish have been considered to be Lormier's best work. The service accommodation showcases the range of rooms and equipment used by a family, prior to the First World War. Situated between the Tarvit and Walton Hills, is Scotstarvit Tower, a well-preserved simple L-plan early 17th-century tower house of five stories and an attic. To the north of the town is Hawklaw, which operated as a government radio receiving station between 1942 and 1988.

== Economy ==
Fife Council is the largest employer in the area. Many people are employed in food and drink.

Other large employers are Kettle Produce (fruit and vegetable producer) and Fishers Services Ltd. Other employers include the SRUC Campus at Elmwood College (Fife education); Quaker Oats Ltd (food and drink) and Fisher & Donaldson (food and drink).

The main shopping facilities are located between the Bonnygate and Crossgate, including family-owned businesses and some smaller chain stores. The town also has a business park, trading estate and industrial estate.

In November 2021, the South Road retail park was completed. Shops include Burger King, Costa Coffee, B&M, Card Factory, Indigo Sun, Baynes the Baker and Nimbus Beds.

== Leisure ==
Cupar has an unusual golf course on the side of a hill to the south of town at Hill of Tarvit. The club was founded on 7 November 1855. Cupar Golf Club is rich with history and is probably the oldest nine-hole club in the world.

The Kingarrock course at Hill Tarvit Mansion house uses hickory shafted clubs, in the original style.

Cupar Sports Centre has a 25-metre swimming pool, badminton courts, squash courts and a fitness suite. The pool is the base for Cupar and District Swimming Club.

Cupar is home to Cupar Cricket Club, founded in 1884. It celebrated its 125th anniversary in the 2009 season.

The Castlehill Community Association is home to local groups including Cupar Camera Club, Cupar Art Club, Cupar & District Model Railway Club. They operate from the Old Castlehill Primary School and from 11 St Catherine Street.

Cupar also hosts the biennial Cupar Arts Festival.

== Education ==
Cupar is home to one additional needs school, one secondary school, two primary schools, a nursery school and a playgroup.

Cupar Pre-school Playgroup was opened around 1985. As of March 2022, their website shows that they have closed.

Ferryfield Playgroup was opened in 1967 by Isobel Blair in her home at Ferryfield. In 1976, it was moved to building at Castlehill (not to be confused by Castlehill Primary School).

Westfield Family Nurture Centre was opened in 1981 as part of Castlehill Primary School, but was made independent at some point. It is Cupar's only nursery.

Castlehill Primary School opened to pupils on the present site in 1975 and is located on the town's outskirts. It has an enrollment of 420.

St Columbas R C Primary School was opened in 1965 in Millgate. In 2006 they moved to North Union Street. It serves the Catholic community of Cupar and the surrounding area. It also enrolls non-Catholic pupils.

Kilmaron School caters for pupils that have complex additional support needs. It was built in 1964, and takes in pupils from the ages of 3–18 years.

Bell Baxter High School located on Carslogie Road, serves both the town and surrounding villages. Bell Baxter was originally situated at Westport between 1890 and 2010. In 1962, Bell Baxter started to move to Carslogie Road, with just the senior pupils going at first. In 2010, the Westport site was completely closed. The school roll was recorded in February 2009 and was estimated at 1620 pupils.

SRUC Elmwood (formerly Elmwood College) has three main campuses situated in the town and surrounding area. The college has been praised as a centre for excellence in golf-related studies and specialising in land-based education. Local businesses benefit from the work of the SRUC Rural Business Centre.

== Transport ==
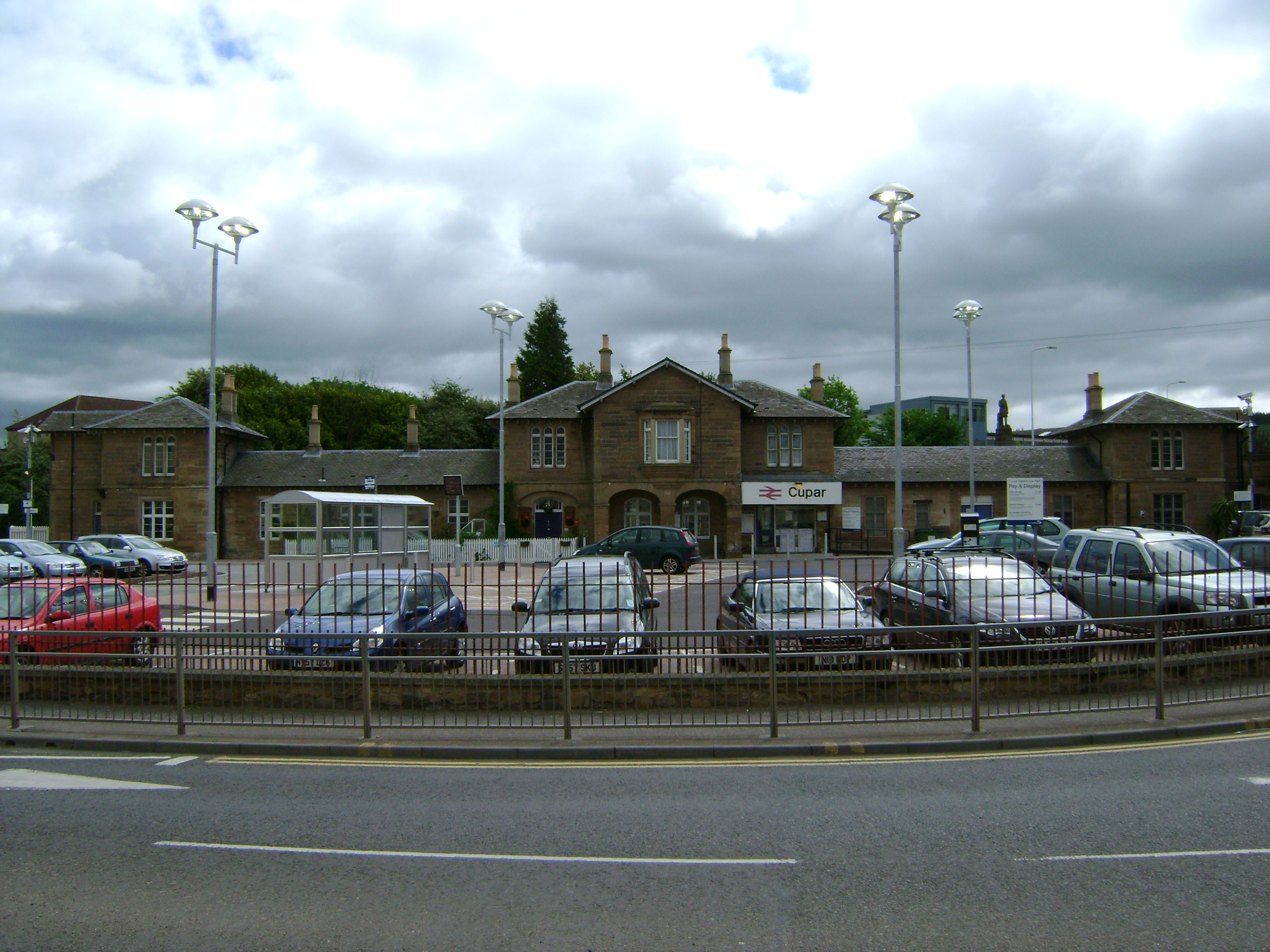
Cupar Railway Station

An express bus service connects the town every hour between Edinburgh and St Andrews and also between Glasgow and St Andrews. Other services run less frequently from Stirling and various local villages through Cupar to St Andrews. An express service also runs via the town from Kirkcaldy to Dundee.

A railway station can be found to the south-east of the town centre. The station is situated on the East Coast Main Line, served by ScotRail and CrossCountry with regular services running between Edinburgh Waverley and Aberdeen. Nearby stations are located to the north-east of the town at Leuchars and to the south of the town in neighbouring Springfield (limited service) and Ladybank.

The nearest major international airport is Edinburgh airport with the nearest ferry sea port at Rosyth being 42 and 35 miles (68 and 56 kilometres), respectively.

== Military ==
Yeomanry House, a drill hall completed in 1890, is home to 'C Squadron' of the Scottish and North Irish Yeomanry. The SNIY provides a Light Cavalry capability and have travelled to Germany and the United States on training and on operations in Afghanistan, Iraq and Cyprus. They previously operated the FV107 Scimitar, FV105 Sultan and FV103 Spartan light armoured vehicles in the a reconnaissance role. They are paired with the Royal Scots Dragoon Guards based at Leuchars Station (formerly RAF Leuchars).

The Army Cadet Force and Air Training Corps 571 (Cupar) Squadron are also active in the town.

== Notable people ==
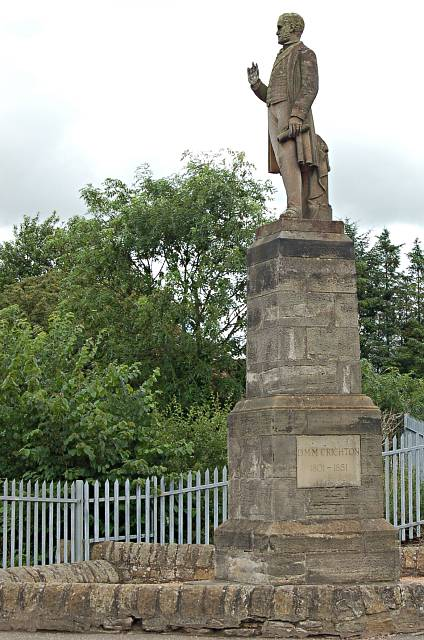
David Maitland Makgill Crichton, who campaigned to have a bridge rather than a level crossing

- Colonel Robert Hope Moncrieff Aitken (1826–1887), recipient of the Victoria Cross during the Indian Mutiny, born in Cupar
- Caroline Baird (born 1974), Paralympic athlete, from Cupar
- Adam Cairns (1802–1881), Presbyterian minister, emigrated to Melbourne.
- Rory Douglas-Speed (born 1992), actor, born in Cupar
- John Finlayson (1770–1854), millennium cultist
- Lady Henrietta Gilmour (1852–1926), pioneer photographer, lived at Denbrae House north of Cupar and is buried in Cupar Cemetery
- Jane Stocks Greig (1872–1939), physician and public health specialist, born in Cupar
- Henrietta Keddie (1827–1914), wrote as Sarah Tytler, born in Cupar
- John Laird (1811–1896), Presbyterian minister and Free Church moderator.
- Alexander Nimmo (1783–1832), civil engineer and geologist active in early 19th-century Ireland, born in Cupar
- Rab Noakes (1947–2022), singer-songwriter, from Cupar
- Robert Robertson (1869–1949), chemist and formerly the government chemist, born in Cupar
- Sir Thomas Russell, 1st Baronet (1841–1920), politician, temperance campaigner and agrarian agitator
- William Wallace (1844–1897), philosopher
