= Julilly House Kohler =

American author

- Born: Julilly House; October 18, 1908; Cincinnati, Ohio
- Died: December 24, 1976 (aged 68); Sheboygan, Wisconsin
- Occupation: Author

Julilly House Kohler (October 18, 1908 – December 24, 1976) was a member of the Kohler family of Wisconsin and was writer of books for children. She lived in Kohler, Wisconsin. She was active in social work and community projects, and was well known for advocacy for the preservation of burial mounds constructed by the North American Mound Builders at Sheboygan Indian Mound Park.

== Biography ==
Julilly House was born in Cincinnati, Ohio, on October 18, 1908, the only child of William Henry House and Mary Lilly Waller. The family moved to Morganfield, Kentucky, and then to Evansville, Indiana, where Kohler spent most of her early years, graduating from Central High School in 1926. She then attended Wellesley College, graduating in 1930 with a degree in French literature. Kohler was a member of Theta Sigma Phi, a national fraternity for women in journalism.

While she was working in Chicago at Marshall Field & Co, she met John Michael Kohler III, who was at the time assigned as manager of the Kohler Company's Chicago branch office. John Kohler was the son of Walter J. Kohler Sr. They were married on January 7, 1933. The couple resided in the Chicago area until Mr. Kohler was transferred to the Kohler Company home offices in 1937. In 1948 they purchased Riverbend, the Tudor estate in Kohler originally built by Mr. Kohler's father, Gov, Walter J. Kohler Sr. The estate is currently a private resort operated as part of the Kohler Experience.

The couple had four children: John Michael Kohler IV (1935–2022), William Collin Kohler (1937–), Julilly Waller Kohler (1942–), and Marie House Kohler (1951–).

== Writing career ==
Kohler began her writing career as a hobby, beginning with children's stories that were published in Story Parade, Child Life, and Jack and Jill and gained notability for publication of the children's books, Farmer Collins and Football Trees in the 1940s. She also made contributions to adult magazines like McCall's, Vogue, and Library Journal.

== Social and philanthropic work ==
In 1954 she was elected an alumnae trustee of Wellesley College at Wellesley, Massachusetts, and served on the board for a six-year term. Her Wellesley association involved invitations to be a visiting observer of classes and administration.

In 1956 she co-founded the Town and Country Garden Club based in Sheboygan, Wisconsin.

One of her early community activities was organizing and producing a radio quiz show program, Readers Roundup, under the American Association of University Women, which was designed to encourage reading by young people.

She was active with the Sheboygan Community Players, both as a performer and board member.

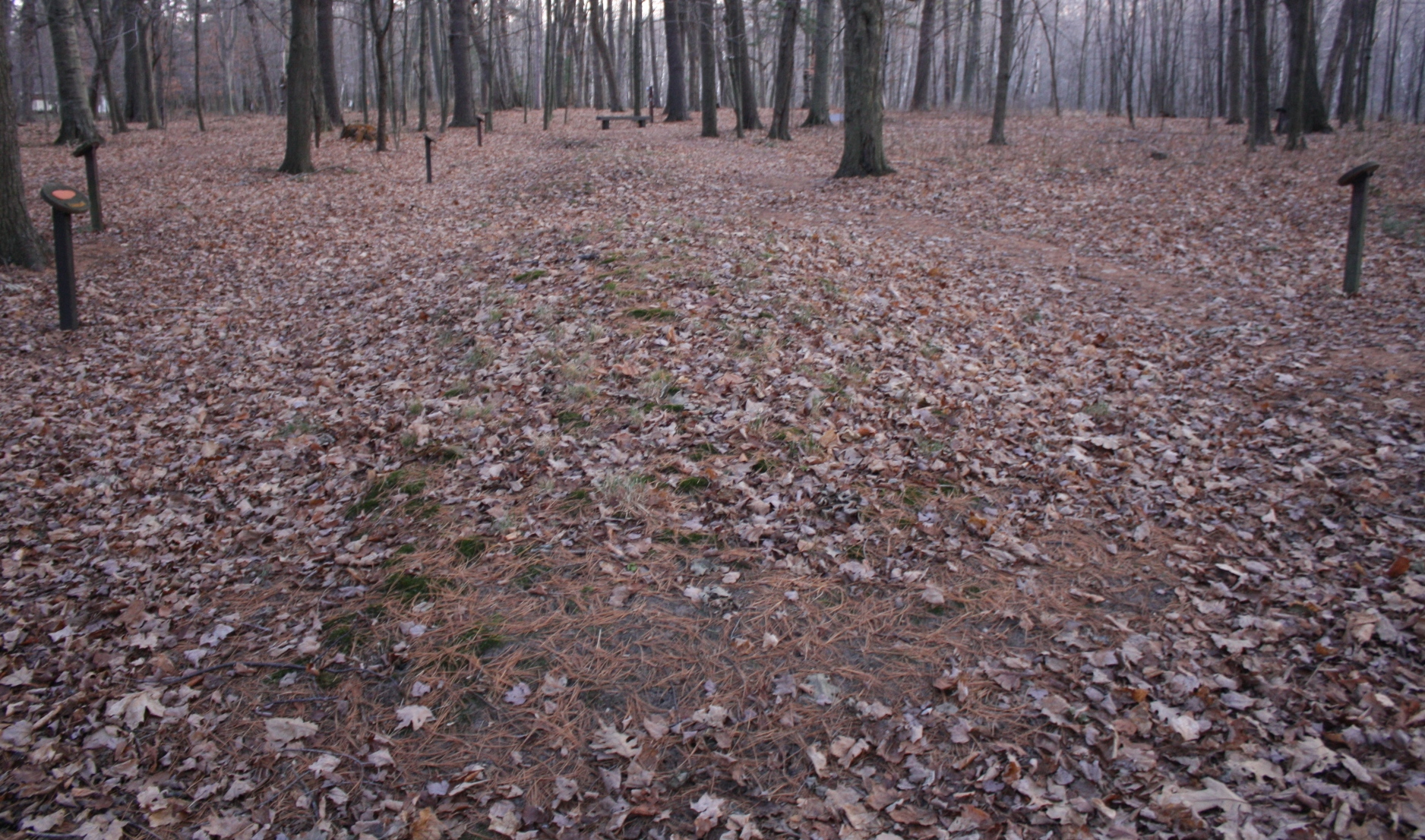
Kletzien Mound Group near Sheboygan, Wisconsin

In 1967, she organized and led a campaign to preserve the historic Indian mounds, south of Sheboygan, which resulted in the site being designated as Sheboygan Indian Mound Park. In 1968 Kohler was the registered agent for the incorporation of the Sheboygan Indian Mound Park Association, Inc. In 1981, the site was added to the National Register of Historic Places.

After her husband died in 1968, Mrs. Kohler was asked to take his place as an active trustee of Ripon College, serving in that capacity for five years from 1968 until 1975.

== Bibliography ==
=== Children's books ===
1. Farmer Collins, (1947), Kohler and Englebrecht
2. Football Trees, (1947), Kohler
3. Daniel in the Cub Scout Den (1951), Kohler
4. Harmony Ahead (1952), Kohler
5. The Boy Who Stole The Elephant (1952), Kohler
6. Crazy As You Look! (1954), Kohler
7. Friend to All (1954), Kohler
8. The Sun Shines Bright (1956), Kohler
9. Razzberry Jamboree (1957), Kohler
10. Collins and his Rabbit (1969), Kohler

=== Non-fiction ===
1. You and the Constitution of the United States (1963), Witty, Kohler, and Finney
2. Plants and Flowers to Decorate Your Home (1977) (posthumous), Kohler, ISBN 9780307492548
