= Kohler strikes =

The Kohler strikes at the Kohler Company, just west of Sheboygan, Wisconsin in 1934 and 1954, are landmarks in the history of both business and labor in the United States. Labor leaders have often cited the warfare at the giant plumbing supply company in their contention that workers need unions. Industrial leaders have pointed to the strikes as examples of union belligerence and indifference toward the true welfare of their employees.

== Strike of 1934 ==
The Kohler Company was founded in Sheboygan, Wisconsin in 1873, when John Michael Kohler II (1844–1900) took over his father-in-law's steel and iron factory. During the late 19th century it prospered as the producer of plumbing products and enamelware. In 1912, land around a new factory just west of Sheboygan became the Village of Kohler, Wisconsin. From 1905 until his death, John Michael's son Walter J. Kohler Sr. (1875–1940) led the highly successful business. In the early 1920s, he built a family mansion, Riverbend, and was welcomed in high society in Chicago and elsewhere. In 1928, he became Governor of Wisconsin for a single term.

With the passage of the National Industrial Recovery Act by Congress in June 1933 that gave the employees the right to have a union, Kohler followed the lead of many industrialists and created a workers association that he could control to forestall the creation of an independent union. Although this association handled minor shop floor grievances they never negotiated contracts with the company instead they accepted the company’s offer.

In August 1933 the workers at Kohler applied for and received a charter from the American Federation of Labor for a union. It was named Federal Labor Union No. 18545.

On October 4, 1933, November 21, 1933, and November 28, 1933 meetings were held between Local 18545 members and the Kohler executives, but nothing was accomplished. On June 22, 1934 the union presented Kohler management with a 14 point proposal with the first item being recognition of their union. Four days later the company announced the shutdown of the entire plant. It had been the Kohler custom to shut down the plant for a couple of days around the 4th of July holiday and sponsor a picnic for all employees, but this shutdown came without warning and was termed indefinite. Workers were told they would be called back as necessary. Once again when presented with the union asserting itself, the Kohler Company, now with Walter Kohler at its head, chose to demonstrate to the employees who owned the company and that he would not be bargained with.

Violence quickly erupted and the entire Village was closed to traffic. Special deputies hired by the company clashed with pickets, and huge crowds began to assemble. On July 27, purportedly in response to vandalism against company property, the special deputies attacked with guns and tear gas. Two named Lee Wakefield and Harry Englemann were killed, and 47 "men, women and boys were wounded, gassed, and injured". On July 29, in response to appeals by Walter and the local sheriff, 250 members of the National Guard arrived on the scene. Walter, who had been trapped in the main office building for 12 days, blamed the violence on outsiders and people with "communistic affiliations."

In September, the National Labor Relations Board ruled against the Kohler Company and demanded secret, supervised elections at the plant to determine who would represent the workers, which the company union won. The Kohler victory was short-lived, however, for in 1935 the US Supreme Court declared the National Industrial Recovery Act unconstitutional. Congress soon, however, passed the Wagner Act, giving organized labor the right to organize and bargain collectively without employer interference. A majority of workers could now determine who would represent them; this "union shop" was the chief goal of the AFL. Still, the company union and the principle of "open shop" remained in effect at the Kohler Company until 1952, when the United Auto Workers (UAW) won an election.

== Strike of 1954 ==
During the Second World War, Herbert V. Kohler Sr. (1891–1968) gained control of the Kohler Company. He had played a key role in the strike of 1934 and was a staunch opponent of organized labor.

The United Auto Workers Local 833 was determined to organize Kohler employees, and it won a certified election in 1952. Herbert V. Kohler refused to grant union demands during contract negotiations, and a strike began on April 5, 1954. Some 2,800 of the Company's 3,300 employees joined the picket lines. The plant essentially ceased operations for two months. Herbert then resumed production with non-union labor. Six years of sporadic violence ensued between strikers and strike breakers. In time, the company would charge opponents with more than a thousand acts of vandalism. At one point, more than 300 people were arrested. Calls for a national boycott of Kohler products were vociferous and sometimes effective, and UAW provided $12 million to strikers over the years. Herbert resisted all efforts to compromise, even sharply rejecting a public appeal from his nephew, Governor Walter J. Kohler Jr.

In 1960, the National Labor Relations Board decided against the Kohler Company, ruling that it had refused to bargain in good faith after the strike broke out. Herbert was ordered to reinstate 1,700 workers. It took lawsuits by both sides and two more years for management and labor to work out a contract. The bitter issue of compensation for strikers remained unresolved. In December 1965, the Kohler Company agreed to pay $3 million in back wages to some 1,400 former employees and hand over $1.5 million in pension-fund contributions. The union agreed to make no further charges stemming from the strike. The longest major strike in American history had ended.

After Herbert's death, his son Herbert V. Kohler Jr. (1939-2022) headed the family-owned company and took a more positive approach to labor relations. In 2002, for example, a five-year labor contract was signed. However, the long and often bloody struggle scarred thousands of lives throughout the Sheboygan-Kohler area and elsewhere for more than three decades.

== Strike of 1983 ==
The third strike, which occurred in 1983 and lasted 16 days, saw car windows smashed by demonstrators and two union members injured by a motorist who drove his vehicle through a picket line.

== Strike of 2015 ==
On November 15, 2015, 94% of the UAW Union Local 833 membership rejected the contract proposal and voted to strike. The strike was declared after paper-ballot voting by an estimated 1,800 union members attending a meeting at Sheboygan South High School. At issue was a two-tiered employee system that was established in 2010.

== See also ==
- 2015 Kohler Strike
