= John Michael Kohler =

19th century American politician

John M. Kohler
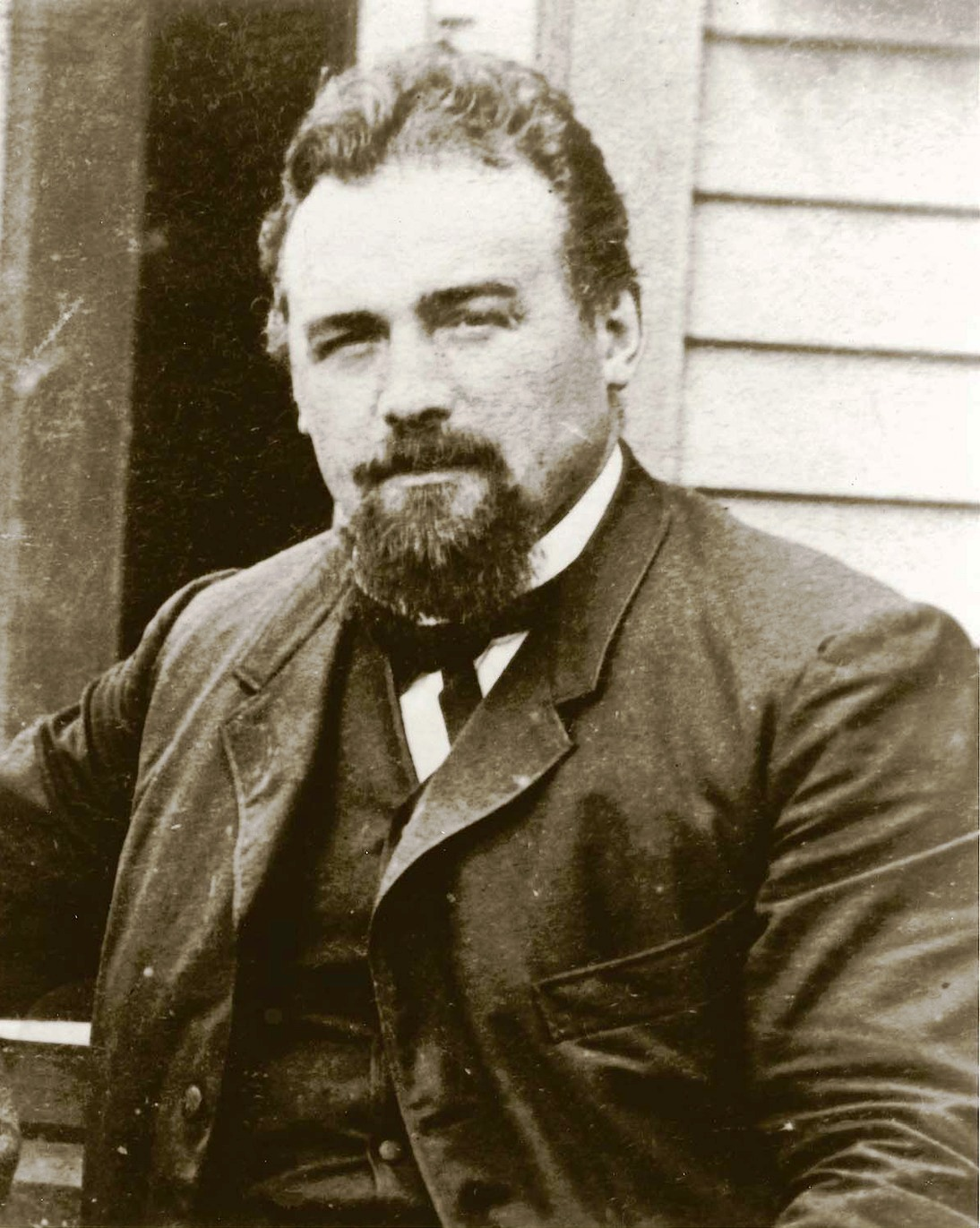
- John Michael Kohler in 1873

27th Mayor of Sheboygan, Wisconsin
- In office April 1892 – April 1893
- Preceded by: Frederick C. Runge (acting)
- Succeeded by: Francis Geele

Personal details
- Born: Johann Michael Kohler; November 3, 1844 Schnepfau, Austrian Empire
- Died: November 5, 1900 (aged 56) Sheboygan, Wisconsin, U.S.
- Spouses: Elizabeth "Lilli" Vollrath (m. 1871; died 1883); Wilhelmina "Minnie" Vollrath (m. 1887)
- Children: 7, including Walter
- Known for: Founder and president of Kohler Company

John Michael Kohler II (November 3, 1844 – November 5, 1900) was an Austrian American immigrant, industrialist, and politician. He most notably founded and led the Kohler Company and served as the 27th mayor of Sheboygan, Wisconsin. He was the patriarch of the Kohler family of Wisconsin.

The John Michael Kohler Arts Center, which occupies a square block in downtown Sheboygan (containing Kohler's restored Gilded Age home along with modern buildings), is named for Kohler, as is John Michael Kohler State Park, established on land donated in 1966 by the Kohler family. The main highway into Sheboygan, Kohler Memorial Drive (which is routed as Wisconsin Highway 23), is also named for Kohler.

== Early life ==
Kohler was born November 3, 1844, in Schnepfau, Austria, then part of the Austrian Empire. He was the fourth child of Johann Michael Kohler (1805–1874), a dairy farmer, and Maria Anna Kohler (née Moosbrugger; 1816–1853). After his wife's death, the elder Kohler remarried, and he and his large family emigrated to the United States. With help from a relative, the Kohlers built up a promising dairy business.

After receiving a limited formal education, Kohler found work in St. Paul, Minnesota. In 1865 he moved to Chicago, Illinois, and became a traveling salesman. In Sheboygan, Wisconsin, 56 miles north of Milwaukee on Lake Michigan, he met Lillie Vollrath (1848–1883), the daughter of local steel and iron industrialist Jacob Vollrath (1824–1898). The couple was married in 1871.

== Business career ==
Shortly after his marriage, Kohler worked at the steel and iron factory his father-in-law partly owned. He took over the company two years later during the Panic of 1873. By the early 1880s, the firm was producing a variety of iron and enamelware products. In 1883, Kohler put ornamental feet on a cast-iron water trough and sold it as a bathtub. Four years later, more than two-thirds of the company's business was in plumbing products and enamelware. In 1888, Kohler and two partners had the firm incorporated.

In 1899, Kohler purchased 21 acres of farmland four miles west of Sheboygan, intending to move his entire company to the location. Shortly after the new factory was constructed, in 1900, Kohler died at 56, likely of heart failure.

Five years later, 30-year-old Walter J. Kohler assumed his father's corporate presidency and began to guide the firm. In 1912, it was officially designated the Kohler Company, and the property surrounding the plant became the Village of Kohler.

== Civic leadership ==
From 1880 until his death Kohler served in several governmental offices. In 1892 he became Mayor of Sheboygan. Citizens also admired Kohler for his generous contributions and leadership in the areas of art and culture, symbols of Sheboygan's desire to be more than a factory town.

The John Michael Kohler Arts Center, which occupies a square block in downtown Sheboygan (containing Kohler's restored Gilded Age home along with modern buildings), is named for Kohler, as is John Michael Kohler State Park, established on land donated in 1966 by the Kohler family. The main highway into Sheboygan, Kohler Memorial Drive (which is routed as Wisconsin Highway 23), is also named for Kohler.

== Personal life ==
In 1871, Kohler married Elizabeth Vollrath (1848-1883), daughter of John Jacob Vollrath and Elisabeth Margaret Vollrath (née Fuchs), who both originally hailed from Rhineland-Palatinate. His father-in-law was the founder of The Vollrath Company and major steel industrialist in Sheboygan. They had six children;

- Evangeline Kohler (1872–1954), remained unmarried
- Robert J. Kohler (1873–1905)
- Walter J. Kohler Sr. (1875–1940) the 26th Governor of Wisconsin and father of Walter J. Kohler Jr., the 33rd Governor of Wisconsin.
- Marie Christine Kohler (1876–1943), remained unmarried
- Lillie Babette Kohler (1878–1965), remained unmarried
- Carl J. Kohler (1880–1904)

In 1887, four years after his wife Lillie's death, John married Lillie's sister, Wilhelmina "Minnie" Vollrath (1852–1929), and they had one child;

- Herbert Vollrath Kohler Sr. (1891–1968), became the dominant force in the Kohler Company, and presided over the longest strike in American history. He was the father of Herbert Vollrath Kohler, Ruth DeYoung Kohler and grandfather of K. David Kohler, who currently serves as the chair and chief executive officer of the Kohler Company.

The Kohler family home in Sheboygan was filled with music, books, and lessons in ethics and public service. The Sheboygan area mourned Kohler's 1900 death. John's three daughters remained in the Kohler house, unmarried, for the rest of their lives, frequently wearing black.
