= Ruth DeYoung Kohler =

American journalist

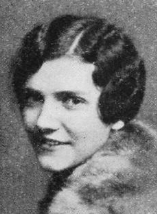
- In the Smith Alumnae Quarterly, May 1927
- Born: Ruth Miriam DeYoung; August 24, 1906; Harvey, Illinois, US
- Died: March 7, 1953 (aged 46); Kohler, Wisconsin, US
- Education: Smith College
- Occupation: Journalist
- Spouse: Herbert Vollrath Kohler Sr. (m. 1937)
- Children: 3

Ruth Miriam DeYoung Kohler (August 24, 1906 – March 7, 1953) was an American journalist and women's rights advocate.

== Life ==
Graves of Herbert and Ruth DeYoung Kohler at Woodland Kohler Village Cemetery

Kohler was born in 1906 in Harvey, Illinois to Mrs. and Mr. Frederic R. DeYoung. Her father was an Illinois Supreme Court Justice. She received a bachelor's degree from Smith College, where she studied history. She earned special honors and was a member of Phi Beta Kappa. Afterward, she traveled around Europe for a year. She married Herbert Vollrath Kohler Sr. in 1937. She had three children: Herbert Kohler Jr., born in 1939; Ruth DeYoung Kohler II, born in 1941; and Frederick Cornell Kohler, born in 1943. In 1953, at the age of 46, DeYoung Kohler died of a heart ailment at her home in Kohler, Wisconsin, and was buried at Woodland Kohler Village Cemetery.

== Career and honors ==
Kohler became a journalist in 1929, working for the Chicago Tribune. She went on to become the Women's Editor for the paper in 1935. From 1935 to 1937, she organized the Chicago Tribune's Women's Congress. The forum had over 5,000 attendees, and discussed women's issues and rights. She retired from her position as the Women's Editor in 1937, when she married. She remained involved in civic organizations throughout her life, particularly within Wisconsin. She led a radio program through WGN, and wrote a column about women's issues in 1940 for the Chicago Tribune. In 1948, she was the chairman of the Wisconsin Women's Committee. She served during Wisconsin's centennial celebration, where she published a book entitled The Story of Wisconsin Women. This book chronicled the lives and histories of over 1,500 women from Wisconsin. In 1949, she received the Theodora Youmans Award, given to her by the Wisconsin Federation of Women's Clubs for her civic contributions. She was also an active member of the Wisconsin Federation of Women's Clubs, and served on its board of directors. She also helped to build the Kohler Woman's Club to over 1,000 members. She was chair of the Kohler Women's Club, and also commissioner of the Kohler Girl Scout Council. She was one of the founding members of the Women's Auxiliary of the State Historical Society of Wisconsin which is now called The Friends of the WHS. She also helped to restore the Wade House, a historic site in Greenbush, Wisconsin. Kohler devoted over three years of her life to the restoration of the house, which was completed in 1953, but she died before she could see the project completed.
