= John Saladino =

American interior designer (1939–2025)

John F. Saladino
- Born: July 23, 1939; Kansas City, Missouri, U.S.
- Died: July 26, 2025 (aged 86); Montecito, California, U.S.
- Education: Yale School of Art and Architecture
- Occupation: Interior designer
- Website: saladinostyle.com

John Francis Saladino (July 23, 1939 – July 26, 2025) was an American interior designer, furniture designer and garden designer, based in New York City.

== Background ==
Saladino was born in Kansas City, Missouri on July 23, 1939. He graduated from Notre Dame and the Yale School of Art and Architecture.

Saladino died at his home in Montecito, California, on July 26, 2025, at the age of 86.

== Career ==
After graduation he worked with Italian architect Piero Sartogo in Rome.

Saladino established the Saladino Group, Inc. in 1972 in New York City.

His practice has a staff of around 30 and has undertaken office and residential design projects.

The design studio has completed numerous residential and corporate interior design projects, most of which draw heavily from traditional European influences. As well as undertaking interior design projects his practice also designs furniture.

His designs have appeared in Dunbar, Bloomingdale's, and Baker Furniture.

Saladino purchased a historic 1920s stone villa and estate grounds, located in Montecito, California, in 2001. His restoration project there involved reconstruction, new construction, interior design, and landscape design. It was completed in 2004. Villa is his well illustrated book about the project.

=== Boards ===
Saladino served as a board member for a number of organizations, including Parsons School of Design, New York School of Interior Design, Save Venice, and the Sir John Soane Museum Foundation in London.

=== Books ===
- Style by Saladino—by John Saladino, published by Frances Lincoln in October 2000.
- Villa—by John Saladino, published by Frances Lincoln in March 2009.

== See also ==
- Interior designers
