= Kohler Design Center =

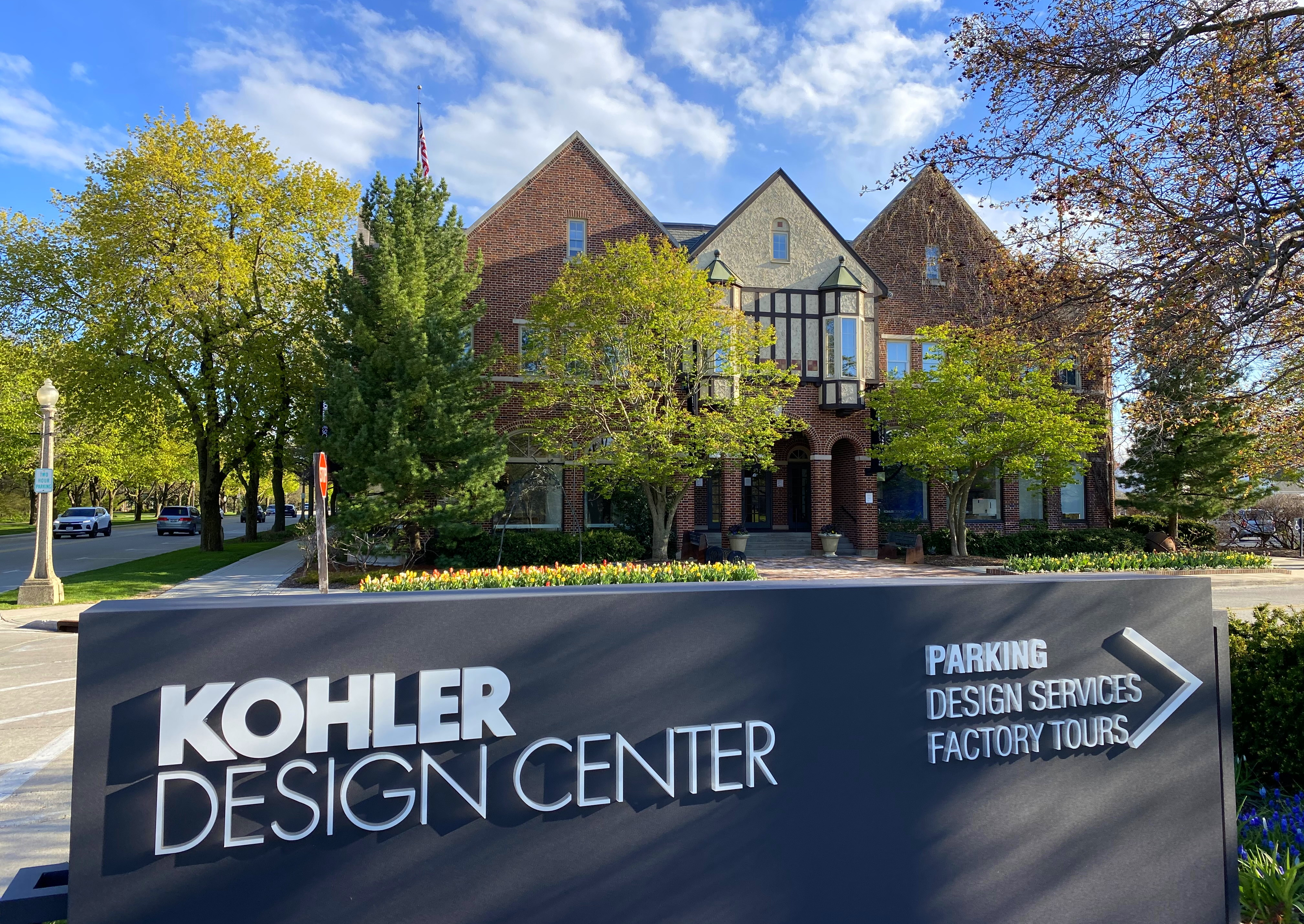
- Established: 1985
- Location: 101 Upper Road; Kohler, Wisconsin
- Coordinates: 43.7420184°N 87.7803131°W
- Type: Showroom, museum
- Owner: Kohler Company
- Website: kohlerdesigncenter.com

The Kohler Design Center is the Kohler Company museum showcase of product design in Kohler, Wisconsin.

The main floor showcases the products of the companies that comprise the Kohler family of businesses. It features Kohler's own "great wall of china," a floor-to-ceiling display of plumbing fixtures in all shapes, sizes and colors. The lower level features the Kohler Company Museum. Visitors can watch a short film and view displays from the company's establishment in 1873 as a maker of cast iron farm implements. Also in the lower level is an arts gallery developed by the John Michael Kohler Arts Center.

The building was originally used as a recreation hall for Kohler village residents. In 1985, it was transformed into a 36,000-square-foot showcase for the extensive array of Kohler Company products.

Visitors can not make product purchases at the Kohler Design Center.

== See also ==
- Kohler Company
