= Kohler Environmental Center =

Building at Choate Rosemary Hall, Connecticut, USA

- Alternative names: KEC

General information
- Type: Education, laboratories, dormitories
- Location: 867 Old Durham Road, Wallingford, CT 06492, Wallingford, Connecticut, United States of America
- Coordinates: 41°27′36″N 72°47′49″W
- Groundbreaking: April 1, 2011

Technical details
- Material: Timber and fieldstone
- Floor area: 31,325 sq. feet

Design and construction
- Architecture firm: Robert A.M. Stern Architects
- Structural engineer: DeStefano & Chamberlain, Inc.
- Civil engineer: Land-Tech Consultants, Inc.
- Other designers: Landscape: Andropogon Associates, Ltd. Interior design: Robert A.M. Stern Interiors, LLC
- Awards: 2017 AIA CAE Education Facility Design Awards

The Kohler Environmental Center (KEC) is a net-zero energy usage living and learning center for Choate Rosemary Hall. Situated among 268 acres of meadows, second-growth forests, wetlands, and agricultural fields the KEC provides total environmental immersion for its 20-student cohorts each year. Construction of the building was funded primarily through donation of Herbert Kohler Jr., then chairman of the Choate board of trustees and chairman and CEO of Kohler Co. Groundbreaking was April 1, 2011 and the building was completed the following year.

== Design ==
The KEC's green building design is informed by its goal to be a net-zero energy consumer. With a LEED-platinum certification, the building boasts roof mounted thermal solar panels, hardware to process waste cooking oil, and a 294-kilowatt photovoltaic array. Monitoring systems keep track of both net-energy usage as well as individual power draw from rooms or facilities—like the greenhouse or labs. Furthermore, the KEC construction includes a high-efficiency building envelope, designed for thermal insulation, as well as an efficient, complex system of daylight energy and heat harvesting. The tower over the lobby vesitbule acts as a thermal chimney, enhancing the natural stack effect along with convection to vent hot the air out of the building at a high point, while drawing cooler air in at low points.

The facade is rustic in style—constructed out of stained cedar trim, fiber cement plank siding, and native fieldstone, while the interior makes use of reclaimed maple wood from Vermont syrup farms. On some interior panels, former knots in the maple wood can be seen where sap taps were installed.

Living and learning facilities include two apartments for house advisors' families, 14 dorm rooms—featuring rooms for two students and single rooms, common spaces, classrooms, and labs.

== See also ==
- Choate Rosemary Hall
- Green buildings
- Green buildings in the United States
