= Mark Hoplamazian =

Armenian-American businessman

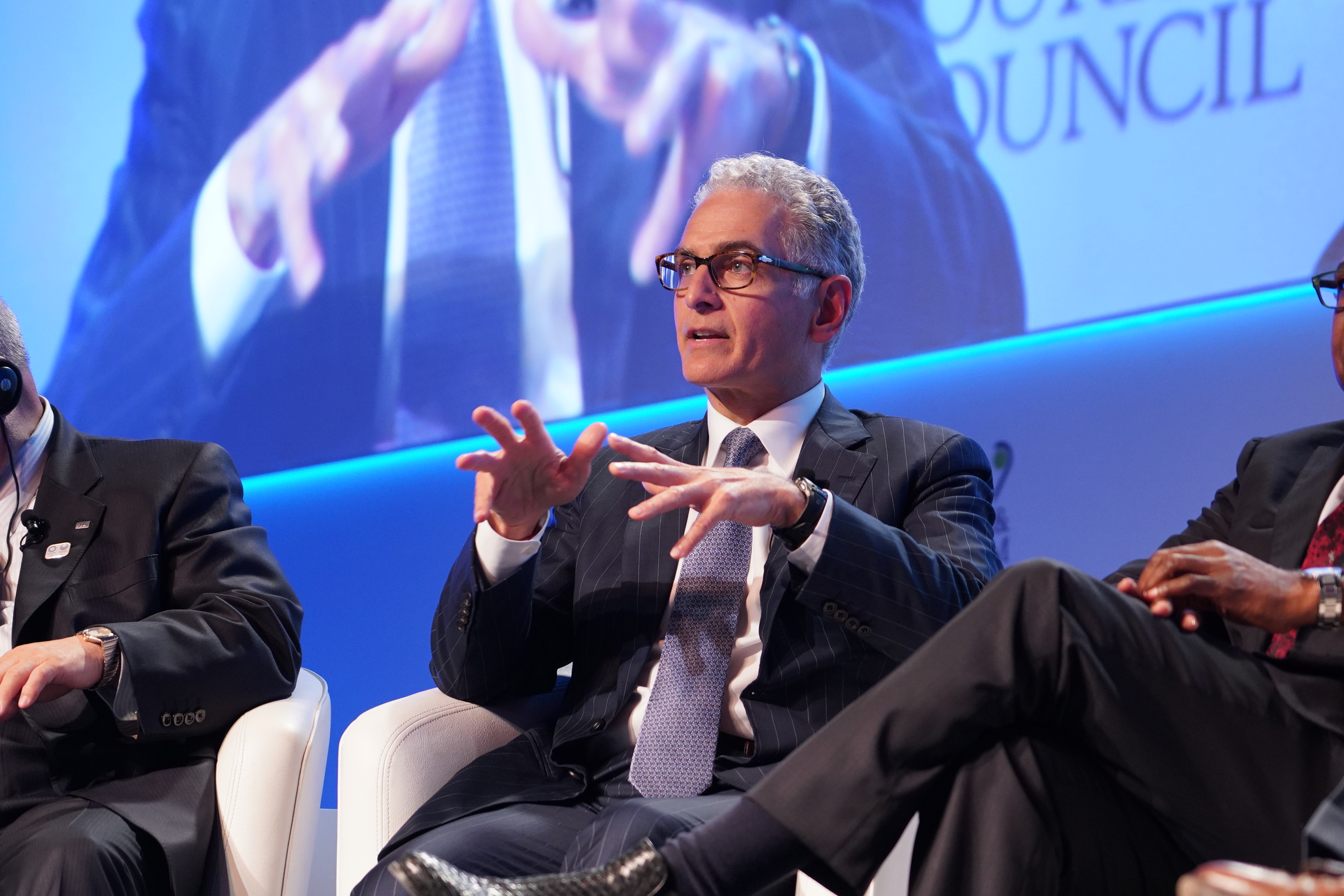
- Hoplamazian in 2018
- Born: November 27, 1963 (age 62); Bryn Mawr, Pennsylvania, U.S.
- Education: Episcopal Academy
- Alma mater: Harvard University (BA); University of Chicago (MBA)
- Title: President and CEO, Hyatt Hotels
- Spouse: Rachel DeYoung Kohler (m. 1991)
- Children: 3
- Relatives: Herbert Kohler Jr. (father-in-law)

Mark Samuel Hoplamazian (born November 27, 1963) is an Armenian American businessman, who has been the president and CEO of Hyatt Hotels Corporation since December 2006. In 2026, he also became chairman.

Through marriage he is a member of the Kohler family.

== Early life and education ==
Hoplamazian was born on November 27, 1963 in Bryn Mawr, Pennsylvania to Harry (1924–1977) and Victoria (née Sarkisian) Hoplamazian (1924–2022).

His father was a landscape gardener and owner of Mayfield Gardens, Inc. in Newtown Square, Pennsylvania. He has two brothers and two sisters, and is of Armenian descent.

He was educated at the private Episcopal Academy in Newtown Square, and received his BA in economics from Harvard College, and his MBA from the University of Chicago Booth School of Business.

== Career ==
Between 1985 and 1987, Hoplamazian worked for First Boston Corporation in New York City as a financial analyst. Since 1987, he has been employed in the Pritzker Organization, where he last was executive president, where he worked under Jay Pritzker and primarily managed their family office. In 1988, he was a summer associate at Boston Consulting Group. He was a vice president of the Hyatt Global Corporation since 2004, and president since 2006.

== Personal life ==
On September 28, 1991, he married Rachel DeYoung Kohler (b. 1963), daughter of billionaire businessman Herbert Kohler Jr. (1939–2022). They have three children, Mara, Lena and Leo.

The family resides in the Lincoln Park neighborhood in Chicago.
