= Kohler family of Wisconsin =

Kohler
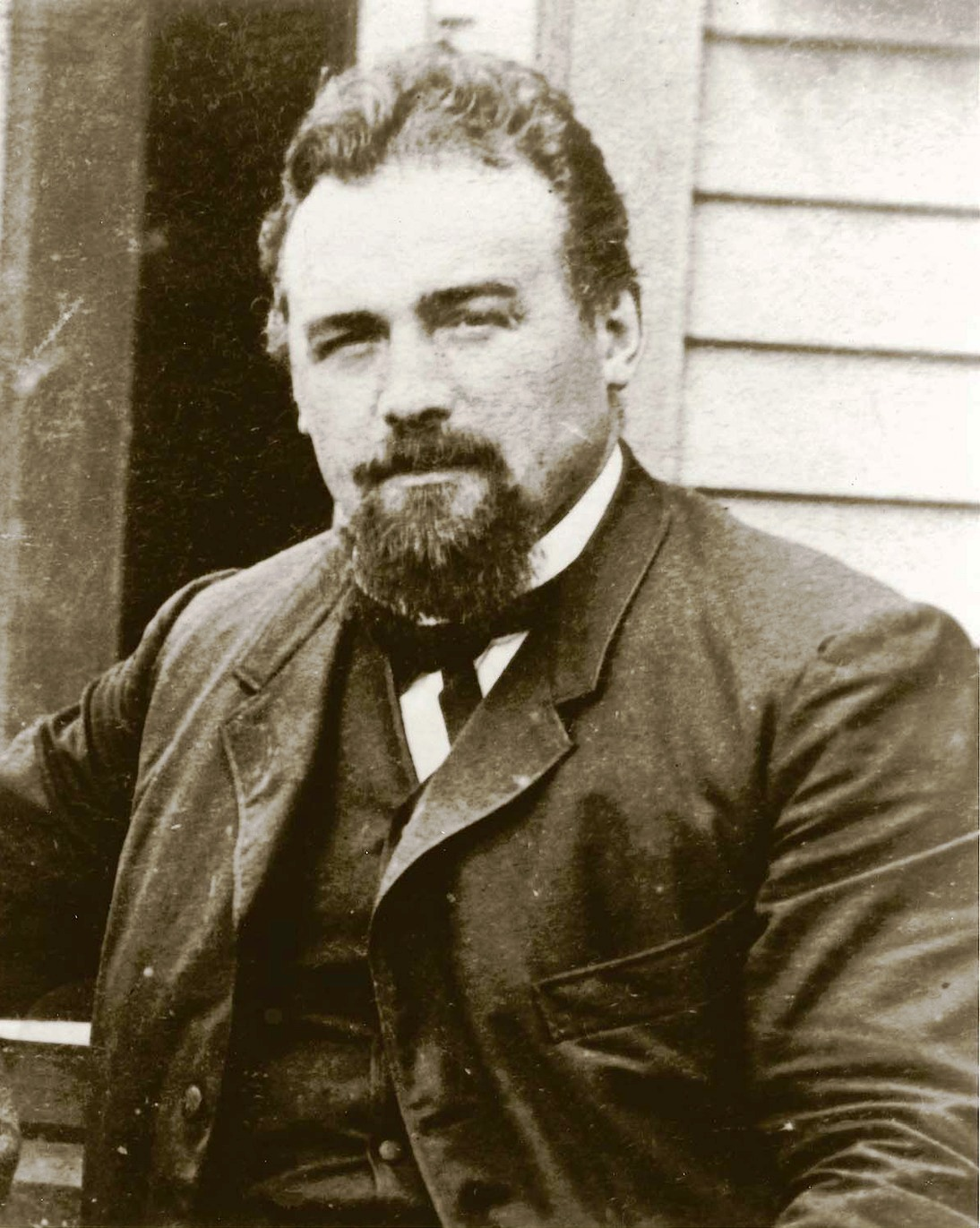
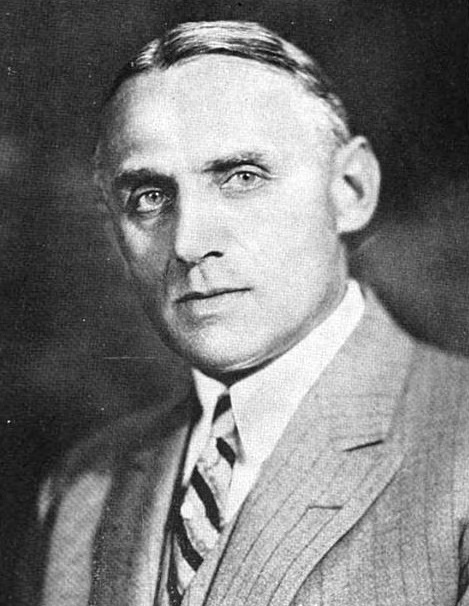
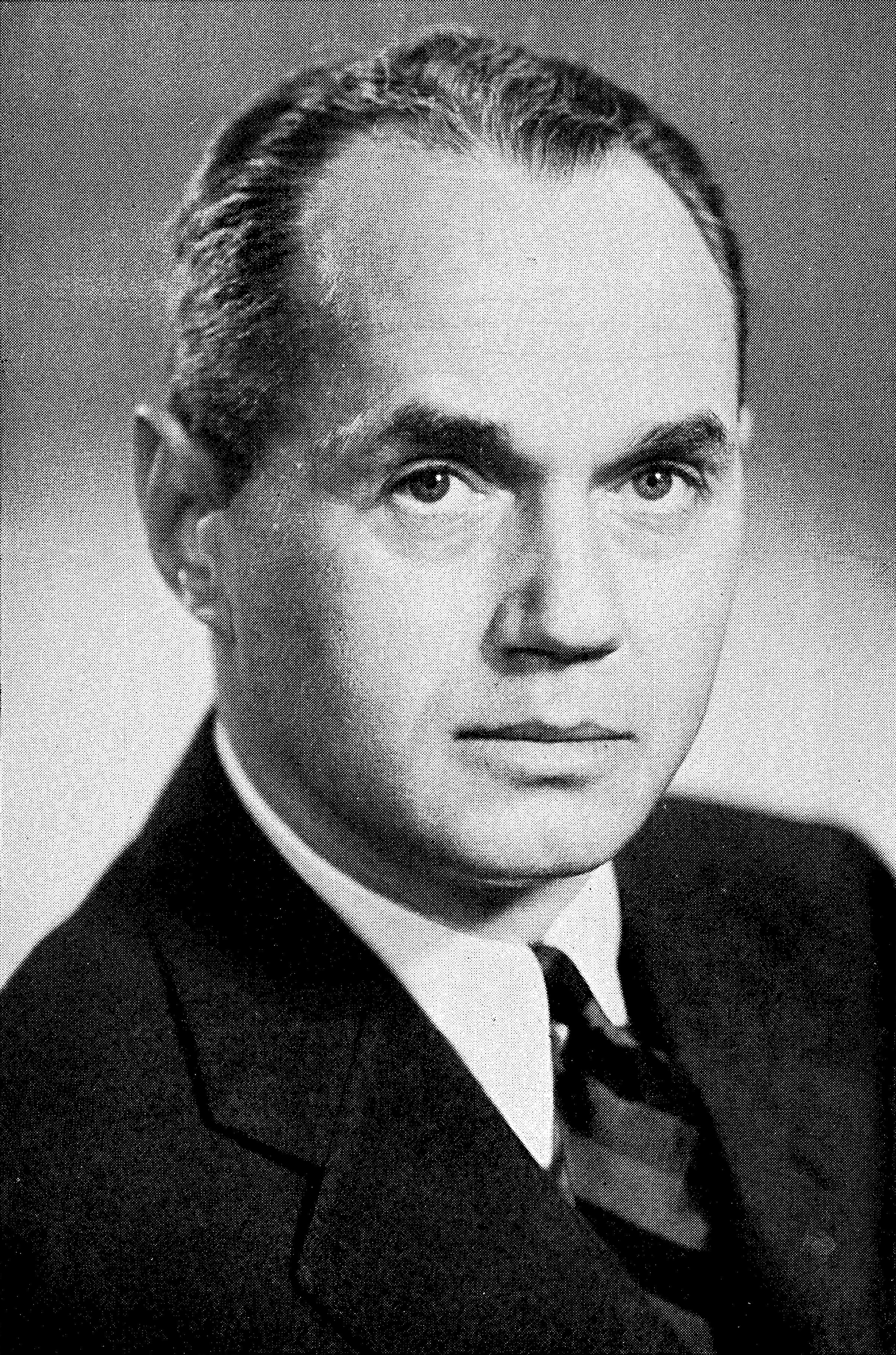
- John Michael Kohler Walter Jodok Kohler Sr. Walter Jodok Kohler Jr.
- Etymology: German: occupational name for a charcoal burner, from Middle High German kol ‘(char)coal’ + the agent suffix -er. The form Kohler is South German; elsewhere it is usually written Köhler
- Origin: Schnepfau, Austria
- Members: Herbert Kohler Jr.; John Michael Kohler; Terry Kohler; Walter J. Kohler Jr.; Walter J. Kohler Sr.
- Estate: Kohler Estate

The Kohler family of Wisconsin is a family notable for its prominence in business, society, and politics in the U.S. state of Wisconsin during the 19th, 20th and 21st centuries. Its members include two Governors of Wisconsin, and the founder and executives of Kohler Co., a Wisconsin-based manufacturing and hospitality company.

== Background ==
The Kohler family traces their origin to the village of Schnepfau in Vorarlberg, Austria. The American branch is descended from Johann Michael Kohler Sr. (1805–1874), a dairy farmer, who emigrated to Minnesota in 1864 with his second wife and eight children. John Michael Kohler formed the industrial branch of the family as he moved to Sheboygan, Wisconsin in 1871.

== Family tree ==
The following chart uses a modified d'Aboville numbering. The redundant leading 1 has been omitted. The generation is shown by the number of digits in the descendant's index number.

1. Child
2. Grandchild
3. Great-grandchild
4. Great-great-grandchild

In the chart, direct descendants of John M. Kohler II are indicated with a blue or yellow background. Persons with Wikipedia biographies are indicated with a heavy border with a blue border for a deceased person and a green border for a living person.

Family tree

John Michael Kohler II; 1844–1900
m1. 1871; Elizabeth Lillie Vollrath dau. of Jacob Vollrath; 1848–1883
1 Evangelina Kohler; 1872–1954
2 Robert John Kohler; 1873–1905
3 Walter Jodok Kohler Sr. 1875–1940
m.1900 Charlotte Schroeder; 1869–1947
3.1 John Michael Kohler III; 1902–1968
m.1933 Julilly House; 1908–1976
3.1.1 John Michael Kohler IV; 1934–
3.1.2 William Collin Kohler; 1937–
3.1.3 Julilly Waller Kohler; 1942–
m.1972 Charles Joseph Hausmann; 1945–
3.1.3.1 Julilly Kohler-Hausmann; 1975–
3.1.3.2 Issa Brooke Kohler-Hausmann; 1978–
3.1.4 Marie House Kohler; 1951–
3.2 Walter Jodok Kohler Jr. 1904–1976
m1.1932–1946 Marie Celeste McVoy; 1900–1974
3.2.1 Terry Jodok Kohler; 1934–2016
3.2.2 Charlotte Nicolette Kohler; 1936–2012
m2.1948 Charlotte McAleer; 1912–1995
3.3 Carl James Kohler; 1905–1960
m.1925 Dorothy L. Dings; 1905–1989
3.3.1 Carl James Kohler Jr; 1926–1981
3.3.2 Conrad D Kohler; 1929–1980
3.3.3 Walter J Kohler III; 1932–1998
m1.1954 Susan Nall; 1934–1988
m2.1963 Mary Riddell; 1937–
3.3.4 Peter Galt Kohler; 1934–2007
m2.1954 Nancy B Bahler; 1935–2014
3.4 Robert Eugene Kohler Sr; 1908–1990
m1.1933 Margaret Brewster Taylor; 1908–1987
m2.1989 Martha Seymour Thorkelson; 1909–1992
4 Marie Christine Kohler; 1876–1943
5 Lillie Babette Kohler; 1877–1965
6 Carl Jakob Kohler; 1880–1904
m2. 1887; Wilhelmina Minnie Vollrath dau. of Jacob Vollrath sister of Lillie Vollrath; 1852–1929
7 Herbert Vollrath Kohler Sr; 1891–1968
m. 1937; Ruth Miriam DeYoung; 1906–1953
7.1 Herbert Vollrath Kohler Jr. 1939–2022
m1.1961 Linda Karger; 1939–2005
7.1.1 Laura Elizabeth Kohler; 1962–
7.1.2 Rachel DeYoung Kohler; 1963–
m.1991 Mark Hoplamazian; 1963–
7.1.3 David Karger Kohler; 1966–
m2.1988 Natalie Ann Black; 1950–2024
7.2 Ruth DeYoung Kohler II; 1941–2020
7.3 Frederick Cornell Kohler; 1943–1998

== List of notable members ==
Chronological by birth:

- John Michael Kohler II (1844–1900), patriarch
- Walter Jodok Kohler Sr. (1875–1940), son
- Marie Christine Kohler (1876–1943), daughter
- Walter Jodok Kohler Jr. (1904–1976), grandson
- Julilly House (1908–1976), granddaughter-in-law
- Terry Jodok Kohler (1934–2016), great-grandson
- Herbert Vollrath Kohler Jr. (1939–2022), grandson
- Marie House Kohler (born 1951), great-granddaughter
- David Karger Kohler (born 1966), great-grandson

== See also ==
- List of United States political families - The Kohlers
