= Kohler Interiors =

- Company type: Division
- Headquarters: Kohler, Wisconsin, U.S.
- Key people: Rachel Kohler, Group President
- Products: Furniture, title and decorative products
- Parent: Kohler Company
- Subsidiaries: Ann Sacks; Baker Furniture; Dapha, Ltd. French Heritage Furniture; Mark David; McGuire Furniture
- Website: www.us.kohler.com

Kohler Interiors is the furniture, title and decorative products division of the Kohler Company. It includes six subsidiaries.

== Subsidiaries ==
=== Ann Sacks ===
The Kohler Company acquired Ann Sacks in 1989 from teacher and owner Ann Sacks. In 2011, Ann Sacks opened an international showroom in London. Since its start in 1980, Ann Sacks has been based in Portland, Oregon, where it creates handcrafted tile, stone, and luxury plumbing fixtures.

=== McGuire Furniture ===
Founded by John and Elinor McGuire in 1948, McGuire Furniture was acquired in 1989 by the Kohler Company. The company creates high-end designer furniture of bamboo, laced rawhide, and aluminum in San Francisco. Baker is sold at Marshall Field's and Macy's, in addition to a flagship store in Chicago.

=== Mark David ===
In May 2008, the Kohler Company acquired Mark David, an upscale provider of upholstered seating to the hospitality industry. Mark David was founded by brothers Mark and David Norcross in 1990 as a privately held, family-owned company, and became a supplier of case goods and seating to hospitality properties throughout the United States. As of 2015, Kohler has ceased producing custom contract furniture and Mark David was no longer taking new orders.

== Sale to Samson Holdings ==
In 2017, Kohler agreed to sell the Baker, Milling Road and McGuire luxury furniture brands to Samson Investment Holding Company, based in High Point, North Carolina. Samson already owns and operates furniture manufacturing companies in the middle and upper price point segments of the home furnishings industry.
