= 2015 Kohler strike =

Labor dispute in Wisconsin, United States

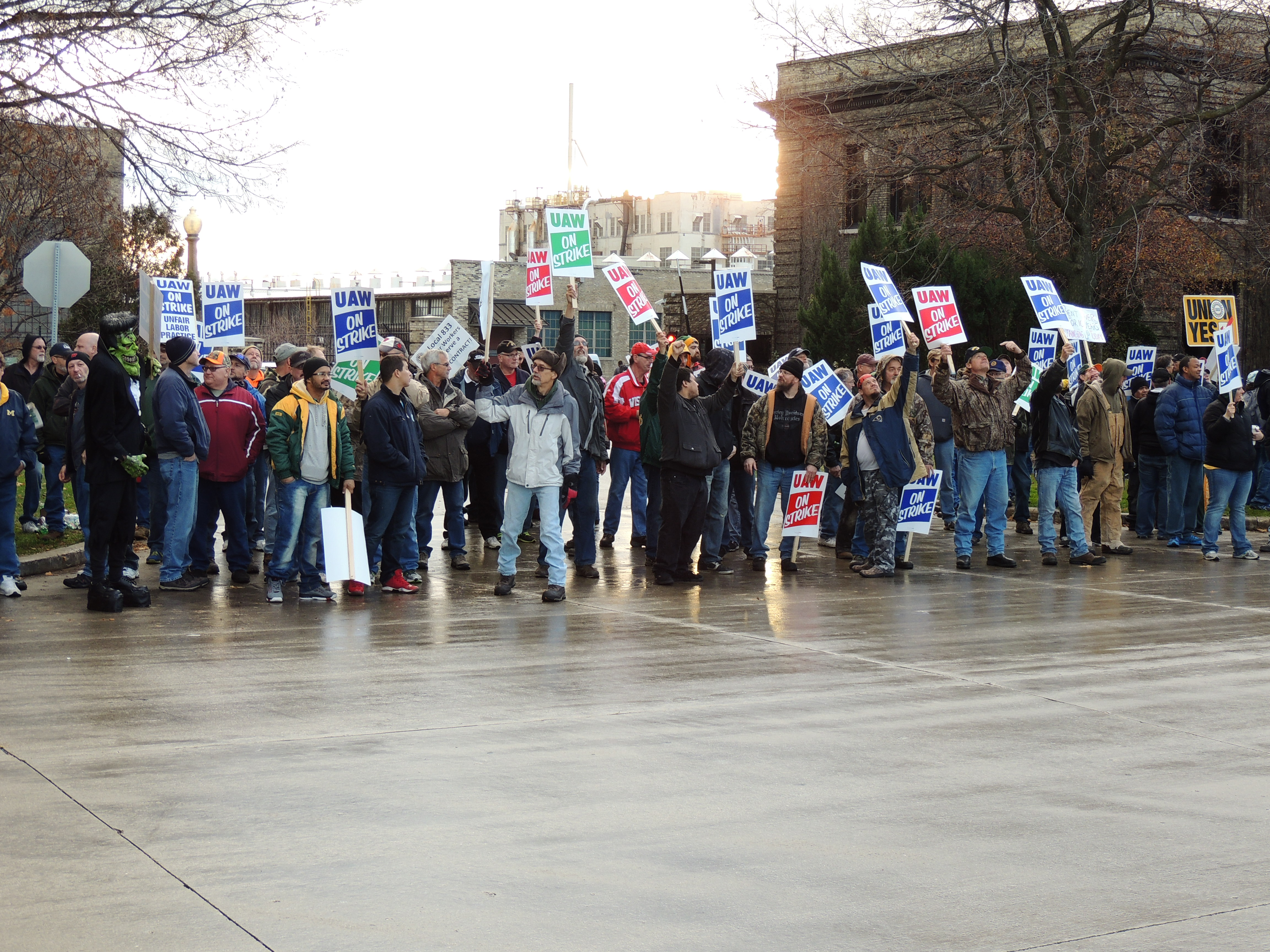
Workers strike outside the Kohler Company headquarters

The 2015 Kohler Strike is the fourth strike in the 142-year-old history of the Kohler Company in Kohler, Wisconsin.

== Background ==
In December 2010, the Kohler Company and United Auto Workers Local 833 reached agreement on a new five-year labor contract, that covered approximately 2,300 union workers at the company's two Sheboygan County, Wisconsin manufacturing locations. The contract passed 1,152 to 717, with 62 percent of union members voting to ratify the deal and 38 percent voting no. Throughout negotiations, Kohler Company officials insisted labor concessions were needed as the company's Sheboygan County manufacturing plants are easily the company's most expensive to operate, and products produced there are no longer competitive.

The deal included a five-year wage freeze, higher health care premiums and the creation of a two-tiered wage and benefit system. It also allowed for the limited use of temporary workers.

== Past strikes ==
The first Kohler Company strike, which began in 1934, lasted seven years and resulted in the shooting deaths of two strikers during a riot outside the company’s factory. The second strike was in 1954 and lasted 6 years. It was marred by acts of violence and vandalism. The third strike, which occurred in 1983 and lasted several weeks, saw car windows smashed by demonstrators and two union members injured by a motorist who drove his vehicle through a picket line.

== Timeline ==
=== Before the strike ===
The Board of Directors of the Kohler Company elected David Kohler the company president and CEO on April 29, 2015, passing leadership of the family business to Herbert Kohler, Sr. grandson. The 76 year old Herbert Kohler, Jr. would continue as company chairman and would oversee the company's hospitality and real estate group.

On November 11, 2015, the Milwaukee Journal Sentinel reported negotiations between the company and the United Auto Workers were continuing, but with a deadline laid down by the union approaching, the two sides were "not even close to an agreement," said Tim Tayloe, president of UAW Local 833.

On November 13, workers held an informational picket outside the Kohler Company owned-and-operated The American Club ahead of a possible strike.

On November 14, the Kohler Company released its "last, best and final offer."

=== The strike begins ===
On the morning of November 15, 2015, an estimated 1,800 UAW Union members attended a meeting at Sheboygan South High School. 94 percent voted down the proposed Kohler Company proposal and approving a strike. The second day of the strike on November 16 began with workers marching 1.58 miles from Emil Mazey Hall in the Town of Sheboygan to the Kohler Company Headquarters. Closed entrances to the company campus caused traffic congestion for morning commute with traffic backed up into nearby cities of Sheboygan and Sheboygan Falls. About 150 union employees were blocking the only company entrance as of 6 a.m. and preventing non-union employees from entering. Three days into the strike on November 17, Sheboygan County Judge James Bolgert issued a temporary injunction barring picketers from interfering with traffic near Kohler Company property. The temporary injunction issued Tuesday bars demonstrators from interfering with traffic on public roads and with vehicles entering or leaving Kohler Co. property. It also restricts picketers from seizing and occupying Kohler property, including driveways. On the fourth day of the strike, UAW Local 833 told Wisconsin Public Radio that the company has not responded to a request for more contract talks.

During the first week of the strike, the Village of Kohler has also asked for help from the Sheboygan County Sheriff's Office and the neighboring Sheboygan Falls Police Department with traffic control.

On the seventh day of the strike, union members and supporters held mass picket in support of striking Kohler Company workers on November 21 at the company’s American Club during its popular Wisconsin Holiday Market. The street in front of the American Club and the Kohler Company headquarters was closed to traffic during the picket.

=== Resolution ===
After 32 days, the strike ended as UAW Local 833 and Kohler struck a deal which was ratified by 91% of the union. The deal secured wage increases for Tier A and B employees, narrowing the pay gap between new hires and older workers. Pension benefits were improved and healthcare premium increases were minimized.
