= Marie Kohler =

American writer and playwright (born 1951)

Marie House Kohler
- Born: February 8, 1951 (age 75); Sheboygan, Wisconsin
- Occupation: Playwright

Marie House Kohler (born 1951) is an American writer and playwright. She is a member of the Kohler family of Wisconsin.

== Biography ==
Playwright, theater producer, director and writer, Marie Kohler is the daughter of John Michael Kohler III and Julilly House. Raised in Kohler, Wisconsin at Riverbend, the home built by her grandfather Gov. Walter J. Kohler in 1923. Marie Kohler graduated from Kohler High School in 1969 and holds an Honors BA from Harvard University (1973, Magna Cum Laude) and an MA from the University of Wisconsin–Milwaukee(1979) – both degrees in English Literature.

Kohler co-founded Renaissance Theaterworks in Milwaukee, Wisconsin in 1993, with four other female theater professionals to create more opportunities for women in theater. She served there as Co-Artistic Director until 2013 and as Resident Playwright through 2019.

== Career/personal life ==
Kohler's interest in theater began early, when her mother took her to local and national productions. She formed the first drama club of her high school, earning her the school's first "Humanities Award." In college, she performed with the Harvard Dramatic Society, where she met Colin Cabot; they married in 1974. The couple moved back to Wisconsin where Cabot worked at the Skylight Music Theatre. After the birth of their daughter, Anne, the family moved to Europe for a year when Cabot served as assistant to opera composer Gian Carlo Menotti in Scotland and Italy. When the couple returned to Milwaukee, Kohler began her master's work at the University of Wisconsin–Milwaukee, completing her degree in 1979. Their second daughter, Marie Christine, was born the same year. In 1980, Kohler began freelancing as a journalist for various Milwaukee- and Wisconsin-based publications, as well as national publications, such as American Theater Magazine and National Trust Magazine.

In the mid-1980s, Kohler and Cabot separated, and Kohler turned her attention to acting, writing plays and freelance journalism.

In 1989, Kohler met Brian Mani while performing in Great Expectations; they married in 1992. Mani had a daughter, Tricia Hooper. Kohler has written several roles for Mani, a classically trained actor with American Players Theatre; they have worked often together on plays she has produced or directed. She has written six plays, all professionally produced and garnering strong notice and awards. The Milwaukee Arts Board named her Artist of the Year (2005).

Kohler served on the board of the Wisconsin Humanities Council and commits herself to environmental, cultural and social causes.

== Written Works ==
=== A Girl of the Limberlost (1993) ===
- Adapted from Gene Stratton Porter's 1909 classic novel.
- Premiered at Children's Theater of Madison (Madison, WI) in 1993.
- Published by YouthPLAYS

=== Counting Days (1995) ===
- An intimate exploration of Katherine Mansfield’s journals.
- Premiered at Renaissance Theaterworks (Milwaukee, WI) in 1995.

=== Midnight and Moll Flanders (2000) ===
- A free adaptation of Daniel Defoe's classic novel Moll Flanders.
- Premiered at Renaissance Theaterworks in collaboration with University of Wisconsin–Milwaukee in 2000.
- Published by Dramatic Publishing

=== Boswell's Dreams (2005) ===
- Premiered at Renaissance Theaterworks (Milwaukee, WI) in 2005.

=== The Dig (2008) ===
- Premiered at Renaissance Theaterworks (Milwaukee, WI) in 2009

=== Boswell (2019) ===
- Adapted from BOSWELL'S DREAMS.
- Premiered at Festival Fringe (Edinburgh, Scotland) in 2019.
- Published by Dramatic Publishing

=== Maybe We'll Fly (2026) ===
- Will premiere at Milwaukee Chamber Theatre (Milwaukee, WI) in 2026.

== Directing credits ==
=== Productions ===
- THE CHILDREN by Lucy Kirkwood, Next Act Theatre – 2025
- OLD COMISKEY PARK by Peter Filichia, Within These Walls Monologue Festival, Forward Theater Co. – 2021
- HAPPY DAYS by Samuel Beckett, Renaissance Theaterworks – 2020
- BOSWELL by Marie Kohler (co-directed with Laura Gordon), Edinburgh Fringe Festival – 2019
- DEAR ELIZABETH by Sarah Ruhl, Milwaukee Chamber Theatre – 2015
- THE KREUTZER SONATA by Nancy Harris, Renaissance Theaterworks – 2015
- HONOUR' by Joanna Murray-Smith, Renaissance Theaterworks – 2012
- A PHOENIX TOO FREQUENT by Christopher Fry, Renaissance Theaterworks – 2012

=== Staged Readings ===
- THE CHILDREN by Lucy Kirkwood, Third Avenue Playhouse (via Zoom) – 2021
- DUCK by Christine Kallmann, St. John's on the Lake – 2017
- DUCK by Christine Kallmann, Brink New Plays, Renaissance Theaterworks – 2016
- TRIFLES by Susan Glaspell, American Players Theatre – 2016
- FOG by Eugene O’Neill, American Players Theatre – 2016
- CENSORED ON FINAL APPROACH by Phylis Ravel, Milwaukee VA Medical Center – 2013
- 'THE IMPORTANCE OF BEING EARNEST by Oscar Wilde, Renaissance Theaterworks – 2005

== Journalism ==
Kohler has been a freelance journalist for Wisconsin and national publications since 1980. She has written film reviews for the Milwaukee Sentinel; theater reviews for Art Muscle; feature articles for Milwaukee Magazine; essays for Milwaukee Footlights, Shepherd Express and The Wisconsin Academy Review; and pieces for American Theater Magazine. She has also been published in National Trust Magazine, Great Lakes Stages and Milwaukee Metro.

Her articles explore a range of subjects – from Wisconsin's tradition of Friday night fish fries to Frank Lloyd Wright's architecture to airport mosaics to trends in theater and film.

=== American Theatre Magazine ===
- A Volley of Plays
- X Marks the Spot

=== Shepherd Express ===
- Milwaukee's Grassroots Storytellers - Ex Fabula’s community-building ‘Close Encounters’
- From Milwaukee to Broadway and Back - A conversation with Chike Johnson
- Fabulous Stories - Ex Fabula’s new Executive Director Megan McGee
- Listening, Not Just Talking! Anne Strainchamps on Wisconsin Public Radio
- INVIVO's Maurice Dumit on Health and Fitness
- Leslie Fitzwater: 'Once More with Feeling'…Piaf
- CORE/El Centro's Healing Center
- Secrets of the Milwaukee Public Museum
- Beans and Barley's Long-Term Success
- Dialogue with Laura Gordon
- Josh Jaszewski - Theatergoer Extraordinaire
- The Renewed Surprising Appeal of Mah Jongg
- Indian Mounds: Wisconsin's Priceless Archaeological Treasures
- Frank Lloyd Wright's Burnham Street Vision
- Carlos Alves Beautifies Mitchell Airport
- Dermond Peterson's Stunning, Milwaukee-Made Textiles
- Bringing the Story Home
- The Look of Law and Money

=== Milwaukee Magazine ===
- Old Money
- The Gathering

=== Wisconsin Academy Review ===
- MIDSUMMER in October - An End of Season Bow

=== Milwaukee Metro ===
- The Sendik Legacy

=== Milwaukee Footlights ===
- A Carver of Bears

== Awards ==
=== A GIRL OF THE LIMBERLOST ===
- Julie Harris Playwright Award, Beverly Hills Theatre Guild, Honorable Mention - 2014

=== COUNTING DAYS ===
- Best New Regional Play, American Theatre Critics Association - 1995
- New Play Festival, Charlotte Repertory Theatre, Finalist - 1995
- Susan Smith Blackburn Prize, Nominee - 1995

=== MIDNIGHT and MOLL FLANDERS ===
- Best New Play - Milwaukee Magazine - 2000
- Inkslinger Playwriting Competition, Semi-finalist - 2018

=== BOSWELL'S DREAMS ===
- Susan Smith Blackburn Prize - Nominee - 2005
- Best of Year - Milwaukee Magazine - 2005
- Abingdon Award - Finalist - 2005
- Wisconsin Wrights - Finalist - 2005

=== THE DIG ===
- Susan Smith Blackburn Prize - Nominee - 2009
- Playwrights' Center Lab - Finalist - 2009
- Playwrights First - Semi-finalist - 2009

=== WITCH HOUSE ===
- Todd McNerney Playwriting Award, Finalist - 2017
- Wisconsin Wrights New Play Festival, Finalist - 2017

=== Career Awards ===
- Artist of the Year, Milwaukee Arts Board, 2005
- Friend of the Arts, Milwaukee Arts Board, 2020
- Fellow, Wisconsin Academy of Sciences, Arts & Letters, 2024
