= David Kohler =

American businessman

- Born: June 9, 1966 (age 60); Kohler, Wisconsin, US
- Education: Duke University (BA); Kellogg School of Management (MBA)
- Occupations: Chair and CEO, Kohler Company
- Spouses: Elizabeth Waddell; Nina Brookhart
- Children: 4
- Parent: Herbert Kohler Jr.

Karger David Kohler (born June 9, 1966) is an American businessman, serving as the chair and chief executive officer (CEO) of Kohler Company. He is the fourth generation of the Kohler family of Wisconsin to lead the company since its inception in 1873. Kohler sits on the Green Bay Packers board of directors.

== Early life and education ==
David Kohler was born June 9, 1966, to Herbert Kohler Jr. and Linda Kohler (née Karger). His siblings are Laura Elizabeth Kohler and Rachel DeYoung Kohler.

Kohler graduated from Duke University with a bachelor's degree in political science. He earned his MBA from the Kellogg School of Management at Northwestern University in 1992. Earlier, from 1988 to 1990, Kohler worked at Kohler Co. as a corporate business analyst, a foreman in the cast iron foundry, and as a materials analyst for Kohler Engines. After graduating from Kellogg, Kohler worked in management positions at Dayton-Hudson Corporation.

== Career ==
Kohler joined the Kohler Co. executive management team in 1993, when he was appointed director – fixtures marketing for Plumbing North America. He was named vice president – sales for Plumbing North America in 1995, and sector president – Plumbing North America the following year. In 1999, Kohler was named group president of the Kitchen & Bath Group and elected to the Kohler Co. board of directors. In 2007, he was elected to the position of executive vice president – Kohler Co. and a member of the executive committee. In 2009, Kohler was appointed president and chief operating officer. He became president and chief executive officer of the company in April 2015. Kohler was general chairman for the 2015 PGA Championship at Whistling Straits and is served as general chair for the 2021 Ryder Cup at Whistling Straits.

Kohler is also on the board of directors of Interface, Inc., Atlanta, Georgia; Interceramic, Chihuahua, Mexico; and the Green Bay Packers. He is a past chairman of the National Kitchen and Bath Association's board of governors of manufacturing, a former member of the board of directors of Menasha Corporation and past chairman of the Young Presidents’ Organization, Intercontinental Chapter.

In September 2022, Kohler was elected board chair of Kohler Co. following the death of his father, who had served as chairman since 1972.
