= Jacob Vollrath =

American industrialist

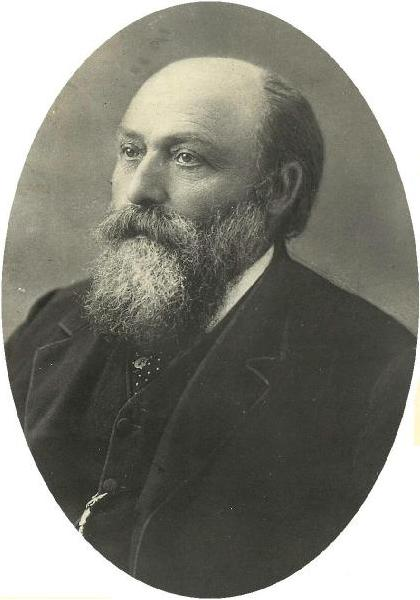
- Born: Jacob Johann Vollrath; September 19, 1824; Dörrebach, Rhineland
- Died: May 15, 1898 (aged 73); Sheboygan, Wisconsin
- Known for: Founding of The Vollrath Company
- Spouse: Elizabeth Margaret Fuchs

Jacob Johann Vollrath (September 19, 1824 – May 15, 1898) was an industrialist in the city of Sheboygan, Wisconsin in the United States. He founded The Vollrath Company.

Vollrath was born on September 19, 1824 in Dörrebach in the Prussian Rhineland, where he learned the trade of molding (casting of wrought iron).

He migrated to the United States in the 1840s and settled in Sheboygan in 1853. In 1874 he began to manufacture porcelain enamelware made of cast iron coated with ceramic glaze. In 1884 he founded the Jacob J. Vollrath Manufacturing Company, which grew steadily under his leadership and which he headed until his death in 1898.

Vollrath invented "gray enameling" (which describes a particular method of manufacture, not a color).

Vollrath married Elizabeth Margaret Fuchs in 1847 and had six children. He was the father-in-law (twice) of Kohler Company founder John Michael Kohler and helped him get started in business. He was succeeded as president of The Vollrath Company by his son, Carl August Vollrath, grandson Jean C Vollrath (1894–1976), and great-grandson Walter Jodok Kohler Jr.

Two other sons, Jacob Vollrath Jr. (1894–1964) and Walter J. Vollrath Sr., (1897–1964) had served as officers of the Polar Ware Co., of Kiel, Wisconsin.

The Vollrath family which he founded was long prosperous and prominent in Sheboygan affairs.
