= Kohler Co. =

American manufacturing company in Wisconsin

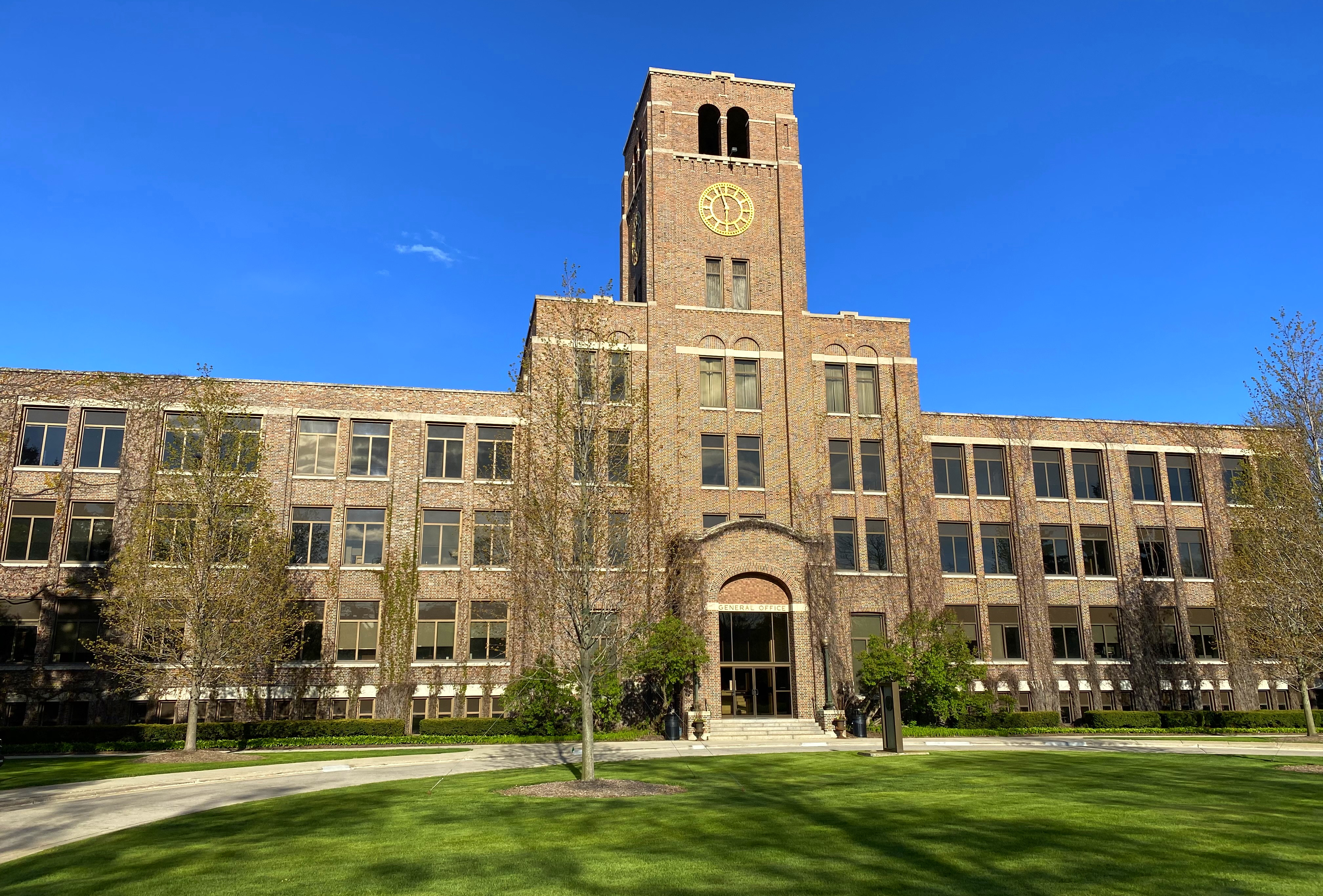
- Company headquarters in Kohler, Wisconsin
- Type: Private
- Industry: Manufacturing, hospitality
- Founded: December 6, 1873; 152 years ago
- Founder: John Michael Kohler
- Headquarters: 444 Highland Drive; Kohler, Wisconsin, U.S.
- Area served: Worldwide
- Key people: David Kohler (President and CEO)
- Products: Plumbing fixtures, tile, furniture and cabinetry, engines, generators
- Owner: Kohler family
- Number of employees: 40,000 (2019)
- Website: kohlercompany.com

Kohler Co., is an American manufacturing company founded in 1873 by John Michael Kohler, based in Kohler, Wisconsin. Kohler is best known for its plumbing products, but the company also manufactures furniture, cabinetry, tile, engines, and generators. Destination Kohler also owns various hospitality establishments in the United States and Scotland. In February 2017, Kohler Co. acquired UK-based Clarke Energy from the management team and ECI Partners, a multinational specialist in the engineering, construction, installation, and maintenance of engine-based power plants and an authorized distributor of GE's reciprocating engines in 19 countries worldwide. In November 2023, it was announced that Kohler is establishing the Energy group independently and would be bought in a complex partnership with private equity group Platinum Equity; the deal is slated to close in Q1 2024 and rebranded as Rehlko, an anagram of Kohler.

== History ==
Kohler Co. was co-founded in 1873 by Austrian immigrant John Michael Kohler and Charles Silberzahn with the purchase of the Sheboygan Union Iron and Steel Foundry from Kohler's father-in-law, Jacob Vollrath, for $5000. Early products included cast iron and steel farm implements, castings for furniture factories, and ornamental iron pieces including cemetery crosses and settees. A breakthrough came in 1883 when John Michael applied enamel to a cast-iron horse trough to create the company's first bathtub. The company has been primarily in the plumbing business ever since and is known for its plumbing fixtures and faucets.

In the early 20th century, Kohler made drinking fountains with a "bubbling valve", from which water shot vertically. Eventually, the entire fountain came to be known as a "bubbler" in the area in which Kohler products were sold. The term bubbler is still used in a few areas of Wisconsin and some other areas of the United States.

In 1934 and 1954, Kohler workers went on strike in what came to be known as the Kohler Strikes. A third strike took place in 1983 but lasted only a few weeks. On November 15, 2015, workers voted for the 2015 Kohler Strike, making it the fourth strike in the company's history.

In 1984 Kohler acquired Sterling Faucet Company. The company was renamed as Sterling Plumbing Group Inc. and the Sterling brand was integrated into the Kohler family of products. Kohler later expanded the offering of Sterling products adding to the faucet line, shower doors, sinks, toilets, and other bathroom accessories.

In 2007, Kohler created a joint venture in China called Kohler-YinXiang Ltd., based in Chongqing, China, to manufacture small gasoline engines. This joint venture filled a gap in Kohler's production capability and product portfolio, and allowed them to import small single cylinder engines. Kohler's UK subsidiary is the Cheltenham-based Kohler Mira Ltd, best known for manufacturing Mira Showers.

=== Corporate management history ===
Former Wisconsin Governor Walter J. Kohler Sr. was president of Kohler Co. and his son former Wisconsin Governor Walter J. Kohler Jr. served for many years in senior management. The presidency of Kohler was passed down from Herbert Kohler Jr. (born February 20, 1939, grandson of the founder), to his son, David Kohler, on June 1, 2015.

In 1998, Kohler made a plan to buy back any outstanding shares not owned by the family. All family members had to exchange their common shares for shares with limited rights that could not be sold. Since Kohler is not a publicly traded company, the number of shares floating was minimal. Kohler offered $55,400 per share, but some shareholders challenged this valuation and sued. The IRS also challenged this valuation by prosecuting the estate of Frederick Kohler, who had recently died holding 975 shares, but Kohler won the lawsuit.

== International outreach ==
Since 2021, Kohler products are distributed in Sri Lanka through the exclusive authorised distributor 'Gismo International', headquartered in Sri Jayawardenepura Kotte. The brand targets the premium segment of the bathroom fittings market, catering to hotels, resorts, apartments, houses, hospitals and numerous other institutions.

== Products ==
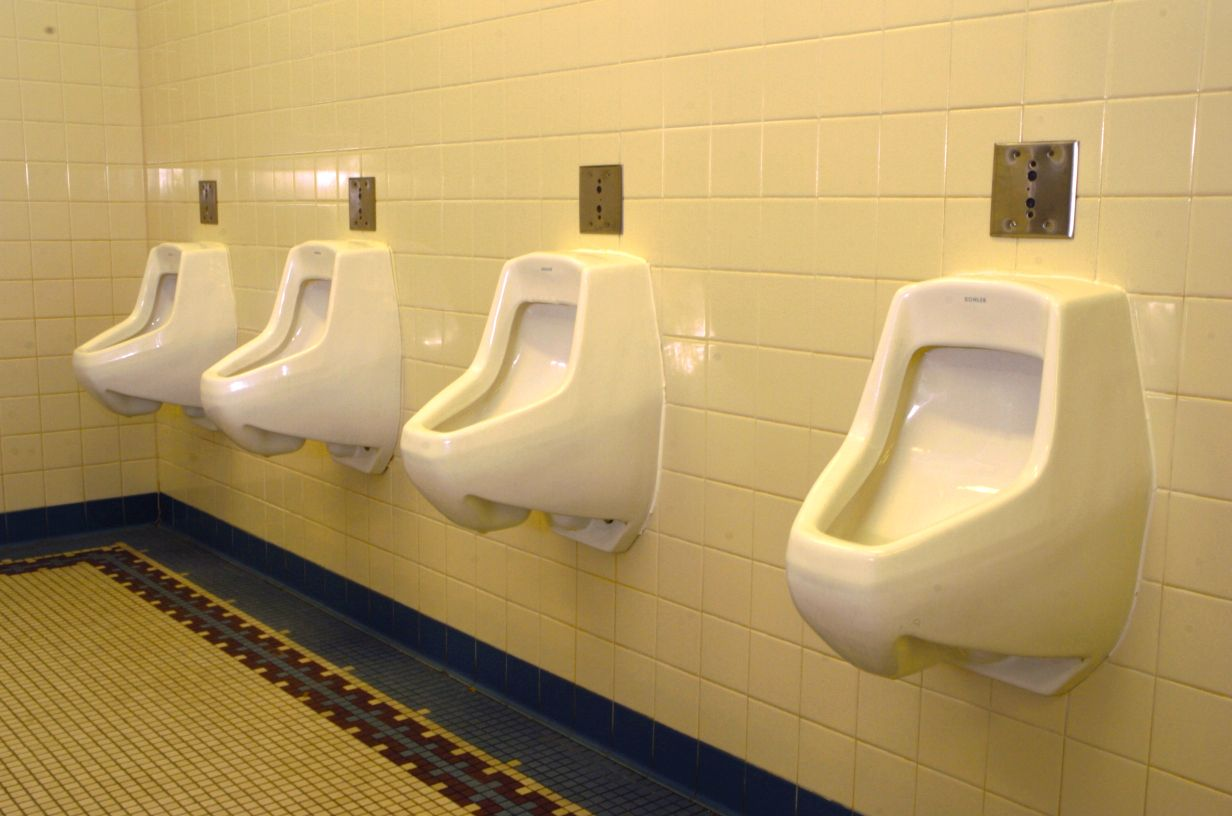
Kohler "Dexter" urinals

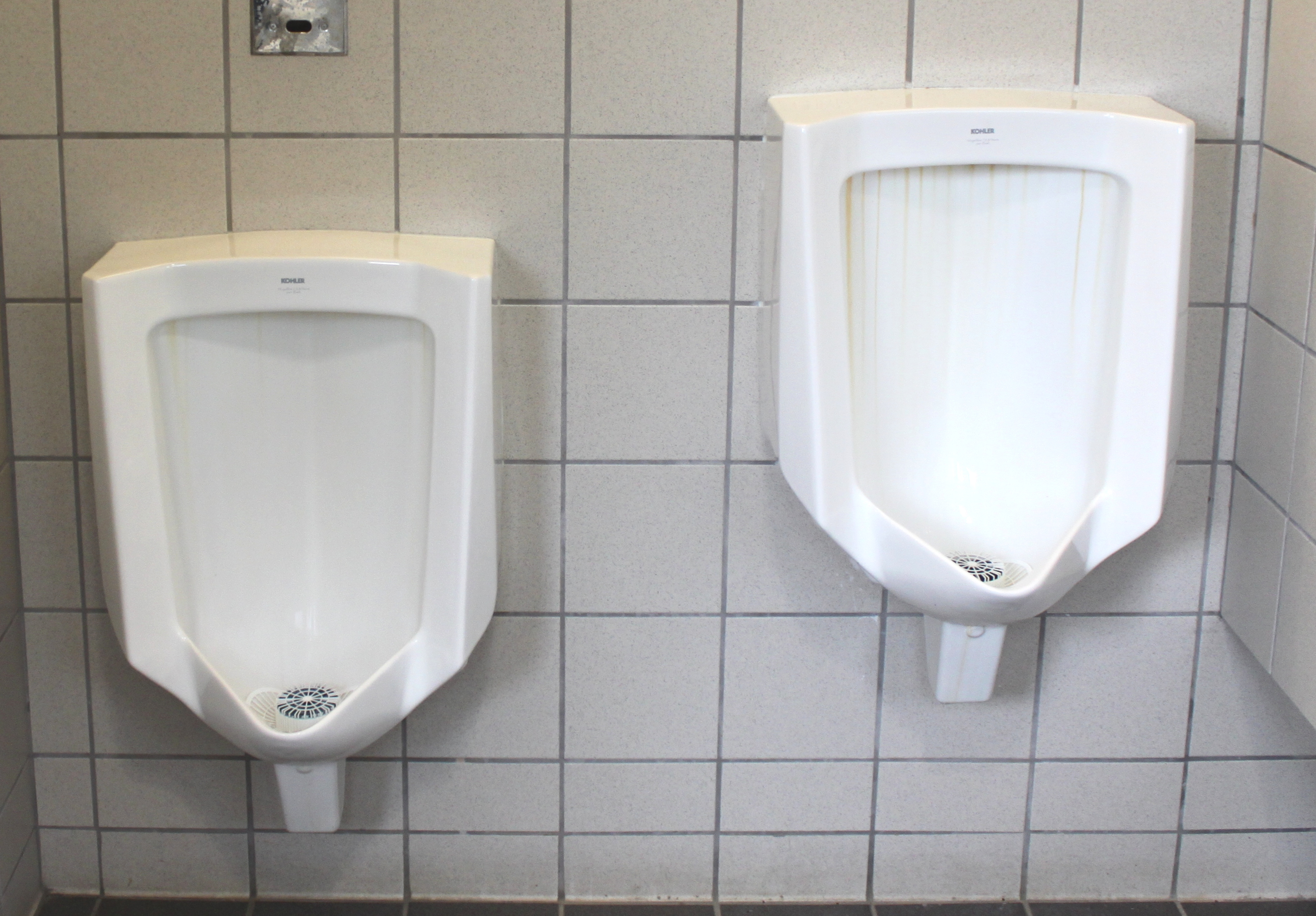
Kohler "Bardon" urinals

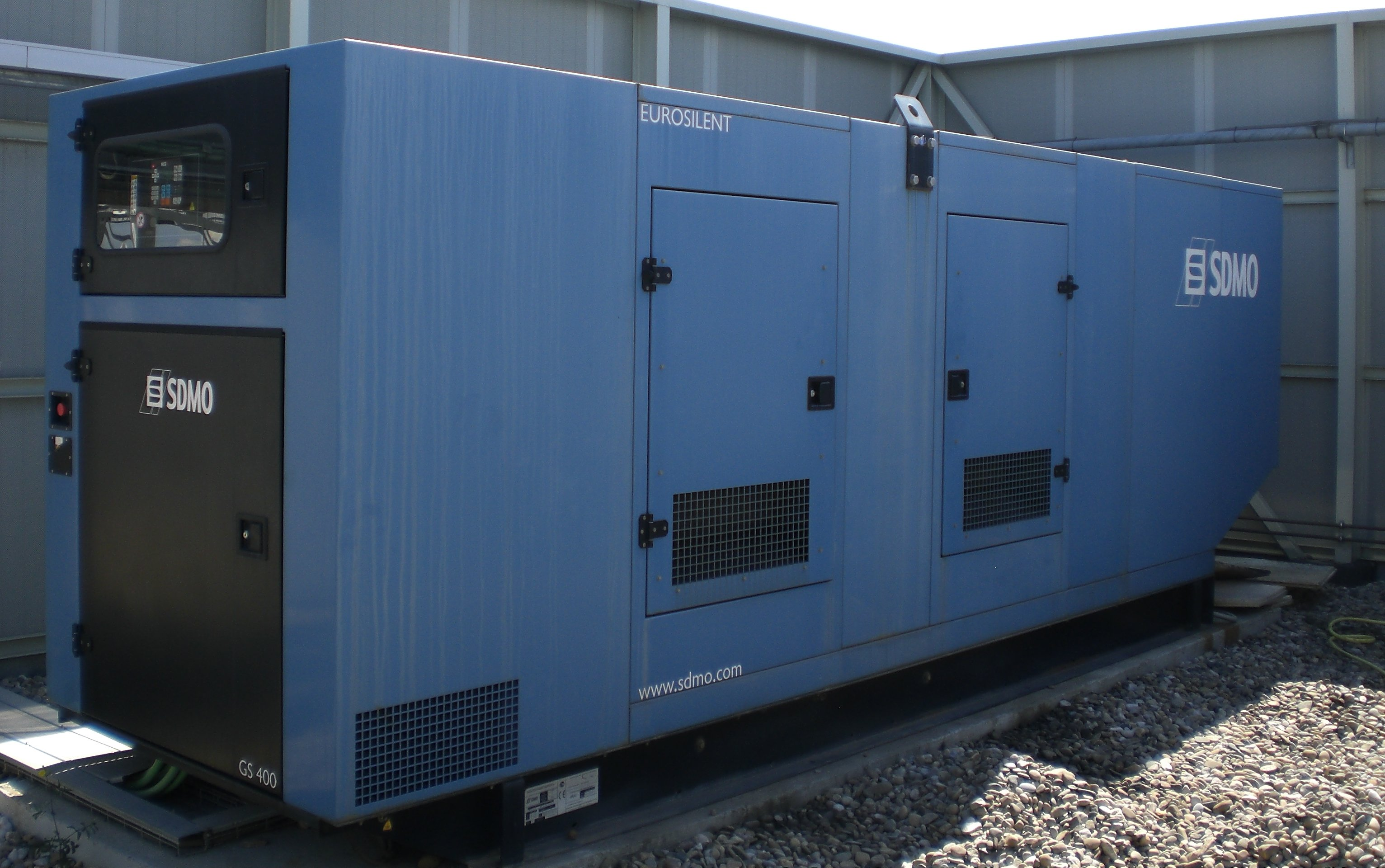
Power generator GS 400 produced by SDMO Industries

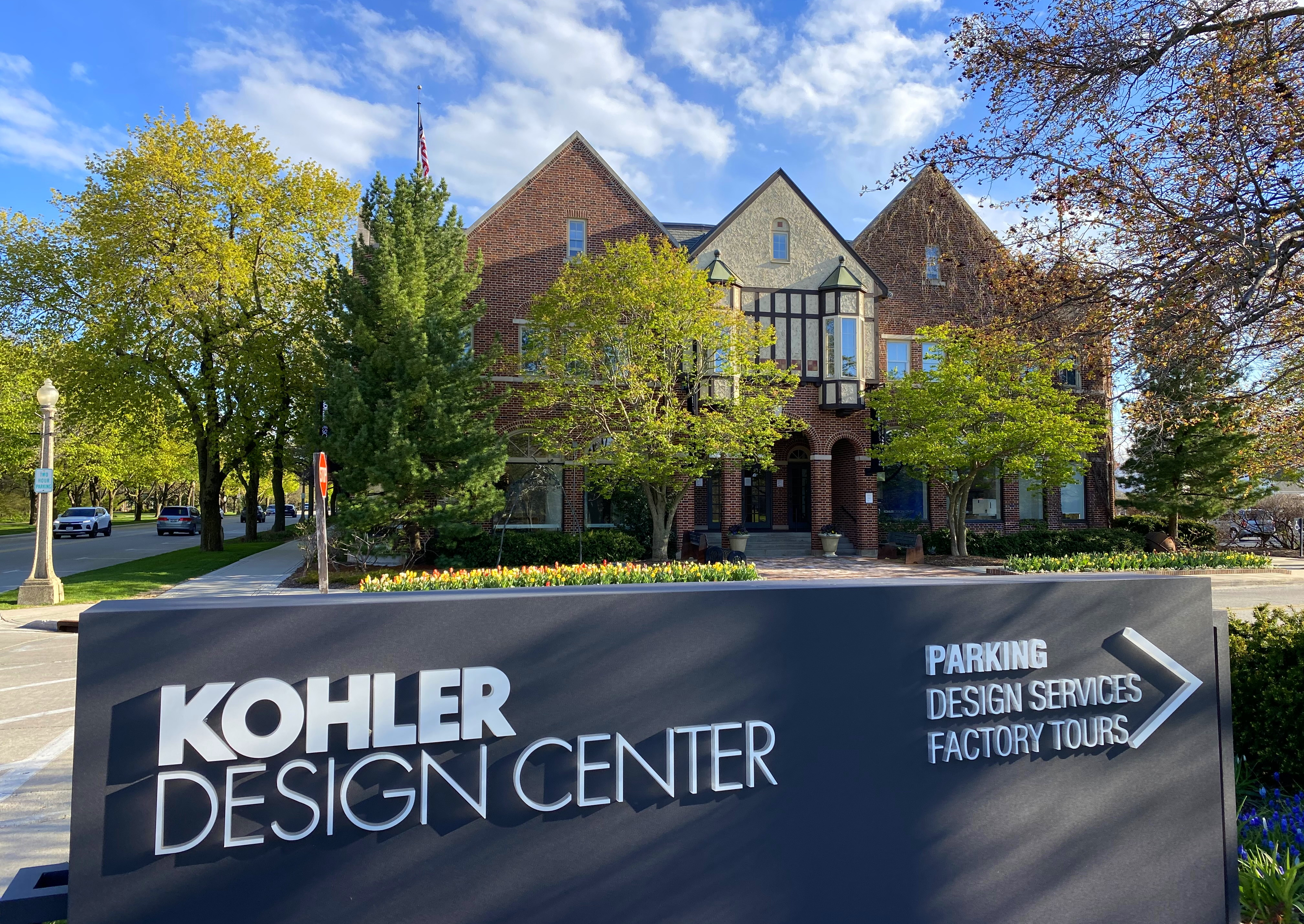
Kohler Design Center

Kohler's bath and kitchen fixtures are available in American hardware and home improvement stores and from Kohler Kitchen and Bath distributors. Kohler still makes traditional cast iron bathtubs, one of the few United States manufacturers to do so. Besides residential products, Kohler manufactures a commercial line of bathroom fixtures. The company also does artistic custom work, such as hand-painted sinks and toilets. In 2015 Kohler was named by Builder magazine as the "most used" and "best quality" in the "Bath Accessories" category as well as the top spot for "brand familiarity", "most used" and "quality rating" in the "Bath Fixtures" and "Whirlpool Baths" categories.

The Kohler Walk-In Bath Division designs, engineers, and builds accessible bathtubs that are easier to enter than traditional bathtub models. The division specializes in bathing products for people with limited mobility or who are disabled. Founded in 2015, this specialty division sells its bathtubs through independent dealers across the United States.

Kohler also makes a wide range of small industrial engines. Traditionally, the company manufactured gasoline engines; however, after purchasing the Italian company Lombardini, it extended its range and now offers diesel engines up to 134 HP. Kohler engines power a range of devices from water pumps to off-road vehicles. The Global Power group manufactures generators of varying sizes. Kohler was the first company to offer residential backup generators, starting in 1920.

Since 2007, the company has been expanding in the areas of furniture, cabinetry, and tile in the consumer market, and engines and generators for industry. The Kohler Interiors division of the company comprises Robern, Sprig, Kallista, Ann Sacks Tile and Kast.

Kohler displays many of its products at the Kohler Design Center in the village of Kohler.

At CES 2018 Kohler unveiled a new product line called Kohler Konnect, consisting of smart connected plumbing fixtures including bathtubs, mirrors, shower heads, toilets, and shower valves. These new digital fixtures have WiFi capabilities, enabling voice assistant control through Google Assistant, Amazon Alexa or Apple HomeKit, and app control support via the Kohler Konnect app. The Kohler Konnect services are powered by the Microsoft Azure Cloud platform. Competitors include the U by Moen shower controller and kitchen faucet, and the Delta VoiceIQ kitchen faucet.

== Sponsorships ==
In 2018, Kohler became a sponsor of English football giant Manchester United. As the club's first sleeve sponsor from 2018 to 2022, Kohler had its logo prominently displayed on all United jerseys. While the company was replaced by fellow American company DXC Technology as sleeve sponsor in 2022, it remains an official United partner.

In early 2021, Kohler announced they would be sponsoring Roush Fenway Racing driver Ryan Newman for a selected number of races in 2021, debuting in the 2021 Daytona 500, while using Kohler Generators as their sponsor. They continued their sponsorship in 2022 with driver Brad Keselowski, who left Team Penske at the end of 2021 to join Roush as a driver/minority co-owner under the team rebranded Roush Fenway Keselowski Racing, or RFK Racing in 2022. They did not return to sponsor the team in 2023.

== Destination Kohler ==
Kohler Co.'s hospitality and real estate group, Destination Kohler, oversees the management, marketing and tourism promotion for its golf courses, hotels, private clubs, shops, restaurants, company-sponsored and village events. The American Club is a highly rated resort hotel in the Midwest.

== John Michael Kohler Arts Center ==
Kohler Co. is affiliated with the non-profit John Michael Kohler Arts Center in Sheboygan, Wisconsin, which occupies a square block of downtown Sheboygan that contains Kohler's restored former mansion, several newer buildings, and the exterior structure of the former Carnegie-era Mead Public Library building as a modern "ruin". The John Michael Kohler Arts Center operates an Arts/Industry program, the primary component of which is a residency program at Kohler. Artists have the opportunity to spend two to six months creating works of art using the industrial materials and equipment.

== Residential review committee ==
The company continues to maintain a residential review committee (similar to a homeowner association) which ensures the compliance of the original Kohler Village plans and architectural designs from the defunct Kohler Improvement Company. Residents who want to add onto their home, build new outbuildings or fences must receive Kohler Company RRC approval before taking their plans to the planning commission, and comply with the design and aesthetic standards of the Kohler Company RRC.

== Controversies ==
In 1999, a court case was brought by the United States Department of Labor alleging that Kohler Co.'s hiring practices were discriminatory to women. The company had an informal height requirement of 5 ft 4 in (1.63 m) for women, which is the average adult female height in the United States. Because of its contracts with the federal government, the company was prohibited from enforcing this requirement and as part of a settlement agreed to hire 111 of the 2,000 women who had applied to work at Kohler from 1994 to 1995 and to undertake a study "to eliminate unnecessary barriers to women".

In 2005, China Labor Watch accused Kohler China (Investment) Co., Ltd. of major worker rights violations at its Foshan factory. These included: excessive work hours, lack of overtime pay, low wage payment, unsafe working conditions, uncompensated work injuries, and denying workers the ability to form their own union.

In January 2020, Kohler paid $20 million in a settlement with the United States Department of Justice, the Environmental Protection Agency, and the state of California over its small engines' violations of the Clean Air Act and California law.

== See also ==
- American Standard Brands – Plumbing fixtures company
- Delta Faucet Company – Plumbing fixtures company
- Moen Incorporated – American plumbing fixtures company
- Pfister – Plumbing fixtures company
- Toto Ltd. – Japanese plumbing fixtures and semiconductor company

== Images ==
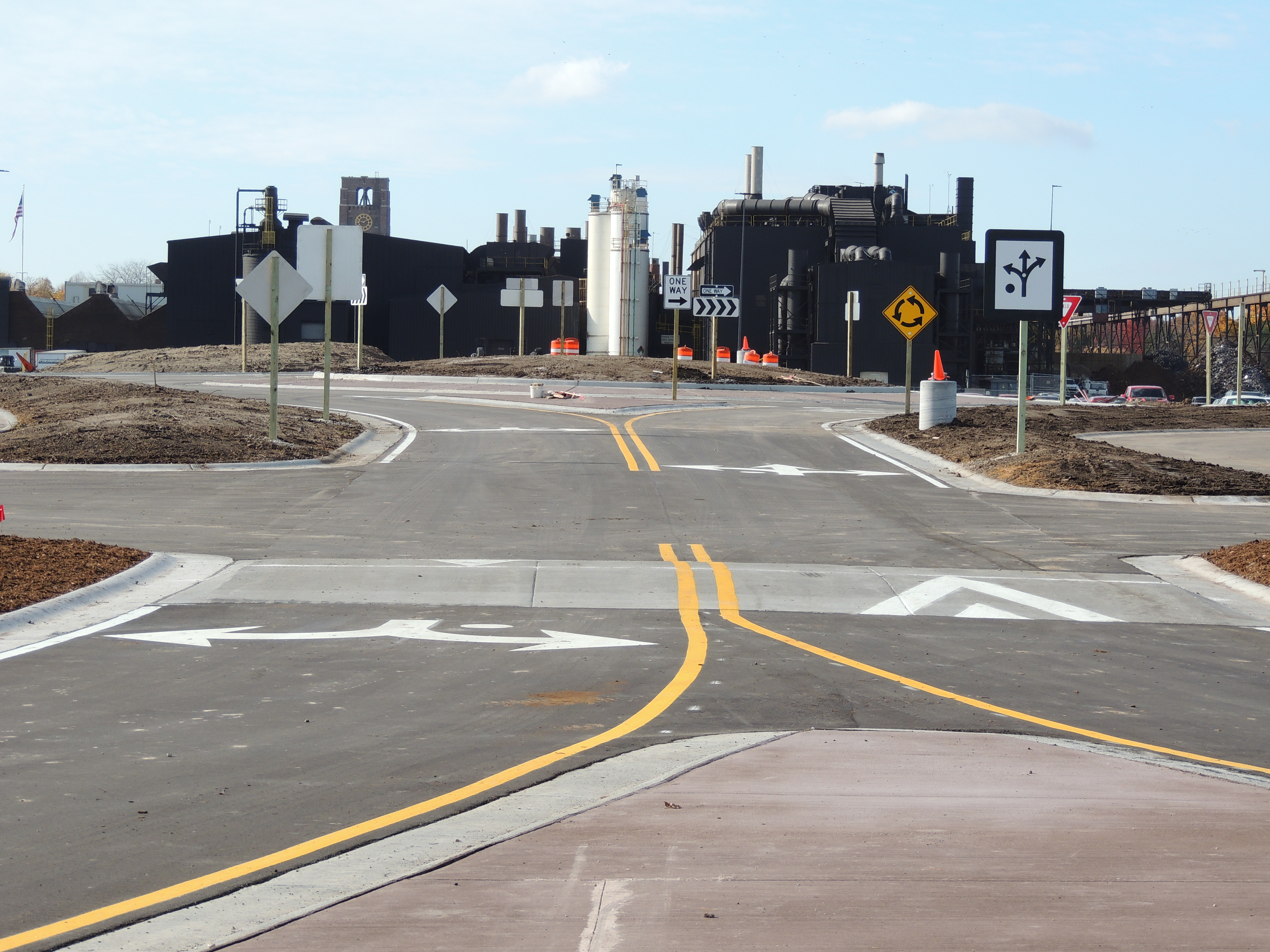
Kohler Company Foundry as seen from the east

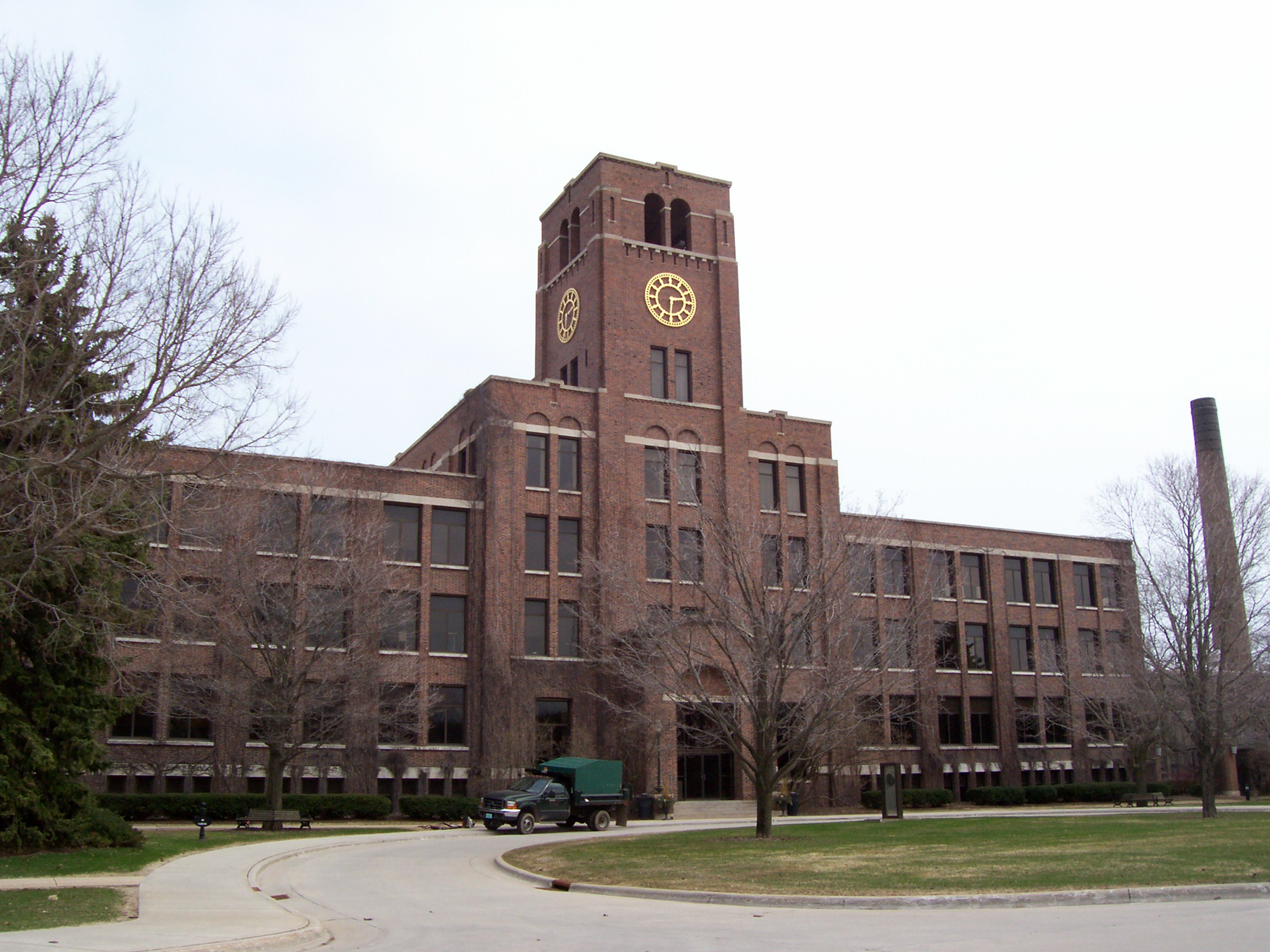
Kohler Company Main Office in April 2008

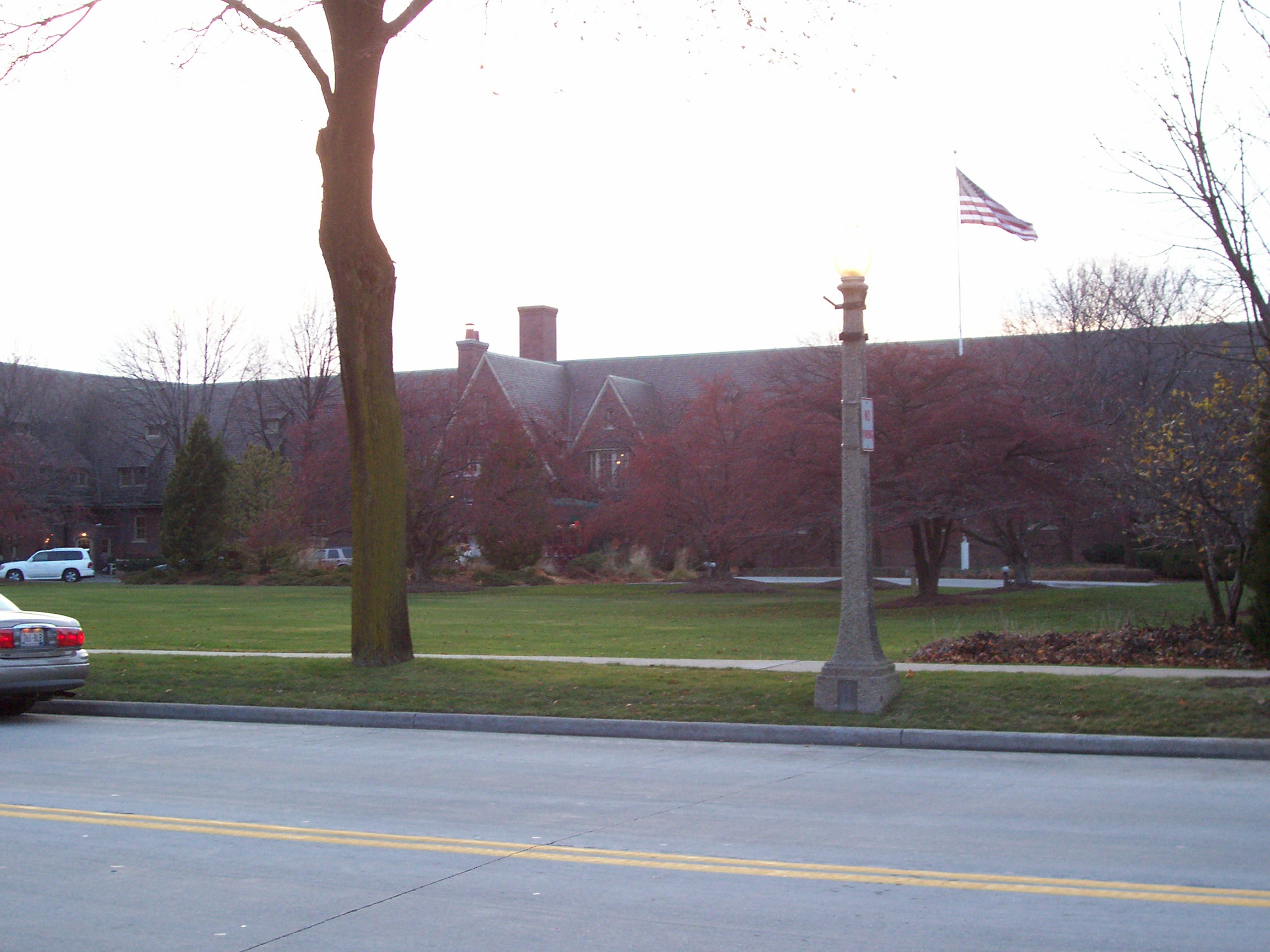
The American Club

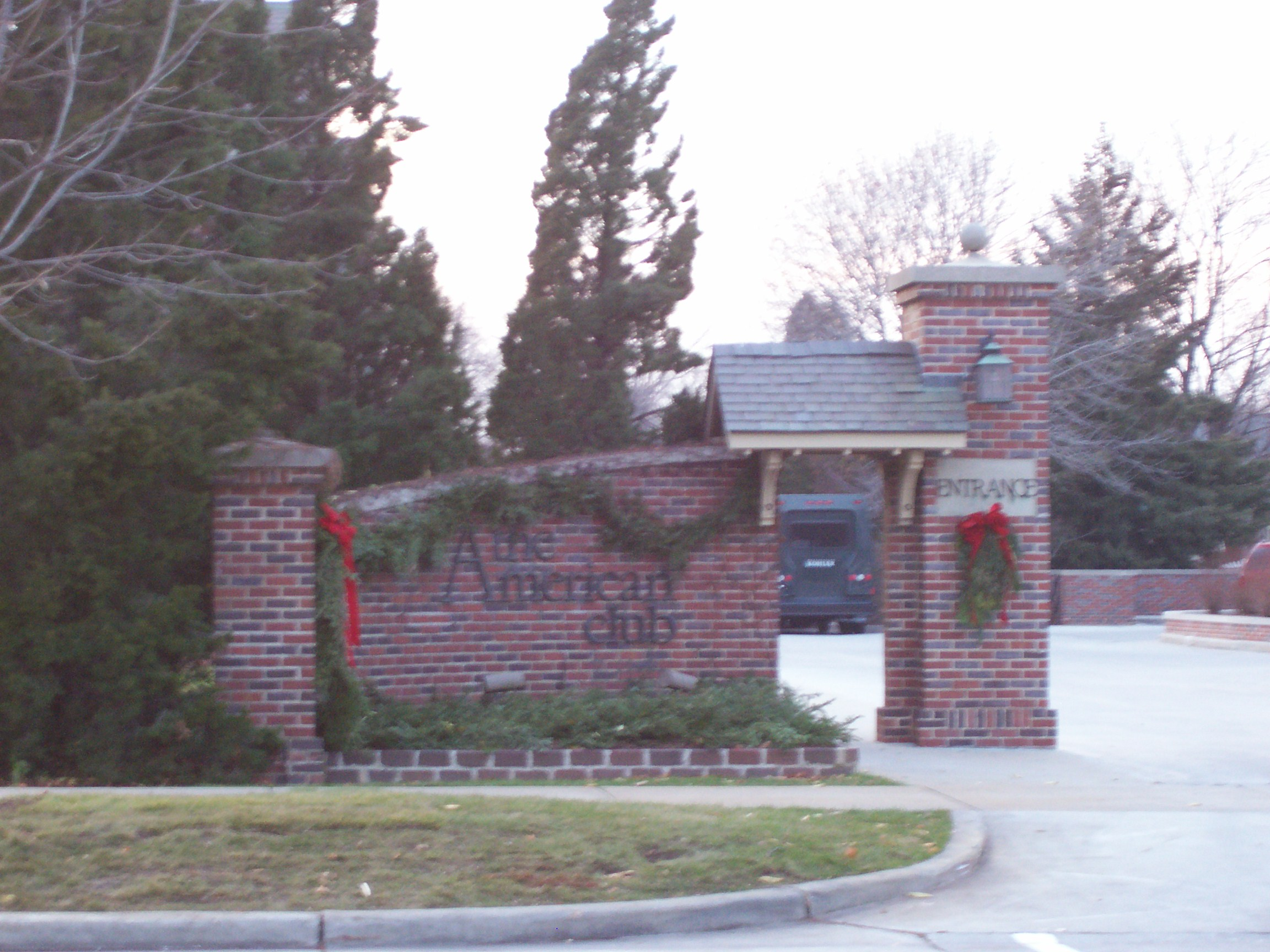
Entrance to The American Club
