= Herbert Kohler Jr. =

American businessman (1939–2022)

- Born: Herbert Vollrath Kohler Jr; February 20, 1939; Chicago, Illinois, US
- Died: September 3, 2022 (aged 83); Kohler, Wisconsin, US
- Education: The Choate School; Yale University
- Occupations: Executive chairman, Kohler Company
- Spouses: Linda Karger (m. 1961, divorced): Natalie Black
- Children: 3, including David
- Parent(s): Ruth DeYoung Kohler; Herbert Vollrath Kohler Sr.
- Relatives: Mark Hoplamazian (son-in-law)

Herbert Vollrath Kohler Jr. (February 20, 1939 – September 3, 2022) was an American billionaire businessman, a member of the Kohler family of Wisconsin, and the executive chairman of the Kohler Company, a manufacturing and hospitality company in Kohler, Wisconsin, best known for its plumbing products, golf courses, and resorts, with the latter two fields of business directly entered into under his chairmanship. Before his death, Forbes estimated the net worth of him and his family at US$8.8 billion.

== Early life and education ==
Kohler was born February 20, 1939, to Ruth DeYoung Kohler and Herbert Vollrath Kohler Sr., who ran the Kohler Company from 1937 until his death. He is related to other former company presidents, including Walter J. Kohler Sr. and Walter J. Kohler Jr. He graduated from The Choate School in 1957 and chaired the school's board of trustees from 2005 to 2010. He graduated in 1965 from Yale University with a degree in Industrial Administration and went to work for the company. In June 1972, he was elected chairman of the board and chief executive officer at the age of 33.

== Business career ==
As a teenager, Kohler worked as a laborer or technician for every division of Kohler Co., which specialised in manufacturing plumbing products. He was awarded a bachelor's degree in industrial administration in 1965 by Yale University. After graduation, he joined the Kohler Company full-time and, in 1972, was appointed chief executive officer.

The National Kitchen and Bath Hall of Fame inducted Kohler in its founding year of 1989, followed by the National Housing Hall of Fame in 1993. Junior Achievement inducted him into its U.S. Business Hall of Fame in 2006. Kohler has also received the "Legend in Leadership Award" from the Chief Executive Leadership Institute of the Yale School of Management. As of 2021, Kohler's net worth was $9.8 billion.

In April 2015, the company announced Kohler was stepping down as CEO and relinquishing the title to his son, David Kohler, while remaining executive chairman.

=== Golf ===
Kohler was a golf fan, and the Kohler Company owns and operates four courses designed by Pete Dye. The first course was constructed at Blackwolf Run, Wisconsin, in 1988. A second 18-hole course was added to the site in 1990 and hosted the 1998 U.S. Women's Open. In 1998, Kohler added 36 holes at Whistling Straits, also in Wisconsin, which has hosted the PGA Championship in 2004, 2010 and 2015, the U.S. Senior Open in 2007, and the Ryder Cup in 2021.

In 2009, Kohler purchased "one of the sport's most famous buildings", Hamilton Hall, now known as the Hamilton Grand, a collection of 26 luxury apartments. Kohler also owned the Old Course Hotel in St Andrews, Scotland.

=== Kohler Environmental Center ===
In 2012, the Kohler Environmental Center (KEC) at Choate Rosemary Hall was inaugurated. The building was named after Herbert Kohler, who donated the $20 million required to build it. It has an area of 32,000 square feet (3,000 m^{2}) and is designed to have a low environmental impact, using features such as solar panels, composting, and a greenhouse heated with used cooking oil. The KEC is situated on a 266 acres (108 ha) plot of forest and wetlands, which can be incorporated into classes focused on the environment.

== Personal life ==
Graves of Herbert and Natalie Black Kohler at Woodland Kohler Village Cemetery

In 1961, Kohler married Linda Karger, but the couple divorced in the early 1980s. They had three children together. Their daughter, Rachel Kohler, is married to Mark Hoplamazian, CEO of Hyatt, since 2006. In 1985, Linda married Roger Anderson, retired chairman and CEO of Continental Illinois.

Kohler appeared in the film Open Range, which starred and was directed by his friend Kevin Costner.

His second wife was Natalie Black, a Stanford University graduate who joined Kohler in 1985 as a lawyer, rising to general counsel and senior vice president of communications. She is now head of the Kohler Foundation.

Kohler owned a breeding facility where he bred many Morgan horses. He owned the Morgan horse Noble Flaire from 1984 until it died in 2006.

He died on September 3, 2022, in Kohler, Wisconsin, at the age of 83, and was buried at Woodland Kohler Village Cemetery.

== See also ==
- Mount Kohler, named after Kohler and his sister, Ruth DeYoung Kohler II in Antarctica
