= Kohler, Wisconsin =

- Village
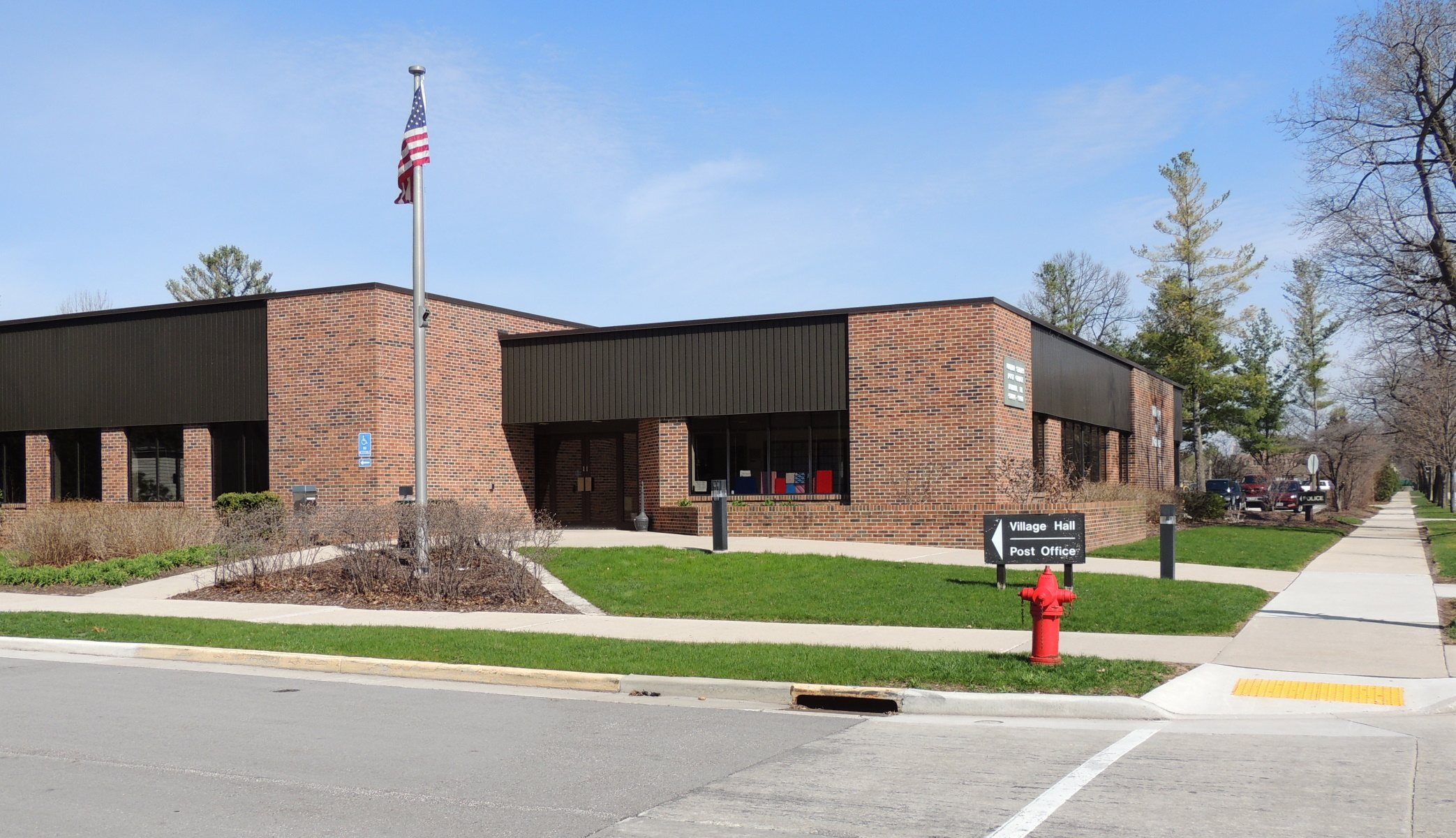
- Village hall

- Location of Kohler in Sheboygan County, Wisconsin.
- Coordinates: 43°44′18″N 87°46′52″W
- Country: United States
- State: Wisconsin
- County: Sheboygan

Area
  - Total: 5.53 sq mi (14.33 km^{2})
  - Land: 5.32 sq mi (13.77 km^{2})
  - Water: 0.22 sq mi (0.56 km^{2})
- Elevation: 686 ft (209 m)

Population (2020)
  - Total: 2,195
  - Density: 412.7/sq mi (159.36/km^{2})
- Time zone: UTC-6 (Central (CST))
  - Summer (DST): UTC-5 (CDT)
- Postal code: 53044
- Area code: 920
- FIPS code: 55-40275
- GNIS feature ID: 1567601
- Website: kohlervillagewi.gov

Kohler is a village in Sheboygan County, Wisconsin, United States, along the Sheboygan River. The population was 2,195 at the 2020 census. It is included in the Sheboygan metropolitan statistical area.

== History ==
Originally called Riverside within the rural Town of Sheboygan, the village was founded as a model company town in 1900 when the Kohler Company built a new plant at the location. The village was incorporated in 1912 as the Village of Kohler. Of the original homes, most built between 1917 and 1931, approximately 95% are owner occupied. The Kohler Company continues to retain final authority over the design of home and business additions, outbuildings and fences in the village to keep them within a certain aesthetic standard.

In 1900, Kohler Company moved four miles westward from Sheboygan to its present location, then known as Riverside. Chief executive Walter J. Kohler Sr. hoped to establish "a fine American city with opportunity for home ownership in agreeable surroundings, all tending toward a rational home life." He traveled to Europe in 1913, studying the Krupp Steel Works's communities and conferring in England with "garden city" urban planner Sir Ebenezer Howard. Kohler's planning, starting in 1917, including engaging the Olmsted Brothers landscape architectural firm.

In 1931, The New York Times described Kohler Village as "That ideal long sought—industry surrounded by rich community life—seems to have found fulfillment in the town of Kohler. Among all other towns it stands apart, a compact manufacturing centre in the midst of garden homes, a manufacturing plant without a visible ash heap."

In 1934, 1954–1965, 1983, and 2015, the United Auto Workers and other unions have gone on strike against the Kohler Company, causing limited to major disruptions to village operations.

== Geography ==
Kohler is located at 43°44′18″N 87°46′52″W (43.738244, -87.781109).

According to the United States Census Bureau, the village has a total area of 5.63 square miles (14.58 km^{2}), of which 5.41 square miles (14.01 km^{2}) is land and 0.22 square miles (0.57 km^{2}) is water.

== Demographics ==
Historical population
Census	Pop.	Note	%±
1920	403		—
1930	1,748		333.7%
1940	1,789		2.3%
1950	1,716		−4.1%
1960	1,524		−11.2%
1970	1,738		14.0%
1980	1,651		−5.0%
1990	1,817		10.1%
2000	1,926		6.0%
2010	2,120		10.1%
2020	2,195		3.5%
U.S. Decennial Census

=== 2020 census ===
Kohler village, Wisconsin – Racial and ethnic composition Note: the US Census treats Hispanic/Latino as an ethnic category. This table excludes Latinos from the racial categories and assigns them to a separate category. Hispanics/Latinos may be of any race.
Race / Ethnicity (NH = Non-Hispanic)	Pop 2000	Pop 2010	Pop 2020	% 2000	% 2010	% 2020
White alone (NH)	1,863	1,999	1,945	96.73%	94.29%	88.61%
Black or African American alone (NH)	1	3	8	0.05%	0.14%	0.36%
Native American or Alaska Native alone (NH)	0	0	1	0.00%	0.00%	0.05%
Asian alone (NH)	37	52	113	1.92%	2.45%	5.15%
Native Hawaiian or Pacific Islander alone (NH)	1	0	0	0.05%	0.00%	0.00%
Other race alone (NH)	0	0	9	0.00%	0.00%	0.41%
Mixed race or Multiracial (NH)	8	17	68	0.42%	0.80%	3.10%
Hispanic or Latino (any race)	16	49	51	0.83%	2.31%	2.32%
Total	1,926	2,120	2,195	100.00%	100.00%	100.00%

=== 2010 census ===
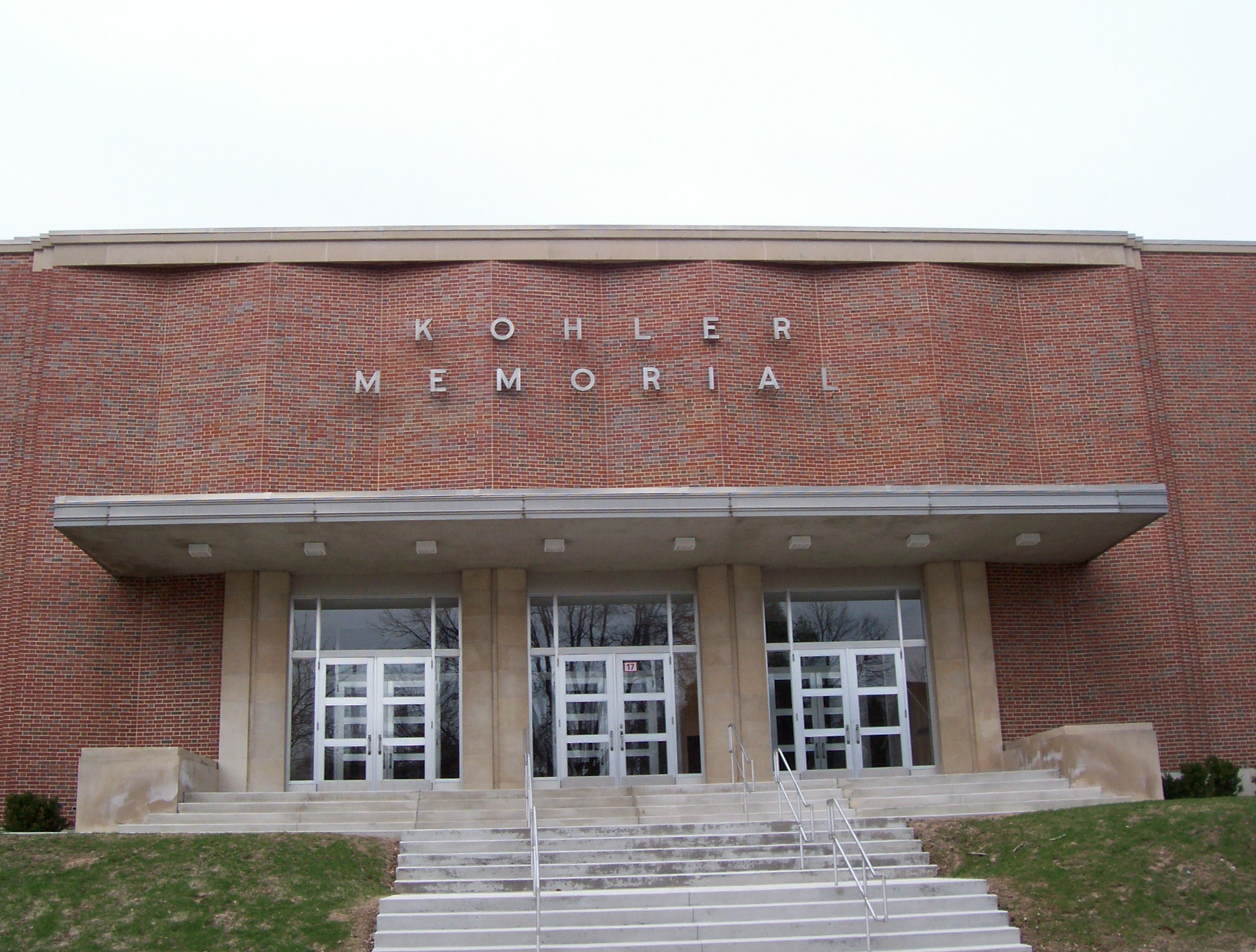
Kohler Memorial Theatre

As of the 2010 census, there were 2,120 people, 784 households, and 608 families residing in the village. The population density was 391.9 inhabitants per square mile (151.3/km^{2}). There were 871 housing units at an average density of 161.0 per square mile (62.2/km^{2}). The racial makeup of the village was 96.0% White, 0.2% African American, 2.5% Asian, 0.2% from other races, and 1.1% from two or more races. Hispanic or Latino of any race were 2.3% of the population.

There were 784 households, of which 38.6% had children under the age of 18 living with them, 68.9% were married couples living together, 6.6% had a female householder with no husband present, 2.0% had a male householder with no wife present, and 22.4% were non-families. 19.0% of all households were made up of individuals, and 9.8% had someone living alone who was 65 years of age or older. The average household size was 2.70 and the average family size was 3.12.

The median age in the village was 42 years. 30.5% of residents were under the age of 18; 3.2% were between the ages of 18 and 24; 22% were from 25 to 44; 29.4% were from 45 to 64; and 15% were 65 years of age or older. The gender makeup of the village was 47.2% male and 52.8% female.

=== 2000 census ===
The population density was 354.0 people per square mile (136.7/km^{2}). There were 792 housing units at an average density of 145.6 per square mile (56.2/km^{2}).

There were 568 families and 737 households, out of which 38.7% had children under the age of 18 living with them, 71.4% were married couples living together, 3.9% had a female householder with no husband present, and 22.9% were non-families. 21.0% of all households were made up of individuals, and 10.3% had someone living alone who was 65 years of age or older. The average household size was 2.61 and the average family size was 3.06.

In the village, the population was spread out, with 28.8% under the age of 18, 3.3% from 18 to 24, 27.5% from 25 to 44, 27.9% from 45 to 64, and 12.5% who were 65 years of age or older. The median age was 40 years. For every 100 females, there were 92.2 males. For every 100 females age 18 and over, there were 93.0 males.

The median income for a household in the village was $75,000, and the median income for a family was $86,123. Males had a median income of $53,839 versus $32,188 for females. The per capita income for the village was $39,355. About 2.6% of families and 2.8% of the population were below the poverty line, including 3.4% of those under age 18 and 3.9% of those age 65 or over.

== Businesses ==
As a company town, the Kohler Company, a leading plumbing and small engine company, is the village's largest employer. Kohler's hospitality division along with its residential real estate and retail arms make up the largest goods and services employer of the village.

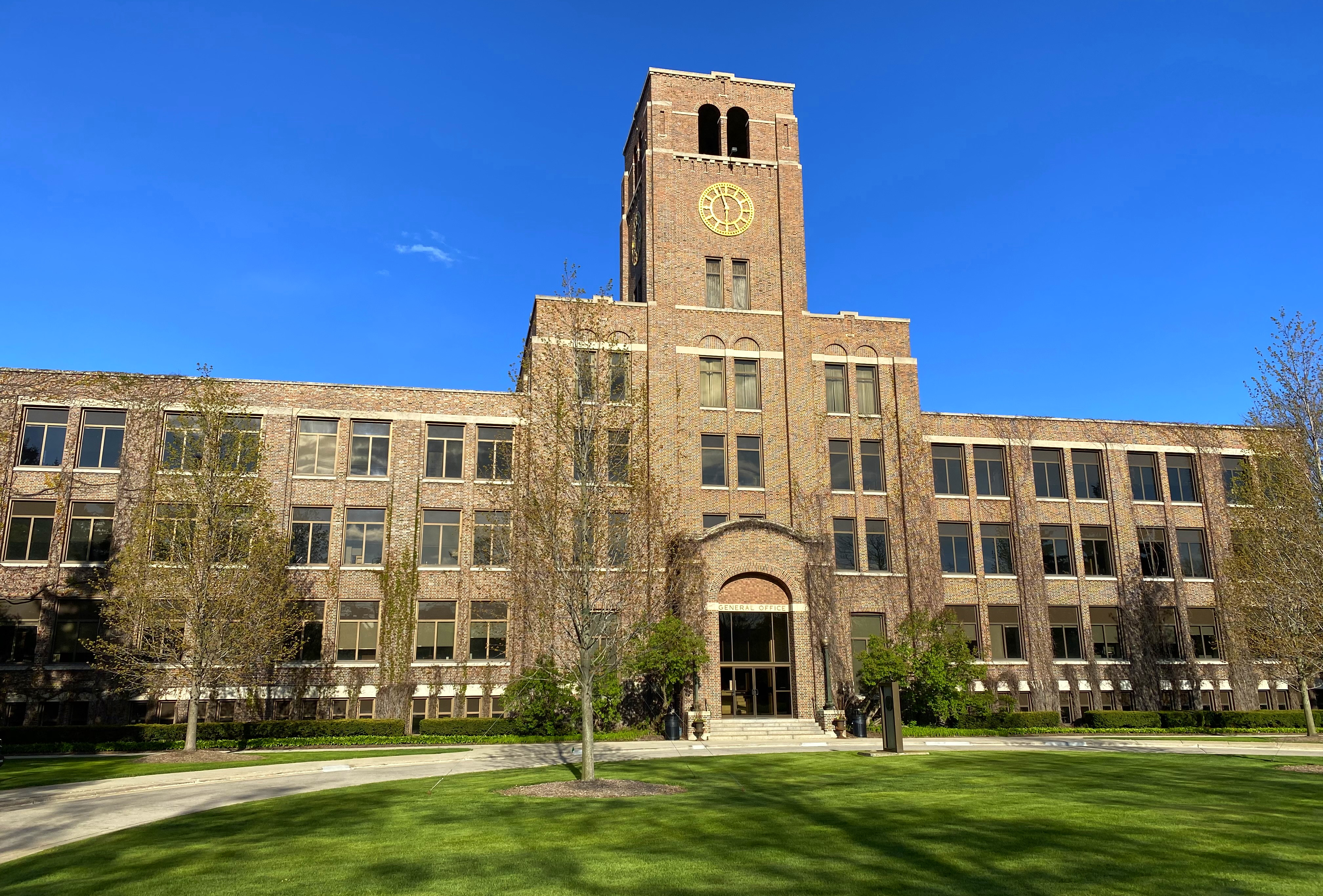
Kohler Company Main Office

Kohler has two major shopping areas: the Shops at Woodlake Kohler just north of the village's downtown, and Deertrace on the extreme southeast side of the village at the intersection of WI 28 and Washington Avenue.

In July 2022, Aurora Health Care opened Aurora Medical Center Sheboygan County, which replaced the 89-year-old Aurora Sheboygan Memorial Medical Center. It is located on Union Avenue east of Interstate 43 on Kohler village land north of the Acuity Insurance campus. The land itself is otherwise inaccessible from Kohler proper itself without going through Sheboygan.

== Gallery ==
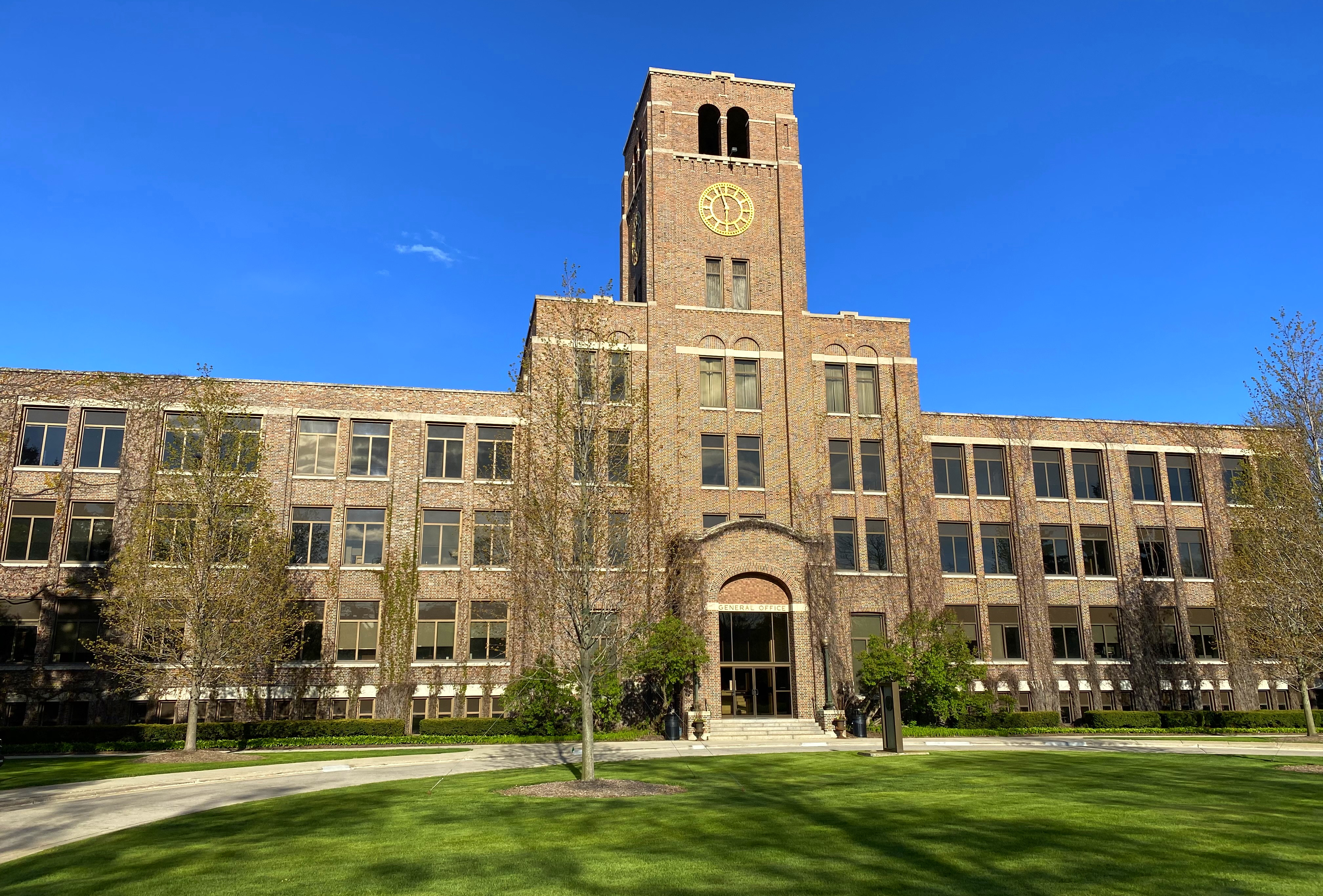
Kohler Company Main Office

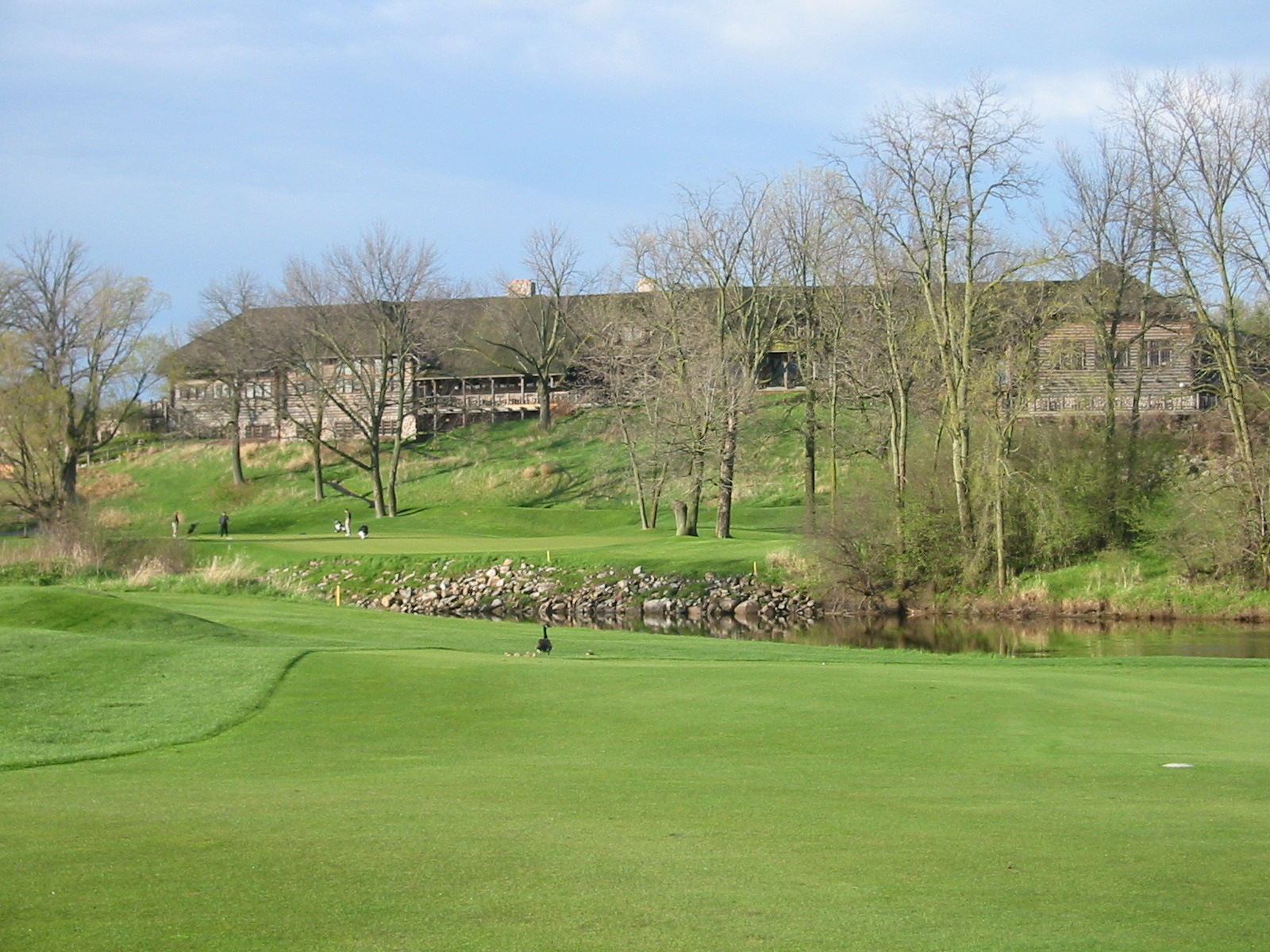
Blackwolf Run Club House

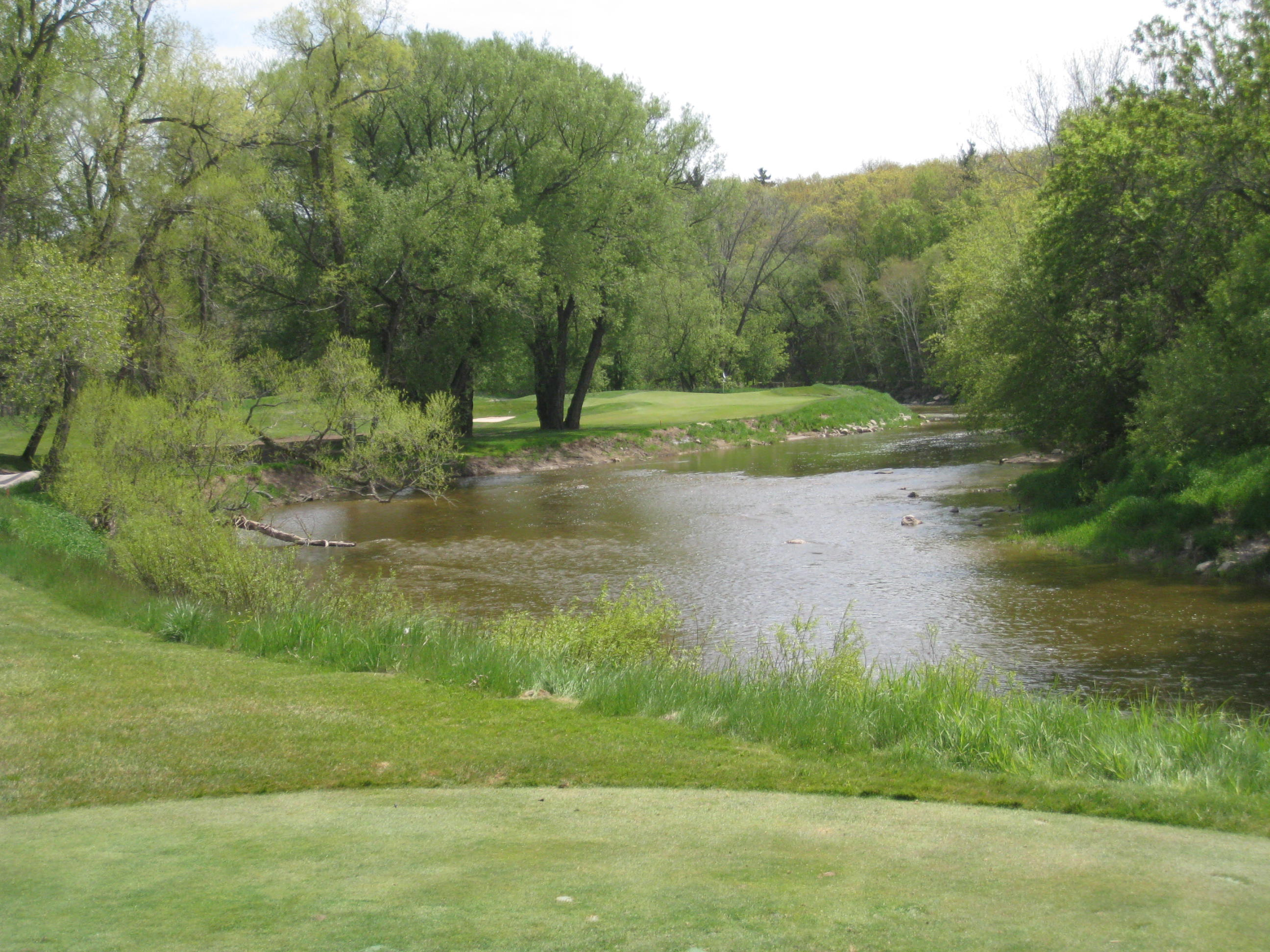
Blackwolf Run

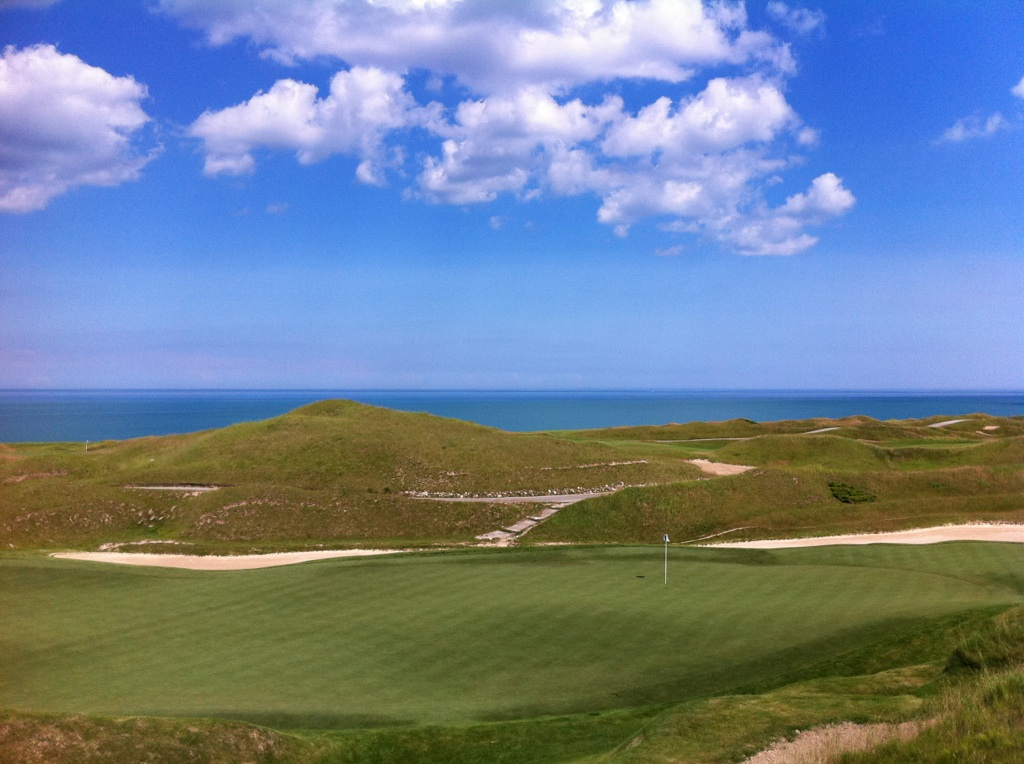
Whistling Straits

== Notable people ==
- Jake Dickert, football coach
- Walter Ireland, member of Wisconsin State Assembly and businessman
- David Kohler, president and chief executive officer, Kohler Company
- Herbert Kohler Jr., industrialist
- John Michael Kohler, founder of Kohler Company, industrialist, philanthropist
- Walter J. Kohler Sr., politician and industrialist, 26th Governor of Wisconsin
- Walter J. Kohler Jr., politician and industrialist, 33rd Governor of Wisconsin
- David Leitch, Hollywood stuntman and film director
- Joe Wolf, retired NBA player

== See also ==
- List of villages in Wisconsin
