= List of companies based in New York (state) =

The following list of New York companies includes notable companies that are, or once were, headquartered in New York.

== Companies based in New York ==
=== 0–9 ===
- 10x Management
- 1-800-Flowers

=== A ===
- Abel Honor New York
- AEC Daily Corporation
- AERCO International
- Aéropostale
- Ambac
- American Broadcasting Company
- American Express
- AIG
- Ann Inc.
- AOL
- APriori Capital Partners
- Arizona Beverage Company
- Associated Supermarkets
- Assurant
- Atlas Air

=== B ===
- B&H Photo
- The Bank of New York Mellon
- Barnes & Noble
- BlackRock
- Bloomberg L.P.
- Bowery Farming
- Bristol-Myers Squibb
- Brooks Brothers
- Bulova

=== C ===
- CA Technologies
- Calvin Klein
- Carlisle Collection
- Carrols Restaurant Group
- Caxton Associates
- Citigroup
- Coach New York
- Cole Haan
- Colgate-Palmolive
- Cohen's Fashion Optical
- Colonial Media and Entertainment
- College Daily
- CPI Aerostructures
- The Compleat Sculptor
- Consolidated Edison
- Constellation Brands
- ContiGroup Companies
- Corning Inc.

=== D ===
- D'Agostino Supermarkets
- D. E. Shaw & Co.
- DeBeer Lacrosse
- Depository Trust & Clearing Corporation
- DKNY
- DLJ Merchant Banking Partners
- Dorm Company Corporation
- Dow Jones & Company
- Duane Reade
- Dylan's Candy Bar

=== E ===
- Energy Brands
- E.W. Holbrook & Company

=== F ===
- Firstrade Securities
- Foot Locker
- Fox Corporation
- FreshDirect
- The Frye Company
- FuboTV
- FUBU

=== G ===
- GAMCO Investors
- General Maritime Corporation
- GoldenSource
- Goldman Sachs
- Griffon Corporation
- The Guardian Life Insurance Company of America

=== H ===
- Hain Celestial Group
- Harman Kardon
- Hauppauge Computer Works
- Henry Schein
- Hess Corporation
- Honeysuckle Media
- HRG Group
- HSBC Bank USA

=== I ===
- IAC
- IBM
- Iconix Brand Group
- Icahn Enterprises
- Innovate Corp.
- Insurial
- The Interpublic Group of Companies
- IPIX
- ITerating
- ITT Inc.
- Izzy Gold Records

=== J ===
- J.Crew
- JPMorgan Chase
- J. Press
- Jarden
- Jefferies Group
- JetBlue
- Jingle Punks Music

=== K ===
- Kate Spade & Company
- Kennedy Fried Chicken
- Kenneth Cole Productions
- Key Food
- Kimber Manufacturing
- King Kullen
- Kingstone Companies
- Kodak
- Krinos Foods

=== L ===
- Lillian Vernon
- Loews Corporation
- Logicworks
- Lowy Frame and Restoring Company

=== M ===
- M&T Bank
- Macy's
- MapEasy
- Marsh McLennan
- Marshall Farms
- Martha Stewart Living Omnimedia
- Marvel Entertainment
- Mastercard
- MBIA
- McGraw-Hill Education
- Mediacom
- Merrill Lynch
- MetLife
- Mighty Taco
- Moody's Ratings
- Morgan Stanley
- Mrs. John L. Strong
- MSCI

=== N ===
- NASDAQ
- Nathan's Famous
- National Fuel Gas
- NBCUniversal
- NBT Bank
- NBTY
- NEON Communications Group, Inc.
- New Era Cap Company
- New York & Company
- New York Community Bank
- New York Life Insurance Company
- New York Stock Exchange
- The New York Times Company
- News Corp
- Nine West Holdings
- NOCO Energy Corporation

=== O ===
- OMD Worldwide
- Omnicom Group
- Optimum Communications
- Orange County Choppers
- Operative Media
- Outgrow.me

=== P ===
- Pall Corporation
- Parsons Brinckerhoff
- Partners and Napier
- Paychex
- PepsiCo
- Pfizer
- Phat Farm
- PVH
- Pond5
- Prestige Brands
- Price Chopper Supermarkets
- PricewaterhouseCoopers
- The Princeton Review

=== Q ===
- Quadrangle Group

=== R ===
- Ralph Lauren Corporation
- Random House
- Reader's Digest
- Regeneron Pharmaceuticals
- Revlon
- RFID Journal
- Rick's Picks
- Robert Graham
- RTTS

=== S ===
- Saks Fifth Avenue
- Sam Ash Music
- Scholastic Corporation
- Seneca Foods
- Simon & Schuster
- Skanska USA Inc
- Skooba Design
- Sony Corporation of America
- Stavatti Aerospace
- Steven Madden
- Stewart's Shops
- Strat-O-Matic
- STV Inc.
- Sullivan & Company
- SuperFresh
- Supreme
- Systemax

=== T ===
- Take-Two Interactive
- TheStreet.com
- TIAA
- Tiffany & Co.
- Time Life
- Topps
- Tops Friendly Markets
- Toshiba America Inc.
- Trans World Entertainment
- The Trump Organization
- TrustCo Bank

=== U ===
- United Nations
- Union Square Ventures
- UNCDF
- UNDP
- UNFPA
- UNICEF
- UNIFEM
- Univision
- Unpakt
- UN Women

=== V ===
- Verizon Communications
- ViacomCBS
- Vici Properties
- Volt Technical Resources
- Vornado Realty Trust

=== W ===
- Warner Bros. Discovery
- Warner Music Group
- Wegmans
- Wooter
- WeWork

=== Z ===
- Zoo York

== Companies formerly based in New York ==
=== 0-9 ===
- 21st Century Fox

=== A ===
- Alling and Cory
- Alcoa
- Alpha Books
- Altria
- American Airlines
- Arbitron
- Asbury Automotive Group
- Atari
- Avon Products
- AXA

=== B ===
- Bankers Trust
- Barr Pharmaceuticals
- Bausch & Lomb
- Bear Stearns
- Benihana
- Bovis Lend Lease

=== C ===
- Chemical Bank
- CIT Group
- Colecovision
- CommutAir

=== D ===
- DC Comics
- Deloitte
- Dover Corporation

=== E ===
- EOS Airlines
- Eastern Airlines

=== F ===
- First Niagara Bank
- Forest Laboratories

=== G ===
- General Electric
- General Laundry Machine
- Genesee & Wyoming
- Gentiva Health Services
- George Schlegel Lithographing Co.
- Giant Markets
- Grand Union
- Gulf+Western

=== H ===
- Hachette Filipacchi Media U.S.
- Harden Furniture
- R.H. Hooper & Company

=== I ===
- ImClone Systems

=== K ===
- Kahr Arms
- Kaplan, Inc.
- Kaye Scholer
- KPMG

=== L ===
- Lehman Brothers
- Loehmann's
- Lord & Taylor

=== M ===
- Maco
- Manufacturers Hanover Corporation
- MRU Holdings

=== N ===
- News Corporation
- North American Airlines
- North Fork Bank
- NYSE Euronext

=== P ===
- Pan Am
- Paramount Communications
- Paris Decorators Corporation
- Penn Traffic
- Playboy Automobile Company

=== R ===
- Rome Company, Inc.

=== S ===
- Sbarro
- Schlumberger Ltd.
- Scientific Games Corporation
- Sirius Satellite Radio
- Six Flags
- Snapple Beverage Corp
- Sofro Restaurant Corporation
- Sony BMG

=== T ===
- TGI Fridays
- togglethis
- Tower Air
- Toys R Us
- TWA
- Tru Kids
- Turtle Beach Corporation
- Tyco

=== U ===
- USGlobal Airways

=== V ===
- Viacom (1952-2005)

=== W ===
- Warnaco Group
- Warner Communications
- The Weinstein Company
- Whisps
- With Clarity

== See also ==
- List of companies based in New York City
