= Maco =

Maco may refer to:

- Maco (singer), Japanese singer-songwriter
- Maco, Davao de Oro, a municipality in the Philippines
- Maco light, an atmospheric ghost light in Maco, North Carolina
- MACO (Military Assault Command Operations), a fictional military unit seen in Star Trek: Enterprise
- OG Maco (1992–2024), a rapper known for the hit single "U Guessed It"
- Maco, another name for the Marueta people
- Malcolm Marshall, former West Indies cricketer

== Business ==
- Maco (film company), a German film company
- Maco (toy company)
- Maconomy, Danish software company with OMX Nordic Exchange stock symbol MACO

== See also ==
- MAACO
- Mako (disambiguation)
