= GPJ =

GPJ may refer to:

- George P. Johnson, an American marketing company
- Global Press Journal
