= Makos =

Makos is a surname. Notable people with the surname include:

- Adam Makos (born 1981), American historian
- Christopher Makos (born 1948), American photographer
- Grigoris Makos (born 1987), Greek footballer

== See also ==
- Mako (disambiguation)
