= 10x =

10x or 10X may refer to:

- 10x Management, an American talent management company
- 10x Genomics, an American biotechnology company
- Windows 10X, an abandoned edition of Microsoft's operating system
- A grade of powdered sugar fineness
- An innovation program within the Technology Transformation Services division of the General Services Administration
- Zeolite 10X, a calcium-type molecular sieve with faujasite framework structure
