= Bathrooms.com =

British retailer of bathroom goods

- Available in: English
- Founded: 2004
- Headquarters: Watford, {{{location_country}}}
- Area served: United Kingdom
- Industry: Retail
- Products: Bathroom equipment
- Employees: 50
- Website: www.bathrooms.com
- Current status: Active

Bathrooms.com is a British retailer of bathroom goods, such as baths, sinks and toilets.

Established in 2004, the company is based in Watford, Hertfordshire and employs 50 staff.

== Overview ==
The company estimates that one in fifty British homes contains one or more of its products.

In 2013, the company attracted media attention for its decision to "reshore", bringing a larger proportion of its manufacturing back from China to the UK.

== See also ==
- Twyford Bathrooms
- Kohler Kitchen & Bath
