= Krinos =

Krinos (Greek: Κρίνος) may refer to:

- Krinos Foods, a North American company that imports and manufactures Greek food
- Krinos, Achaea, a village in Achaea, Greece
