= Schlegel (disambiguation) =

Schlegel is a German surname.

Schlegel may also refer to:

== Places ==
- Schlegel, Saxony, a village in the district of Löbau-Zittau in Saxony belonging to the town of Zittau
- Schlegel, Thuringia, a municipality in the district of Saale-Orla-Kreis in Thuringia

== Other uses ==
- 12659 Schlegel, a main-belt asteroid
- Schlegel International, a multi-national company that makes seals for windows and doors in buildings and automobiles
- a drum stick (German)

== See also ==
- Christian Schlegel Farm, a historic farm in Pennsylvania
- George Schlegel, a New York printing company
- Schlegel diagram, a geometric projection described in 1886 by Victor Schlegel
