= Jack Strong =

Jack Strong may refer to:

- Jack Strong (film), a 2014 Polish political thriller film
- CIA pseudonym of Colonel Ryszard Kukliński, a Cold War-era Polish spy for NATO
- Jack Strong (footballer) (1884–?), Australian rules footballer
- Jack Strong, bassist with The Acacia Strain
- Jack Boynton Strong (1930–2015), American politician

== See also ==
- John Strong (disambiguation)
