= AEC Daily =

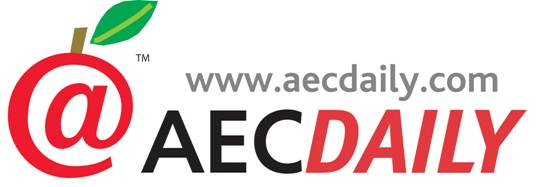
- Company type: Privately held company
- Industry: Online education,
- Founded: June 12, 2001 in Ontario, Canada
- Founders: Jeff Rice and Stéphane Deschênes
- Headquarters: Newmarket, Ontario, Canada and Buffalo, New York United States
- Services: e-learning for construction professionals, architects, engineers, and designers
- Owners: Jeff Rice and Stéphane Deschênes
- Website: aecdaily.com

AEC Daily is a Canadian/American company that provides online education for architects, engineers, and other construction professionals.

AEC Daily works with building product manufacturers to offer continuing education courses in a variety of subjects. AEC Daily Inc. is based in Newmarket, Ontario, Canada and AEC Daily Corporation is based in Buffalo, New York United States.

== History ==
AEC Daily was founded by Jeff Rice and Stéphane Deschênes in 2001. They are still the owners of the company.

== Services ==
=== Continuing Education ===
Online education courses are the main field of AEC Daily. They provide over 1,000 courses for construction professionals, architects, engineers, designers and landscapers. Most courses are free because they are sponsored by building product manufacturers such as Kohler Kitchen and Bath, Makita, and Wine Cellar Innovations.

=== Products/Services directory ===
The Building Products/Services directory is administrated by AEC Daily and comprises several thousand companies. It is subdivided into the main categories Software, Hardware, Support Services, firms and Associations.

== Associations ==
AEC Daily works closely with many different associations to offer only courses that meet the requirements or have been reviewed and approved by them. Some of these associations include:

- In the United States: American Institute of Architects, U.S. Green Building Council, Construction Specifications Institute, Society of American Registered Architects.
- In Australia: Australian Institute of Landscape Architects, Building Designers Association of Australia.
- In Canada: Royal Architectural Institute of Canada.
- In Europe: Association of Architects of Milan, Royal Institute of British Architects, Netherlands Architecture Institute.
