= John Strong =

John Strong may refer to:

== People ==
- John Strong (mariner), English captain who made the first recorded landing on the Falkland Islands, in 1690
- John Strong (Michigan politician) (1830–1913), politician from the U.S. state of Michigan
- John Strong (Vermont politician) (1738–1816), American politician
- John Franklin Alexander Strong (1856–1929), Alaskan politician
- John Strong (educationalist) (1868–1945), British educationalist
- John Clifford Strong (1922–2003), British governor of the Turks and Caicos, 1978–1982
- John Anderson Strong (1915–2012), Scottish surgeon and academic
- John D. Strong (1905–1992), professor of physics and astronomy
- John S. Strong (born 1948), American religion academic
- John Strong (actor) (born 1969), Ukrainian pornographic actor and director
- Johnny Strong (born 1974), American actor and composer
- John Strong (sportscaster) (born 1985), American television sportscaster
- John Strong (colonist) (1610–1699), English-born New England colonist and politician
- John Strong Sr. (1798–1881), English–American farmer and politician

== Other uses ==
- Mrs. John L. Strong, a privately held American luxury company and manufacturer of custom papers and stationery

== See also ==
- Jack Strong (disambiguation)
- John Strong Newberry (1822–1892), U.S. geologist
- John Stronge of the Stronge baronets
