= Playboy Automobile Company =

Defunct American motor vehicle manufacturer

- Industry: Automotive
- Fate: folded
- Headquarters: Buffalo, New York, United States
- Key people: Lou Horwitz; Charlie Thomas; Norm Richardson
- Products: Playboy Convertible automobile
- Brands: Playboy

Playboy Motor Car Corporation was a Buffalo, New York-based automobile company, established in 1947. Playboy offered a small, one seating row convertible, which was one of the first to come standard from factory with a multi-part, retractable hardtop.

The company only made 99 cars including 1 prototype, 97 finished serial numbered production cars, as well as 1 unfinished car numbered 98 which has survived with zero miles on the odometer (99 cars total), before going bankrupt in 1951.

== The company ==
Company founder Lou Horwitz was a Packard dealer who after World War 2 saw a need for a new smaller car for postwar America, a cheaper car than the Packards he sold. It would be built from outsourced parts and cost around $900. Horwitz recruited friends Norm Richardson (a skilled mechanic) and Charlie Thomas (a former Pontiac engineer). In the wake of Preston Tucker's bad press they had difficulty forming a dealer network, and only finished 97 production cars before declaring bankruptcy in 1951.

== The Playboy convertible prototype ==
Playboy Convertible prototype

Overview
- Manufacturer: Playboy Motor Car Corporation
- Also called: Playboy PR
- Production: 1
- Model years: 1947
- Assembly: Buffalo, New York, USA

Body and chassis
- Body style: 2 door convertible
- Layout: rear-engine, rear-wheel-drive layout

Chronology
- Successor: Playboy Convertible production model

The original prototype shares the same general shape as the production model, but features a rear mounted engine layout and a soft folding top.

=== The Playboy prototype today ===
It is owned and has been restored by company founder Lou Horwitz's grandson David Kaplan. According to Kaplan, "The black one never had an official number. When I restored it I put a PR on it for prototype." and "I finished it in the early '90s and I don't drive it much but I do drive it."

== The Playboy convertible production model ==
Playboy Convertible
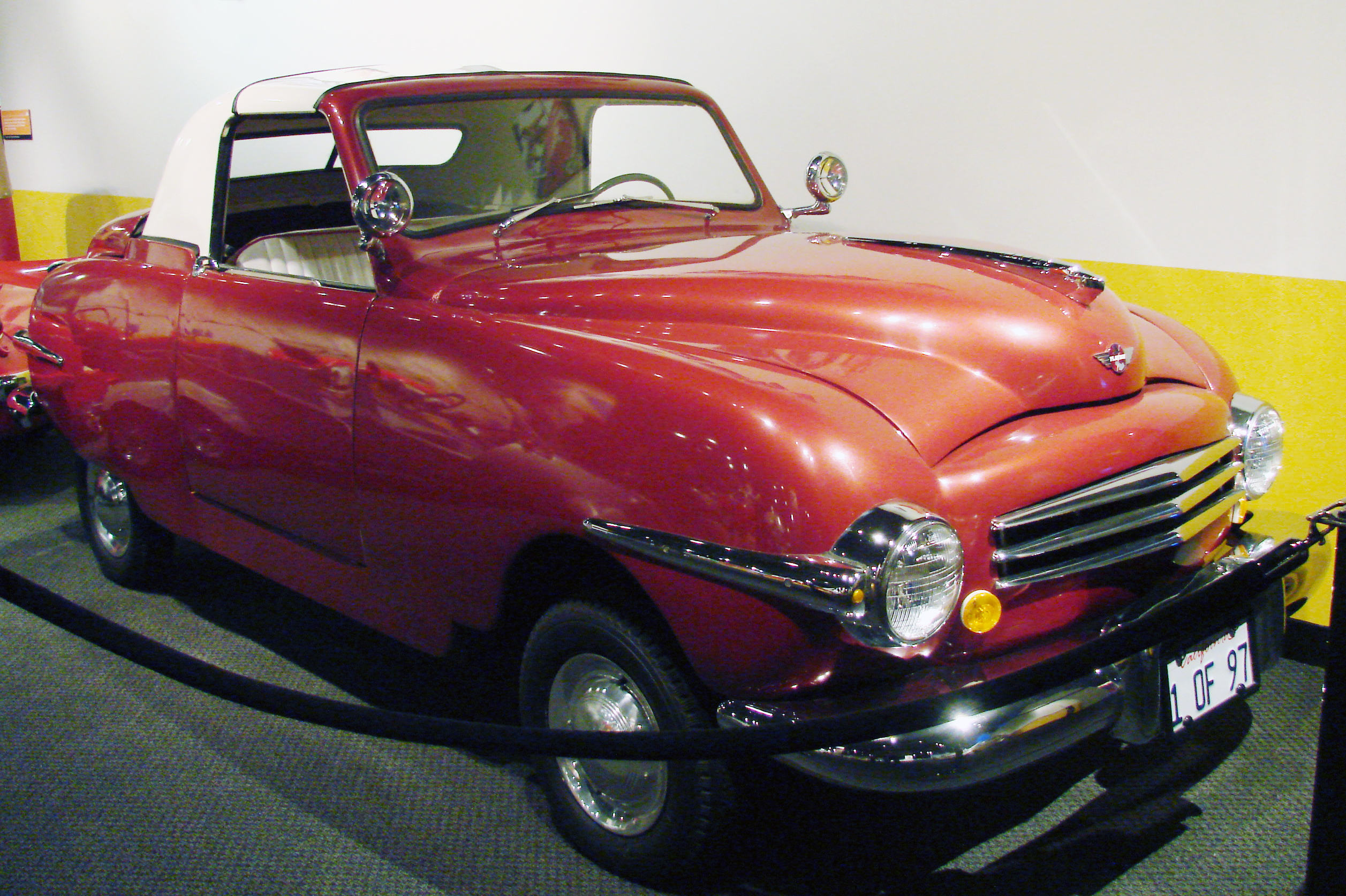
- 1948 Playboy Convertible, (one of 97); seen at the Petersen Automotive Museum in LA, in 2008.

Overview
- Manufacturer: Playboy Motor Car Corporation
- Production: 1947–1951. 97 production cars plus one unfinished survivor numbered 98
- Assembly: Buffalo, New York

Body and chassis
- Body style: 2 door convertible
- Layout: front-engine, rear-wheel-drive

Powertrain
- Engine: Hercules flathead inline four-cylinder (early models); Continental flathead inline four-cylinder 2 L (92 cu in) (later models)
- Transmission: 3 speed manual transmission

Dimensions
- Wheelbase: 90 in (2,286 mm)
- Length: 155 in (3,937 mm)
- Curb weight: 2,035 lb (923 kg)

Chronology
- Predecessor: Playboy Convertible prototype

The Playboy had a 40 hp (30 kW) Continental four-cylinder sidevalve engine driving a three-speed manual transmission. It would get 35 mpg_{‑US} (6.7 L/100 km; 42 mpg_{‑imp}). It would accelerate from 0-30 mph (48 km/h) in six seconds, and 0-50 mph (80 km/h) in 17 seconds. Advertised top speed was 75 mph (121 km/h).

With a 90 in (2,286 mm) wheelbase (10 in (254 mm)) less than the Rambler American), the Playboy measured 156 in (3,962 mm) long overall, and was priced at just US$985. It ran on 12-inch-diameter (30 cm) rims, and weighed 1,900 lb (860 kg). It was offered as a three-passenger convertible with a folding steel top. (A station wagon was planned, but never built.)

Under-capitalized, Playboy could not compete with better-financed companies offering more conventional cars.

== Playboy cars today ==
Of 97 production cars sold, only about 43 are believed to survive today. Five (including the prototype) are owned by David Kaplan, grandson of company founder Lou Horwitz. Today Kaplan is an authority on his grandfather's car.

Playboy with convertible hard-top – Amsterdam International Autoshow (AutoRAI), 1948
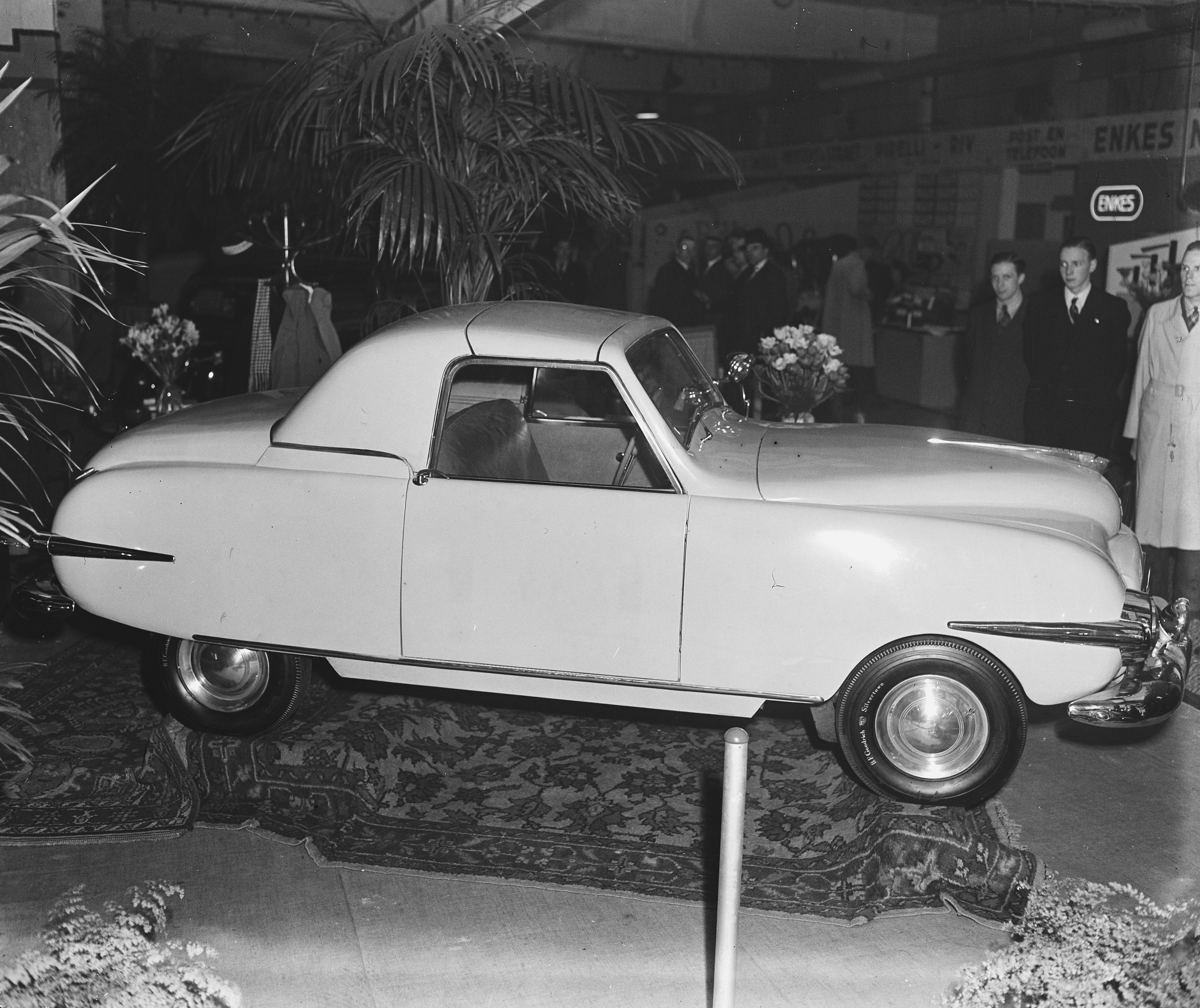
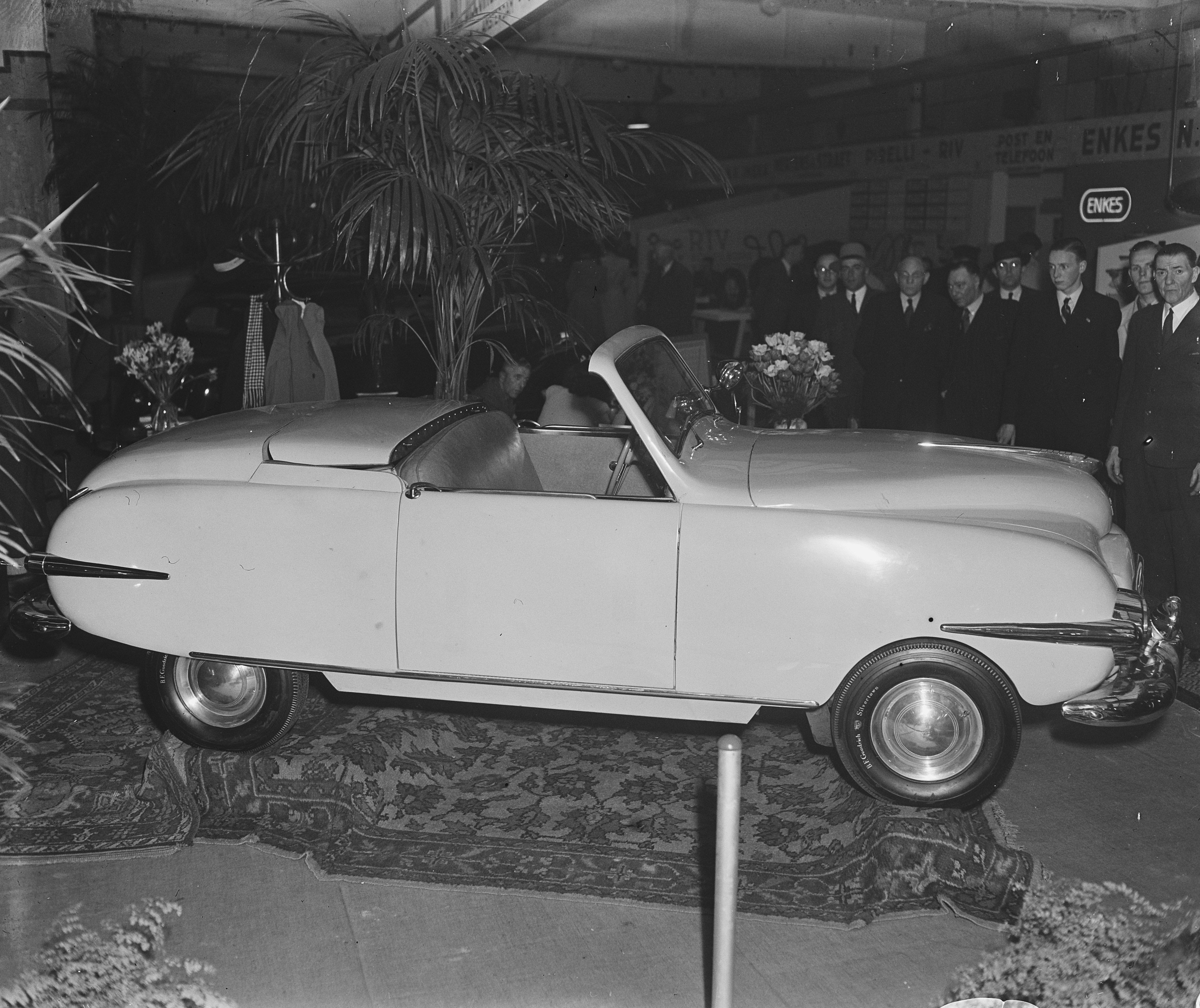
Photographs show the Playboy with top in closed and opened configuration.

== See also ==
- List of defunct automobile manufacturers of the United States
- List of automobile manufacturers of the United States
- List of New York companies

== Sources ==
- Flory, J. "Kelly", Jr. American Cars 1946-1959. Jefferson, NC: McFarland & Coy, 2008.
