= Alling & Cory Buffalo Warehouse =

- U.S. National Register of Historic Places
- New York State Register of Historic Places
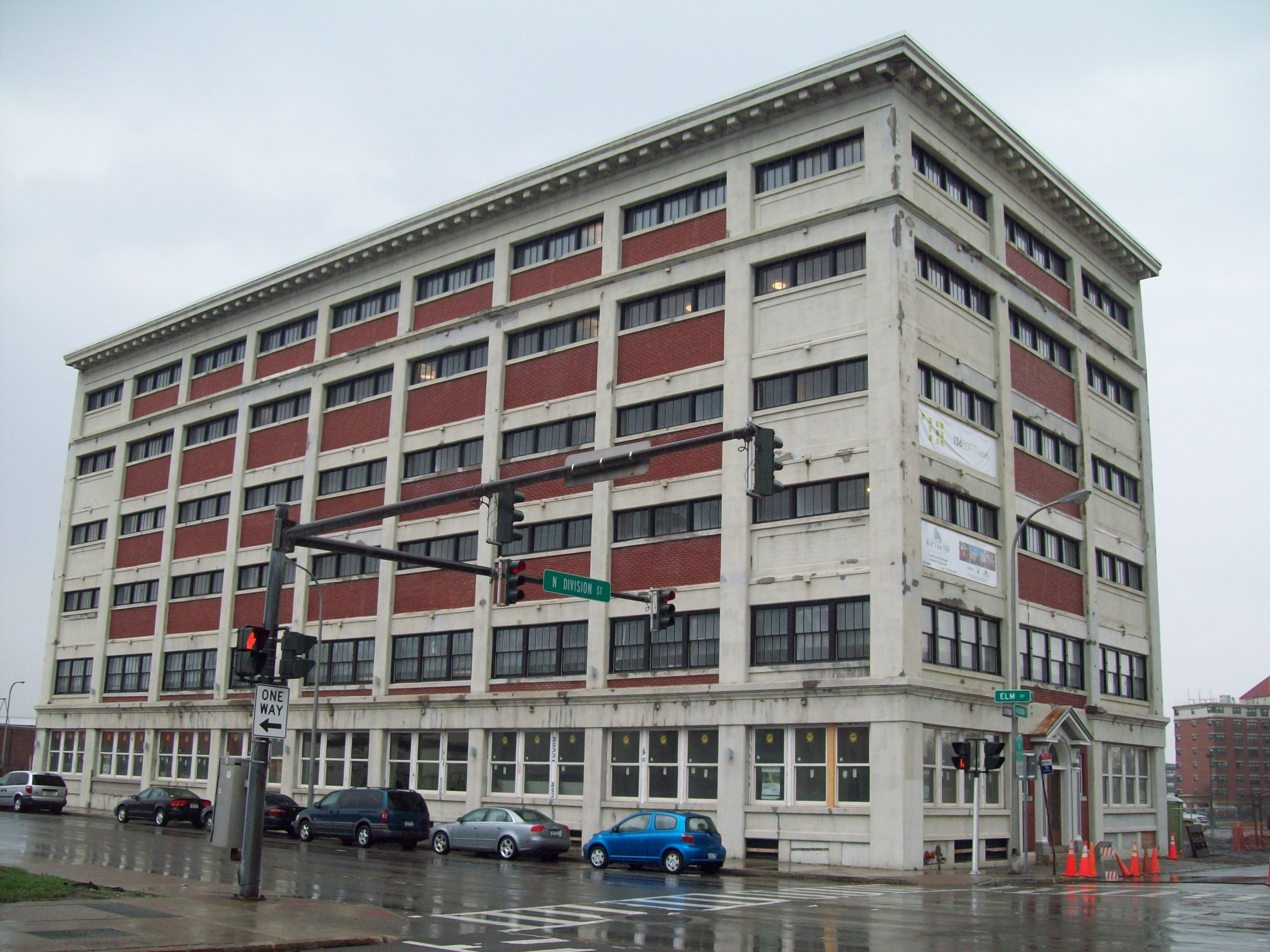
- Alling & Cory Buffalo Warehouse, April 2010

- Location within New York Location within the United States
- Location: 136 N. Division St., Buffalo, New York
- Coordinates: 42°52′58.54″N 78°52′10.56″W
- Area: 1.19 acres (0.48 ha)
- Built: 1910-1911
- Architects: R. J. Reidpath and Sons
- NRHP reference No.: 10000026
- NYSRHP No.: 02940.006769

Significant dates
- Added to NRHP: February 27, 2010
- Designated NYSRHP: January 4, 2010

Alling & Cory Buffalo Warehouse is a historic warehouse building located at Buffalo in Erie County, New York. It consists of a six-story, L-shaped, 120,000-square-foot (11,000 m^{2}) former paper warehouse building built in 1910-1911 for the Alling & Cory company of Rochester, with a one-story, brick loading dock addition built in 1926. It is built of reinforced concrete with classical detailing and considered to be of the "Daylight Factory" design. The building has been rehabilitated into an apartment complex.

It was listed on the National Register of Historic Places in 2010.
