= Troy Laundry =

Manufacturing company

The Troy Laundry Machinery Co., Ltd. was a Troy, New York, laundry machinery manufacturing company which incorporated on January 1, 1881. The company made hydraulic washers, wringers (mangles), starching machines, dampners, calenders, and shirt, collar, and cuff ironers.

The company operated branches in New York, Chicago, London, and Berlin.

== See also ==
- General Laundry Machine
- Troy Laundry Building (disambiguation)
