= Sterling Optical =

American eyewear company

- Type: Subsidiary
- Industry: Optometry
- Founded: 1914; 112 years ago in New York City
- Headquarters: Garden City, New York, United States
- Number of locations: 50+
- Area served: United States
- Products: Optician chain
- Parent: Emerging Vision Inc
- Website: www.sterlingoptical.com

Sterling Optical is an American franchised retail optical chain headquartered in New York, New York. Its parent company is Emerging Vision, whose CEO is Glenn Spina.

As of July 2014, the company had more than 125 Sterling locations in the United States and the U.S. Virgin Islands, plus 40 Site for Sore Eyes locations in California.

== History ==
Sterling Optical opened in 1914 with a single store in the financial district of New York City. In 1954, a second location opened in Washington, D.C.

In 1966, Sterling Optical acquired IPCO, a retail optical chain in the northeastern United States. The chain grew to 20 stores by 1970 and to 65 by 1975. Over the next 5 years, the chain grew to almost 130 stores.

By the end of the 1980s, Sterling Optical was losing money. To raise capital, it refocused on its optical division and sold its diaper, uniform, and dental equipment subsidiaries in 1989 and 1990. New senior leadership was also brought in.

In 1992, the company filed for Chapter 11 bankruptcy protection and was delisted from the New York Stock Exchange. At the time, it had 105 company-owned optical stores and franchised 113 outlets in the United States and Canada. Sterling Optical emerged from bankruptcy after being purchased by Robert and Alan Cohen of Cohen's Fashion Optical. It was reorganized and incorporated in New York and renamed Sterling Vision Inc., with stores doing business as Sterling Optical.

In 1993, it acquired the Site for Sore Eyes chain in California, and with it VCC (Vision Centers of California), a specialized healthcare maintenance organization licensed by the California Department of Corporations that operates under the tradename Sterling VisionCare, usually adjacent to a Sterling Optical location. In 1996 the company acquired Vision Centers of America.

In 1996, the company opened two lasik centers named Insight Laser Centers, one in New York and the other in San Francisco. These locations have since ceased operations. In 1997, Sterling acquired Singer Specs, a 30-store chain based in Pennsylvania.

In 2000, the company was renamed Emerging Vision and would focus on online sales. The Sterling Optical name was retained as the company's retail division. However, Sterling lost $18 million in the first nine months of the year and the Cohens gave up day-to-day operations by January 2001.

In March 2001, Emerging Vision's online sales operations were shut down completely. Offices in Dallas and New York City were closed. By June, the company was in danger of being delisted from the New York Stock Exchange. Its ambulatory eye surgery center in East Meadow, New York was sold off. Following an attempted takeover by its largest shareholder, Emerging Vision put greater focus into its franchising division. Robert Hillman, previously of Pearle Vision, was brought on to serve as CEO of the 225-store chain.

In 2005, the company announced it had returned to profitability. Sterling Optical also began using cartoon character Mr. Magoo in advertising.

In 2006, the company paid $2.5 million to acquire Combine Optical Management, an optical buying group based in Boca Raton, Florida. In 2007, Emerging Vision also acquired The Optical Group, a buying group based in Canada, for $3.6 million. Both acquisitions combined brought in over 1,500 retail members. Sterling Optical entered Kentucky in 2007 when franchises were opened in Georgetown and Lexington.

Emerging Vision was taken private in 2011.
