= Sterling Plumbing =

American plumbing product manufacturer

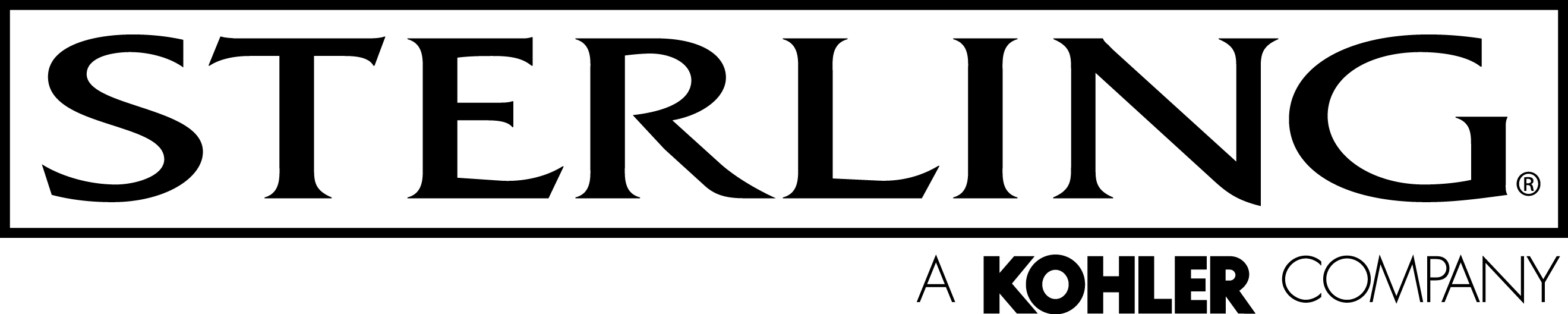
- Industry: Plumbing
- Predecessor: Sterling Specialty Company; Sterling Faucet Company; Rockwell International - Building Components Division; Sterling Plumbing Group Inc.
- Founded: 1907; 119 years ago in Newcomerstown, Ohio, United States
- Headquarters: Kohler, Wisconsin, United States of America
- Products: Plumbing Fixtures
- Owner: Kohler Co.
- Website: www.sterlingplumbing.com

Sterling Plumbing is the brand-name of a line of plumbing products manufactured by Kohler Co. The company designs and manufactures a diverse selection of product for the kitchen and bath, including faucets, toilets, sinks, whirlpool tubs, shower doors and bathroom accessories.

== History ==
=== Early years ===
The earliest roots of the company trace back to 1907 when two brothers from Pittsburgh, Pennsylvania, Clark and John M. Beggs, built a factory in Crafton, Pennsylvania to produce household gas valves for fireplaces and boiler stands. In the same year, a man called John Wesley "J.W." Ruby, started working in the factory as a buffer. J.W. Ruby later would be president of the company. In 1913, The Sterling Specialty Company of Pittsburgh, Pennsylvania was established. The same year, the company built a facility at Newcomerstown, Ohio.

In 1931, the company was renamed as The Sterling Faucet Company. The company specialized in the production of faucets. The company also provided services of chrome and nickel plating for auto parts and for doctor's and dentist's instruments.

On October 1, 1936, the company requested a federal court to declare them insolvent and grant permission to reorganize under the U.S. Bankruptcy laws.

On March 16, 1939, a fire destroyed the Sterling Faucet facility of Newcomerstown, Ohio. After the fire was extinguished, it was unclear whether or not the facility would be reconstructed. The company had approximately 80 employees at the moment of the fire.

=== Mid-20th century ===
On April 9, 1940, it was announced the Sterling Faucet Company will be moved to Morgantown, West Virginia. On June 12, 1940, it was reported the Sterling Faucet Company completed the transference of its assets to the former Sabraton Works facility of the American Sheet and Tin Plate Company. J.W. Ruby was placed in charge of the Morgantown facility.

During the United States’ participation in World War II, Sterling shifted the brass operations into military manufacturing.

On October 20, 1944, Sterling Faucet Co. announced plans for a considerable expansion of the plant.

On September 13, 1948, the company Sa-Mor Quality Brass, Inc. was established in Morgantown, West Virginia.

In 1952, Sterling Faucet Company organized three corporations at Reedsville, West Virginia: Pittsburgh Valve Company, Sterling Manufacturing Company and Hardware Brass Manufacturing Company. By 1953 the three corporations in Reedsville had 62 employees.

On July 9, 1953, Sterling Faucet Company incorporated Sa-Mor Quality Brass, Inc. as a new subsidiary with the name of Sterling Tubular Products. In 1953, the plant of Sterling Tubular Products had 87 workers while the plant of Sterling Faucet Company had 571 workers.

On December 24, 1958, Sterling President, J. Wesley Ruby, announced the purchase of a Glauber of Texas, Inc. which was a brass manufacturing plant located in Tyler, Texas with 115 employees. In the same press release, it was informed that two more plants, one in Ohio and one in Massachusetts will be integrated with five the company operates in West Virginia

In August 1961, the Canada Sterling subsidiary, Sterling Faucet Canada Ltd bought from United Carr Fastener Canada Ltd a plant in Oakville, Ontario, Canada with the purpose of establishing a facility for the manufacturing of plumbing brass products. The company planned to employ 50 workers during the first year.

In August 1962, the Reynolds Gas Regulator Company (subsidiary of Arkansas Louisiana Gas Company) announced the construction of a gas regulator and meter facility in Sheridan, Arkansas. One year later (in August 1963) while the plant was under construction, Arkla Industries Inc. sold the plant to Rockwell Manufacturing Co. The plant later will be transformed into a faucet manufacturing facility.

By 1967, Sterling Faucet Co. reached US$28 million in sales. Sterling Faucet Company operated plants in Reedsville, West Virginia, Tyler, Texas, and Oakville, Ontario, Canada employing about 2,000 workers.

On November 18, 1968, Rockwell Manufacturing Co. agreed to purchase Sterling Faucet Co. and the three subsidiaries, Sterling Manufacturing Co., Sterling Tubular Products Inc. and Sterling Faucet Canada Ltd. When the purchase was complete, Sterling Faucet Company became a subsidiary of Rockwell for the following years.

=== Late 20th century ===
In 1973, Rockwell International Corp., renamed the Sterling Faucet division as the Building Components Division. Rockwell started manufacturing faucets under the Rockwell brand.

On January 10, 1974, the Building Components division of Rockwell International informed the closing of its plant in Tyler Texas citing duplication of production facilities. The plant had 150 employees at the time of the announcement.

On November 7, 1977, Rockwell International Corp, informed it may sell the Building Components division since there were several prospective buyers. It was also announced it will close the plant of Reedsville, West Virginia merging it with the operations of the plant in Morgantown, West Virginia. After the closing of the Reedsville Plant, the operations of the division remained in the plants of Sheridan, Arkansas, and Morgantown, West Virginia.

In 1978, William W. Boyd and David C. Wright bought the company to Rockwell International and renamed it as Sterling Faucet Company. The company was reformed as a privately held firm.

in 1980, Sterling introduced to the market the Accent brand of faucets.

On January 26, 1984, Kohler Co. announced the purchase of Sterling Faucet Co. Kohler officials mentioned the purchase will allow the company to enter in the economy end of the faucet market, expand its markets and broad the product lines. As part of the acquisition, the brass foundry and injection molding plant of Morgantown, West Virginia and the assembly and injection molding plant of Sheridan, Arkansas (were 700 and 250 workers were employed respectively) became part of Kohler. The Sterling and Accent brands were integrated into Kohler Kitchen & Bath family of products. After the acquisition, Kohler started expanding the offering of Sterling branded products adding in the following years, tube doors, shower doors, corner shower enclosures, bathing fixtures, vitreous china fixtures, and other bathroom accessories to the existing faucets line.

On December 29, 1986, Sterling Faucet Co. announced the acquisition of Polar Stainless Products Inc. which owned a plant in Searcy, Arkansas since 1965 and employed 150 workers. The acquisition brought stainless steel sinks to the Sterling family of products.

In 1987, Sterling Faucet Co. purchased the Bath Products Division and related patented technology of the then struggling company, Owens Corning. The purchase included a manufacturing plant in Huntsville, Alabama that was built in 1972. This purchase brought the Vikrell (a poly-resin/plastic and fiberglass compound) line of bathing fixtures to Sterling.

On March 31, 1988, the company was renamed as Sterling Plumbing Group Inc. Sterling Plumbing Group focused in the manufacturing and marketing of a full line of plumbing products for the Hardware/Home Center, Plumbing and Hardware wholesale, Builder and Specialized OEM market channels.

On November 16, 1988, Sterling bought Kinkead Industries (a subsidiary of USG Corporation) and its manufacturing plant in Union City, Tennessee. This purchase added folding shower doors, tub and shower enclosures to the Sterling family of products.

From 1994 to 1996, the faucet operations at Morgantown, West Virginia were transferred to facilities in the cities of Sheridan and Malvern, Arkansas. At the same time, the corporate offices moved to Rolling Meadows, Illinois.

On July 2, 1999, the company Sterling Plumbing Group Inc. was merged with Kohler Co. By the end of the year, the logos located in the facilities of the Sterling Plumbing Group were replaced by the Kohler logo.

=== 21st century ===
In January 2003, in a press release, Sterling Plumbing announced the discontinuation of the entire faucet product line to focus in other group of plumbing products. Production of faucets continued in the different Kohler facilities under the Kohler brand. The discontinuation included the faucet lines Nova™, Starflo™, Gemini™, Tribute™, Eminence™, Progression™, bath/shower drains and accessories.

On January 13, 2012, Kohler co. announced the faucet facility at Malvern Arkansas will be closed and the existing operations will be transferred to the facilities in Sheridan Arkansas and Kohler Wisconsin.

In 2015, Sterling introduced a stainless steel kitchen Sink that included a pull-out kitchen sink faucet with soap dispenser. This brings back, in a limited way, a kitchen faucet to the current Sterling line of products, which did not occurred since 2004.

== See also ==
- Kohler Co.
- The Vollrath Company
