= Project Worldwide =

American advertising holding company

- Type: Private
- Industry: Advertising and marketing
- Founded: 2010
- Headquarters: Auburn Hills, Michigan, U.S.
- Key people: Chris Meyer; CEO and Board Member
- Website: project.com

Project Worldwide, sometimes simplified as Project, is a privately held Auburn Hills, Michigan-based advertising holding company. Founded in 2010, the company owns 14 agencies through an employee stock ownership structure. Project's portfolio of agencies includes ARGONAUT, Darkhorse, G7 Entertainment Marketing, George P. Johnson, MNSTR, Motive, NOMOBO, OS Studios, Partners & Napier, Praytell, Raumtechnik, Spinifex Group, Talisman and Wondersauce.

Since May 2025, the CEO is Chris Meyer. Previously, the company's Chairman and CEO was Robert G. Vallee Jr.

Project was named in Ad Age's 2024 list of the world's top agency holding companies.

== History ==
Project Worldwide was founded in 2010 by Robert G. Vallee, Jr., then Chairman and CEO of George P. Johnson, an event and brand marketing firm based in Auburn Hills, Michigan. George P. Johnson, which traces its history back to 1914, managed several agencies it had previously acquired, including California-based agency Juxt, Australian agency Spinifex Group and Germany's Raumtechnik. The company's executives formed Project Worldwide as a holding company, to include George P. Johnson, and the company was structured so that its employees would own 100% of the company through an employee stock-ownership plan (ESOP).

In 2011, the company acquired Rochester, NY-based agency Partners & Napier.

In November 2012, the company acquired Denver, Colorado-based full service agency Motive.

In March 2013, Project funded the launch of ARGONAUT, an advertising agency based in San Francisco, which became one of Project's agencies. In May, the company launched shopper marketing firm Shoptology.

In August 2016, Project acquired Brooklyn-based public relations agency Praytell. In October, the company acquired NY City-based digital creative agency Wondersauce.

In March 2017, the company launched Project Pledge, a matching program for employee donations to charitable causes. In October, Project acquired Melbourne, Australia-based consumer engagement agency Dig+Fish.

In December 2018, Project acquired Auckland, New Zealand-based experiential agency Darkhorse.

In October 2019, the company merged its Los Angeles-based agency Pitch into its Denver-based agency Motive.

In March 2021, Project acquired gaming and Gen-Z culture agency OS Studios.

In September 2021, Project's experiential agency George P. Johnson (GPJ) acquired a significant stake in creative agency NOMOBO.

In December 2023, Project made a substantial strategic investment in Dubai-based Talisman, a full-service sports marketing agency.

In September 2024, Project expanded its global capabilities with the acquisition of Paris-based creative agency MNSTR.
