= Troy Laundry Building =

Troy Laundry Building may refer to one of several buildings named after businesses using Troy Laundry machinery:

- Troy Laundry Building (Portland, Oregon)
- Troy Laundry Building (San Jose, California)
- Troy Laundry Building (Seattle)
