= Krinos Foods Canada =

- Founded: 1965; 61 years ago

Krinos Foods Canada is the largest importer, distributor, and manufacturer of Greek food in Canada. The company has production facilities in Montreal, Quebec, Toronto, Ontario and Vancouver, British Columbia. Krinos Foods also operates in the United States and Greece.
