= Schuman Cheese =

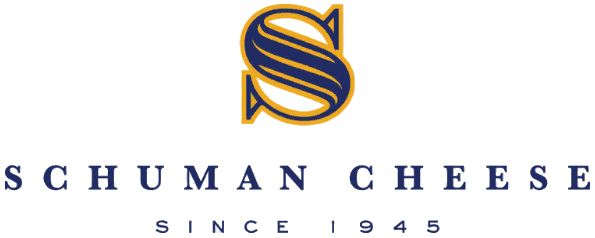
- Formerly: Arthur Schuman, Inc.
- Company type: Private
- Industry: Food processing
- Founded: 1945; 81 years ago in New York City
- Founder: Arthur Schuman
- Headquarters: Fairfield, NJ, United States
- Key people: Neal Schuman (CEO)
- Products: Cheese
- Subsidiaries: Whisps (2015-2018)
- Website: schumancheese.com

Schuman Cheese, Fairfield, New Jersey, previously known as Arthur Schuman Inc, is a U.S. importer, cheese-maker, producer and distributor of Italian and Italian-style cheeses. Since its beginning they have expanded with importing cheeses from France, Belgium, Greece, Israel, Spanish, Swiss, Dutch, and South America.

== Company timeline ==
Schuman Cheese was set up by Arthur Schuman, in 1945 as a family business with his sons Jerome and Howard. A year later the New York-based cheese importing company became Arthur Schuman, Inc. In 1948, a relationship with Argentina was established for importing South American cheeses. In 1956 the company became Roquefort Cheese's sole agent.

The company has since then also acquired Grater Inc., Lake Country Dairy, Madison Cheese, Robin Packing, Polser, Imperia Foods, and a Blue Cheese production factory in Montfort, WI, as well as becoming the sole distributor of Dodoni Greek cheeses.

In 2016 the name was changed to Schuman Cheese.

Later that year, Schuman Cheese launched a "True Cheese Mark" to counter concerns about the adulteration of cheese with ingredients such as wood pulp and plastic. Cheese bearing the label is tested by Covance Food Solutions to ensure its purity.

== Branches ==
Over the years the company has expanded internationally. Today it has a presence in New York City, Montfort, WI, Hong Kong, Henderson, NV, Fairfield, NJ, Poland, among other places.

== Awards and recognition ==
- 1987: CEO and company President Neal Schuman received the Ordre Du Mérite Agricole.
- 2009: the annual Dairy Forum honored Jerome Schuman at the National Cheese Institute's Laureate Award for his years of service to the industry.
- 2010: the company was recognized as one of New Jersey's Top 20 Private Companies.
- 2011: the US government chose Neal Schuman to begin four terms of service on Dairy and Animal, ATAC committee.
- Four presidents of the Cheese Importers Association of America have been from Arthur Schuman Inc. and among other service.
- 2017: 3 Best of Class Awards, a Third Place Award at the US Championship Cheese Contest.
