= MapEasy =

American travel company

MapEasy Inc.
- Type: Private
- Industry: Tourism
- Founded: 1990
- Products: Travel guides

MapEasy is a travel publishing company located in Wainscott, New York. The company was founded in 1990, starting with 3 titles, and currently produces maps and other travel content for over 150 cities worldwide.

The company's maps have received generally favorable reviews from major publications. The New York Times has described the maps as "friendly" but "with attitude", while the Washington Post has called them "charmingly illustrated and elegantly hand-lettered". Reviews have not always been positive, as one reviewer from about.com, while giving the map generally favorable ratings, found the San Francisco map "too busy".

Maps from MapEasy also contain colored-pencil illustrations with comments and descriptions.
