= Lowy Frame and Restoring Company =

- Industry: Framing and art restoration
- Founded: 1907; 118 years ago in New York City
- Founder: Julius Lowy
- Key people: Larry Shar; Brad Shar
- Website: lowy1907.com

Lowy Frame and Restoring Company is a framing company founded in New York City in 1907.

== History ==
Julius Lowy opened a small shop on the corner of 56th and Sixth Ave, NYC, catering to local art dealers, private collectors and museums in 1907. Hilly Shar and partner John Sisto began working at the company in the 1930s, and took it over after Lowy died. Hilly and John continued to expand Lowy into a full fine arts services company, including paintings and paper restoration. Larry began working alongside his father full-time in 1970, succeeding him as president in 1979.

Lowy has one of the largest frame inventories in the world, featuring thousands of frames. Larry is an expert on style and period frames, and they offer reproductions of just about any frame, along with guidance regarding the appropriate nature of a particular artwork.

Today, finds its home in a six-story town house on the upper east side, with in-house master gilders, art conservators, carvers and photographers. Lowy continues to cater to top institutions, including the Metropolitan Museum of Art, the Crystler Museum of Art, as well as auction houses Sotheby's and Christie's. Larry remains president, and his son, Brad Shar, acts as vice president and general manager.

Lowy is the largest and oldest fine arts services company in the country. Articles about Lowy have been published in the New York Times, House Beautiful, Art & Antiques Magazine, and many other notable publications.

== Larry and Brad Shar ==
Larry Shar was the president of Lowy Frame and Restoring Company. The second of three generations, Larry is a frame dealer, art dealer and conservator. He graduated from Brandeis University in 1969 with a degree in fine art, but has worked in the business since he was a small child under the tutelage of his father, Hilly. For many years, Larry has been a member of the American Institute for Conservation, the Art and Antique Dealers League of America, and the Appraiser's Association of America. He has lectured about period frames all over the country, including at the prestigious NYC Winter Antiques Show.

Brad Shar, current president and owner of Lowy, has spent the last 29 years working in the family business. He started working at Lowy while still attending the New School, receiving a bachelor's degree in art history in 1996. Having both a technical and artistic side, Brad also develops and manages Lowy's computer systems and website. He started Lowy Scan, a state-of-the-art digital imaging system which matches paintings with appropriate frames, making Lowy the first fine arts company with virtual framing.

== Selected publications ==
Lowy has published hundreds of articles on antique frames, reproduction frames, framing restoration and art conservation.

- Sherer, Barrymore Laurence, “Picture Perfect,” Art & Auction Magazine, February 2007,
- Anderson, Mattias, “Framework: A New York Institution Turns 100,” Fine Arts Connoisseur, February 2007, Vol. VIII,
- Davis, Deborah, “Julius Lowy Turns 100,” Picture Framing Magazine, January 2007.
- Davis, Deborah, “The Lure of Antique Frames,” Antiques and Fine Art, January 2007.
- Stoodley, Sheila Gibson, “Beyond Borders,” Robb Report, December 2006.
- Tashjian, Cindy, “Larry and Brad Shar of Lowy,” Antiques and Fine Art, January 2005.
- Donnenburg, Linda, “Frames of Reference,” House Beautiful, November 1999.
