= Rome Company, Inc. =

Furniture business in New York, US

Rome Company, Inc. was a furniture business in Rome, New York which became bankrupt in September 1935, during the Great Depression. It had branches in many sections of the United States. The corporation's fate illustrates the bleak economic climate in the United States during the 1930s. The retailer's failure is significant in the history of Rome. It was one of several of the town's establishments which closed in 1935, a consequence of the ongoing deflation. To avoid bankruptcy, Rome Brewery, Inc., filed a petition of reorganization under Section 77B of the Bankruptcy Act of 1898, in May 1935.

== Insolvency details ==
A court in Malone, New York rejected a plan for reorganization offered by Rome Company, Inc., under Section 77B of the Bankruptcy Act of 1898. The furniture dealer had net assets of $793,000 at this time.

A court date was set for October 3, 1935 for the Rome Products Association to purchase assets for $725,000, not including cash, receivables, securities, and real estate.

Sale of the assets of Rome Company Inc., to the Rome Products Association for $725,000, was completed on October 4, 1935. Rome and Boston Real Estate was not included in the purchase. Rome Company Inc., had book assets of $2,500,000 and liabilities of $1,991,705.
