= Izzy Gold Records =

American record label

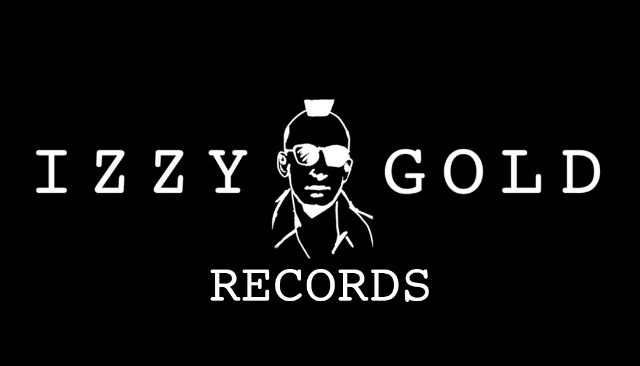
Izzy Gold Records

Izzy Gold Records (IGR) is a New York-based record label. It was founded by producer Chris Young. IGR's clientele includes Ashlee Simpson, George Clinton (funk musician) Parliament Funkadelic, Crystal Method, DJ Skribble, Starry Tiberio, American Idol's William Hung, The Four Tops, 3 time Emmy nominee Leven Rambin, Liam Mcmullan, Inspectah Deck/RZA Wu-Tang Clan, celebrity blogger Micah Jesse, Countess LuAnn de Lesseps from The Real Housewives of New York City, B. Smith, the Raveonettes and Richie Rich (designer) among others.

In December 2008 IGR's non-profit Izzy Gold Cares organization and The Tommy Hilfiger Corporate Foundation offered its recording and production services to Ronald McDonald and put on a recording session with the kids. Izzy Gold Records said it's about to meet the people behind the Azerbaijani national selection for the 2010 season of the Eurovision Song Contest.
