= Operative Media =

American advertising company

Operative Media, Inc.
- Company type: Corporation
- Industry: Digital advertising
- Founded: 2000
- Headquarters: New York City, United States
- Key people: Mike Napodano (CEO); Ben Tatta (CSO)
- Products: AOS; STAQ; Operative.One; Operative Managed Services; Operative Professional Services
- Number of employees: 1,300
- Website: www.operative.com

Operative is an American advertising company, founded and with headquarters in New York City in 2000 and offices in Denver, Atlanta, London, India, Brazil, Israel, Romania, Australia and the Netherlands. It provides media companies with ad management technology, ad trafficking services, and business process management consulting. Its current president is Mike Napodano, who replaced Lorne Brown in 2022.

== Products ==
The company has three product lines: Managed Services- which includes campaign management and ad trafficking consultancy, Professional Services- facilitating software implementation and business process consulting, and the Operative Dashboard- an ASP-based web application that aims to allow media publishers to automate contract management, product packaging and pricing, inventory management, campaign reporting and revenue recognition.

== Acquisition ==
In 2017, Operative Media was acquired by the Israel-based software company SintecMedia for just under $200 million. SintecMedia has been able to acquire Operative Media with funding from the private equity firm Francisco Partners

== Awards ==
In December 2007, then Operative CEO Mike Leo was named in the Silicon Alley 100, at number 85. he was also included in the Madison Avenue IT list for January 2008.

Inc. magazine listed Operative Media #712 out of the top 5,000 companies for 2007, and ranked it at #56 in the Top Companies in Software, and #55 in its list of the Top Companies in New York City, Northern New Jersey, and Pennsylvania.
