= Insurial =

Multinational trading company

Insurial Americas, Inc.
- Company type: Private
- Industry: International Trade, Logistics
- Founded: 2007
- Defunct: March 28, 2014
- Fate: Merger
- Headquarters: 40 Wall St, Manhattan, New York City, New York, U.S.
- Key people: Mansoor Ahmed (CEO)
- Number of employees: 650 (Worldwide)

Insurial Americas, Inc or Insurial was an American multinational corporation headquartered in Manhattan, New York City, New York, United States. The company invested in and operated the group's wholly owned subsidiaries and branches in the United Arab Emirates, China, Pakistan, Japan, and India. Insurial Americas, Inc also participated in Asia-Pacific transactions through the group's Hong Kong–based equities arm. The group's primary areas of operations were trade finance, trade negotiations, inspections, and logistics. The group's estimated revenues, prior to its merger with an undisclosed entity, were in excess of $400 million.

== Press ==
- Insurial Americas expands in Middle East Trade Finance Magazine (October 2012)
- Insurial Americas Inc's China Subsidiary Acquires Sizeable Customer Base for Trade Discounts San Francisco Chronicle
- Insurial Americas negotiates $20 million trade credit with lenders and investors American Public Media
