= ITerating =

- Industry: Software
- Founded: New York City, USA (2005)
- Headquarters: New York City, USA
- Key people: Nicolas Vandenberghe, CEO; Larry Augustin, Venture Investor
- Website: www.iterating.com

ITerating was a Wiki-based software guide, where users could find, compare and give reviews to software products. As of January 2021 the domain is listed as being for sale and the website no longer on-line. Founded in October 2005, and based in New York, ITerating was created by CEO Nicolas Vandenberghe, who saw that there was an industry need for a comprehensive resource to help evaluate software solutions.

The site aims to be a reference guide for the IT industry and includes reviews, ratings, articles, and detailed product feature comparisons. ITerating uses Semantic Web tools (including RDF - Resource Description Framework) to combine user edits with Web service feeds from other sites.

Designed for use by developers and industry consultants, ITerating allows users to contribute to categories such as Software Engineering Tools; Website Design & Tools; Website Software Tools; Website & Communication Applications & Social Networking; or to create their own category if does not exist yet.

== Wiki Matrix ==
Iterating announced the addition of a Feature Matrix in June 2007, which allows users to dynamically create customized, side-by-side feature comparisons of software solutions.
