= Wine Cellar Innovations =

American wine cellar manufacturing company

- Company type: Privately held company
- Industry: Manufacturing, wine cellar
- Founded: April 18, 1984
- Headquarters: 4575 Eastern Ave, Cincinnati, Ohio 45226, United States
- Key people: Tony Wilke
- Brands: Vintner Series, Wine Sentinel, WineMaker Series, WineZone
- Services: Manufacturing, Installation
- Owners: Jim Deckebach
- Website: www.winecellarinnovations.com

Wine Cellar Innovations is a wine cellar manufacturing company based in Cincinnati, Ohio. The company was founded by Jim Deckebach in 1984. They design, craft, and install commercial and residential wine cellars. As of 2017, they employed about 120 people. Their manufacturing takes place in Cincinnati, Ohio and most of their production is for U.S. customers, though they have completed projects for clients in Australia and other countries abroad. As of June 14, 2022, the company has closed, laying off all employees and taking its website down.

== Founding ==
After studying in France in 1973, Jim Deckebach developed a love of fine wines and foods. He returned to the U.S. to manage a restaurant and remodel homes on the side. In 1984, he built his first wine cellar, as part of a remodeling job. By the end of that year, he specialized in custom wine cellars. The current 250,000 sq. ft. facility takes up a full city block.

== Products ==
Wine Cellar Innovations offers premade wine racks for retail sale as well as custom services. Clients can send in their room measurements and discuss their needs to have wine racks designed specifically for their space.

Wine Cellar Innovations offers SFI (Sustainable Forestry Initiative) certified redwood for all their wine cellar and wine racking products. Stained products are stained with low VOC Waterboard Stains, which limit compounds released into the environment.

== Patents ==
In 2006, a trademark was filed for WineZone and approved in 2008. WineZone is an air handling and ductless split cooling system for wine cellars. With both air and water condenser options. In September 2014, a patent was filed for the WineZone Wine Shelf. One month later, a second trademark was filed for the WineZone Wine Shelf and approved in June 2015. This patent and trademark was for racks or shelves used for storing and displaying beverages. The patent number 2016/0066713A1 was published and approved in March 2016. Tony Wilke is listed as the inventor.

== In the media ==
In June 2012, Wine Cellar Innovations was featured on The Magnolia Network The Good, Better, Best Show which features home improvement transformations and room renovations. The Wine Cellar Innovations interview featured Erica Fisk from Wine Cellar Innovations and talked about custom modular racks for wine storage. These modular wine racks were used in Season 1, Episode 11, in the basement of homeowners Jeff and Anita.

In a 2011 interview with WNKU radio, Wine Cellar Innovations marketing manager Erica Fisk discussed the company's founding and business model. "We have specialized in wine cellar racking- the manufacturing of it -and just that, since 1984. In doing that, we've created a special niche operation here."

In January 2011, West Virginia Illustrated (WVi) featured an article and video of NCAA's Bob Huggins’ home renovation, including a gold series wine rack from Wine Cellar Innovations. The article and video have since been removed from the WVi website due to requests for the family's privacy.

“Ask the Decorator” author Meghan Carter interviewed Jack Diener, the Sales Manager of Wine Cellar Innovations on wine racks and proper wine storage.

In March 2012, the Atlanta Journal-Constitution Homefinder featured an article about wine cellars which included wine cellar tips from Erik Kuehne of Wine Cellar Innovations.
