= Mako =

Mako may refer to:

== Biology ==
- Aristotelia serrata, a New Zealand tree also known as mako or makomako
- Mako shark, the genus Isurus, consisting of two living and several fossil species:
  - Shortfin mako shark, Isurus oxyrinchus, the more common mako
  - Longfin mako shark, Isurus paucus, the rarer mako

== Military ==
- AgustaWestland AW109 "Mako", the service name for the light utility helicopter of the Royal New Zealand Airforce
- Fighting Makos, the 93rd Fighter Squadron based at Homestead ARB, Florida
- Mako (missile), a hypersonic air-to-air missile from Lockheed Martin
- UTAP-22 Mako, a jet UAV, a variant of the Composite Engineering BQM-167 Skeeter § UTAP-22

== Organisations ==
- MAKO Surgical Corp., a medical device company
- Mako (website), an Israeli news and entertainment portal owned by Keshet Media Group

== People ==
=== Given name ===
- Mako (actor), stage name of Japanese-American actor Makoto Iwamatsu (1933–2006)
- Mako (DJ), American DJ and electronic dance music producer, real name Alexander Seaver
- Mako (voice actress) (born 1986), member of Japanese music group Bon-Bon Blanco
- Mako Hyōdō (兵藤 まこ; born 1962), Japanese actress
- Mako Idemitsu (出光 真子; born 1940), Japanese media artist
- Mako Ishino (石野 真子; born 1961), Japanese singer and actress
- Mako Midori (緑 魔子; born 1944), Japanese actress
- Mako Miyata (宮田 真子; born 1973), Japanese singer and vocalist
- Mako Kamitsuna, American film director
- Mako Komao (駒尾 真子; born 1982), Japanese author
- Mako Komuro (小室 眞子, Komuro Mako; born 1991), formerly Princess Mako of the Japanese imperial family
- Mako Kojima (小嶋 真子; born 1997), Japanese fashion producer
- Mako Kudo (born 1997), Japanese footballer
- Mako Oliveras (born 1946), baseball player
- Mako Tabuni (1979-2012), activist for Papuan interests
- Mako Yamada (山田 真子; born 1994), Japanese kickboxer
- Mako Yamashita (山下 真瑚; born 2002), Japanese figure skater
- Mako Urushizaki (漆﨑 真子; born 1992), Japanese badminton player
- Mako Yoshikawa (born 1966), American novelist
- Mako Vunipola (born 1991), New Zealand-born English rugby player

=== Surname ===
- Gene Mako (1916–2013), American tennis player
- Laura Mako (1916–2019), American interior designer
- Zach Mako (born 1988), American politician

=== Ethnic group ===
- Maku people or Mako people, an indigenous people of South America

== Places ==
- Magong or Mako, a Taiwanese city
- Makó, a town and district seat
  - Makó District, Hungary

== Products ==
- Diamond Mako, a re-branded version of the Psion Revo PDA
- EADS Mako/HEAT, a jet aircraft
- Lancair Mako, an American kit aircraft
- Mako, a type of fine cotton produced in Egypt
- Mako, a boat brand of White River Marine Group
- Mako Shark, a series of concept cars produced by Chevrolet
- Nexus 4 (codenamed "Mako"), a smartphone by Google and LG Electronics

== In fiction ==
=== Characters ===
- Mako, a fictional scribe in the Samurai Jack comic series
- Mako, a companion character from Star Wars: The Old Republic
- Mako, a crab, the main antagonist in the 2023 musical film Under the Boardwalk
- Mako, a villain from the Savage Dragon comic book
- Mako (The Legend of Korra), a major character in The Legend of Korra
- Mako Hooker, the main character from Something's Down There by Mickey Spillane
- Mako Mankanshoku, a major character in Kill la Kill
- Mako Mori, a major character in the motion picture Pacific Rim
- Mako Rutledge, or Roadhog, a hero in Overwatch (2016 video game)
- Mako Shiraishi, one of the protagonists in the Samurai Sentai Shinkenger
- Mako Spince, a minor character introduced in Star Wars: Dark Empire
- Mako Tsunami, in the list of Yu-Gi-Oh! anime and manga characters
- Mako Urashima, the main protagonist in the anime series Mahō no Mako-chan
- Myron Mako, the main protagonist of the 2008 strategy game Robocalypse

=== Titles ===
- Mako: Island of Secrets, a television programme
- Mako: The Jaws of Death, 1976 film

=== Others ===
- Mako, a magical substance from the Final Fantasy VII metaseries
- Mako (Mass Effect) (M35 Mako), an infantry fighting vehicle in the game Mass Effect
- Mako Ballistics, a fictional weapons manufacturer in the video game Deus Ex: Invisible War
- Mako Island, a fictional island in the television programme H_{2}O: Just Add Water and in:
- Task Force Mako, an elite American task force in the video game Medal of Honor: Warfighter
- USS Mako, a fictitious United States Navy Cold War submarine which appears in the 1986 novel To Kill the Potemkin by Mark Joseph

== Other uses ==
- Mako (dance), an action dance from Tonga
- Mako (musical instrument), the West Arnhem Land name for a didgeridoo
- Mako (SeaWorld Orlando), a roller coaster at SeaWorld Orlando, opened in 2016
- Mako (template engine), a template engine library written in Python

== See also ==
- Maco (disambiguation)
- MAACO
- Mahko, grandfather of Geronimo
