= CPI Aerostructures =

American Aircraft manufacturer

- Industry: Manufacturing
- Founded: January 1980
- Founder: Arthur August
- Headquarters: Edgewood, New York
- Key people: Douglas J. McCrosson; Vincent Palazzolo; Dan Azmon
- Products: aircraft components
- Website: www.cpiaero.com

CPI Aerostructures Inc., known as CPI Aero, is a contract aircraft component manufacturer based in Edgewood, New York.

CPI's primary customers are the US Department of Defense, and also operating as a subcontractor under Boeing and Northrop Grumman.

CPI is traded on NYSE American as CVU. The company has approximately 280 employees and hires temporary employees as needed. The CEO is Douglas J. McCrosson.

After Vincent Palazzolo resigned in November 2019 in a cloud of financial problems, Dan Azmon (formerly L3 Technologies) was announced as CFO on November 19, 2019. Azmon resigned in February 2020 and the company announced it would restate its books going back to March 2018.

In 2018, CPI Aero reported $83.9 million in gross revenue, $18.1 million in gross profit, and net income of $2.2 million. Approximately half that was in government subcontracts, another 40% in commercial contracts, and the remainder under prime government contracts.

Large 2019–2020 contracts include an Air Force contract for T-38C trainer parts, E-2 Hawkeye for Northrop Grumman assemblies, A-10 re-winging for Boeing, parts for Turkish Aerospace Industries's indigenously produced T70 rotorcraft, Hover Infrared Suppression System (HIRSS) for the Sikorsky UH-60 Black Hawk, and structural assemblies for Lockheed's F-16V.

== History ==
CPI was founded as Composite Products International, Inc. in January 1980 by Arthur August, formerly of Grumman. The name was changed to Consortium of Precision Industries, Inc. in 1989, then to CPI Aerostructures, Inc. in 1992, and began using the CPI Aero trademark in 1995.

On December 30, 2018, CPI Aero acquired Welding Metallurgy Inc. and its subsidiary Compac Development Corp for $7.9 million. The combination of the two are referred to as "WMI", was founded in 1979 and specializes in aviation electrical harnesses, electromechanical, and printed circuit boards.

On April 21, 2020, CPI announced they had received $4.8 million in federally backed small business loans, the maximum allowable amount, as part of the Paycheck Protection Program. The company received scrutiny over this loan, which was aimed at small businesses suffering from the COVID-19 pandemic. The New York Times noted that this payment was given to a company that has had major accounting problems. In September 2021 the company received a delisting notice from NYSE American. This was resolved in September 2022, with the company remaining listed.
