= Abel Honor New York =

American fashion designer

- Industry: Fashion
- Founder: Kate Wasserbach
- Headquarters: New York City
- Website: https://www.abelhonornewyork.com/

Abel Honor New York is an American fashion designer.

== Label ==
Abel Honor New York was founded by designer Kate Wasserbach in 2019, after prior work with Ralph Lauren, Christian Dior, and Michael Kors. 75% of Abel Honor's original line was sold out within nine hours. The line was separated into “Recwear” and also a “Black Label”, which targeted the luxury fashion market. Largely women's wear, the line also includes unisex pieces. The label released its second collection in 2021, entitling it “Avant-Contention”, which combined couture fashion with punk music culture—both that of 1970s UK and more modern Japanese cyberpunk. The line included both men's and women's fashion, with pieces including shorts, dresses, sweaters, tops, pants, and skirts.

The label's designs have included vegan-based items, such as vegan leathers and vegan furs. The label also does not restock lines once they sell out, as a part an effort to be a sustainable clothing line.
