= GoldenSource =

American software company

GoldenSource Corporation
- Type: Private company
- Industry: Enterprise data management (EDM); Financial services
- Founded: New York City (1984)
- Headquarters: New York City, United States
- Area served: Worldwide
- Key people: James Corrigan, CEO; Derek Apfel SVP, Chief Financial Officer; Swati Tyagi SVP, Global Head of Product Management
- Products: GoldenSource edm security master entity master positions & transactions product master time-series master market data solution connections ondemand hosted and managed services professional services corporate actions data warehouse pricing
- Number of employees: 450 (2023)
- Website: www.thegoldensource.com

GoldenSource Corporation, formerly known as "Financial Technologies International," is a global software company in the enterprise data management industry, founded in 1984 and headquartered in New York City, United States, with offices in London, Mumbai, Milan, Melbourne, and Hong Kong.

== Products and services ==
GoldenSource provides enterprise data management solutions to domestic and international asset managers, banks, investment banks, broker-dealers, mutual fund companies, insurance companies, and global custodians, exchanges and depositories. The capabilities of GoldenSource cover the mastering, management, storage and distribution of all types of capital markets data, including: Securities, entities, customers, products, ESG, positions and transactions, corporate actions, pricing and market and risk data.

Typical uses of the software include: Product control, P&L attribution, IPV, client onboarding, solvency II, MiFID II, FRTB, BCBS 239, and other regulations. Financial institutions use GoldenSource software to achieve a central reliable source of data for use across trading, risk and finance.

== Clients and partners ==
Many of GoldenSource's clients include large and mid-sized financial services companies on both the buy side and sell side. They partner with a number of technology and services providers.
