= George P. Johnson =

American multinational corporation

George P. Johnson Experience Marketing
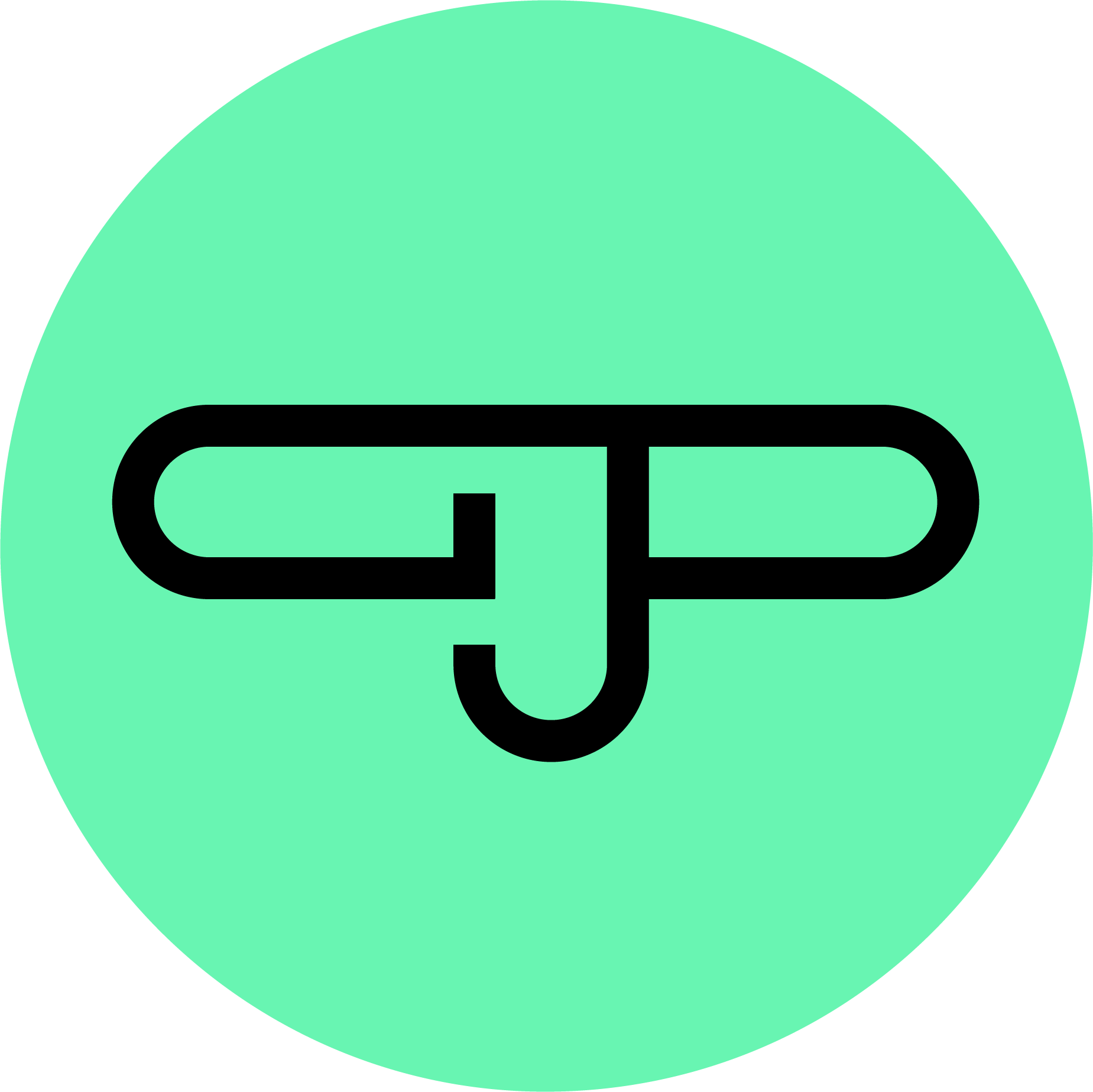
- Type: Private
- Industry: Experience Marketing, Advertising, Brand Marketing
- Founded: 1914
- Founder: George P. Johnson
- Headquarters: Auburn Hills, Michigan, USA
- Number of locations: 30
- Area served: Worldwide
- Key people: Fiona Bruder (Global CEO)
- Products: Experience Marketing, Brand Marketing, Event Management, Entertainment Marketing, Media & Content Development
- Revenue: $476.1M (2024)
- Owner: Project
- Number of employees: +1,300
- Parent: Project Worldwide
- Website: http://www.gpj.com

George P. Johnson Experience Marketing (GPJ) is an American multinational corporation and the world's leading strategic experience marketing agency that specializes in event marketing and brand marketing, with headquarters located in Auburn Hills, Michigan, United States. GPJ operates primarily as an end-to-end experiential marketing and advertisement firm, providing digital, multimedia, and physical marketing interactions, as well as offering brand management services and consulting, however GPJ holds roots traditional physical event management. GPJ has a wide variety of clients in various industries: automotive, technology, software, food & beverage, entertainment, including over 40 Fortune 500 Companies.

GPJ employs more than 1,300 people across 30 offices worldwide and operates on six continents, serving clients in North America, South America, Europe, Africa, Asia, and Oceania. The agency is part of Project Worldwide, a global network of 14 complementary marketing agencies.

== History ==
=== Origins & Early Years (1910s-1940s) ===
Founded in Detroit in 1914 by George P. Johnson Sr., the company initially made its name as a flag-making and sail-repair establishment. Throughout the years, Johnson's company began producing banners, flags and buntings for parade floats and special exhibits. By the 1920s, it was one of the nation's top three flag manufacturers and gained national attention for creating the world's largest American flag for the J.L. Hudson Co. The company's entry into exhibit design began through its relationship with the Detroit Auto Show in the late 1920s. During World War II, GPJ supported the American war effort by producing pennants and staging for Army-Navy "E" Award ceremonies. With the trade show in Detroit growing to greater prominence the early GPJ had established itself as one of the leading creators.

=== Growth and Innovation (1950s-1980s) ===
In the 1950s, GPJ expanded into auto show production, and assisted in producing the first International Auto Show in New York (1956). In 1961, the company introduced the now-standard spinning turntable for vehicle showcases which would later become an industry standard for many such events. This was the company's first venture outside of the Detroit area automotive events. Other notable achievements included the Chrysler "Autofare" pavilion at the 1964–65 New York World's Fair and exhibit design for the Pro Football Hall of Fame. In 1976, Johnson's grandson Robert G. Vallee Jr. began working at the company, and two years later he was assigned as the head of production.

In 1980, Vallee after being appointed account executive, was assigned to work with American Honda, one of the first foreign carmakers that the company had collaborated with. In 1985, an office was opened in Los Angeles, and with Vallee's assistance the company had assignments from clients such as Toyota and Nissan. By 1989, the work that the company had been doing in the west coast had secured as second production facility there, along with moves to seek out clients and opportunities outside the automotive industry, and experimented with developing its consulting capabilities.

=== Expansion and Digital Pioneering (1990-2010s) ===
In the beginning of the 1990s GPJ expanded with new offices in Boston, Chicago and Seattle. This was also brought along with the company winning the account of Chrysler International, leading to the openings of the first European offices in Brussels, Belgium for the agency. By this point GPJ's annual revenues were at $100 million or more, and the company had between 300 and 500 employees

March 1996 saw GPJ's main headquarters and production operation moved to Auburn Hills, Michigan to a larger 300,000-square foot facility. Many other moves followed with the administrative, sales, and design departments relocated to a new 36,000-square foot state-of-the-art paint shop and a 100,000-square foot warehouse space for storing client exhibit pieces. Additionally new offices in San Jose, California were opened to cater to the emergent computer electronics industry and contracts were won with Cisco Systems, Siebel and Intel. In that same year, Robert Vallee Jr. was promoted to the title of CEO in addition to being the company's president.

At this point, GPJ's client list included 40 Fortune 500 companies with 90% of sales deriving from the auto industry. Creation of high production visual displays for auto shows became a new hallmark for the company, with each custom made and incorporating technologies like simulated-motion and virtual reality.

By June 1998, IBM selected GPJ as its global exhibition management partner, entrusting the agency with more than 1,000 events annually. During this period, GPJ launched GlobalLINKS, one of the industry's first web-based event management platforms. In March 1999, GPJ bought a majority stake in Raumtechnik Messebau GmbH in Stuttgart, Germany and later renamed Raumtechnik Messebau & Event Marketing GmbH. Two months later the company once again bought stakes in Project Worldwide, a London-based creative communications agency. In the same year, the company also produced the North American International Auto Show (NAIAS) in Detroit with countless of automotive clients utilizing rotating turntables, cars, videos, graphics, and other special effects.

In September 2001, GPJ acquired Designtroupe, a company from Australia. This acquisition brought the company officially into the Asia-Pacific region opening offices in Sydney, Singapore, Tokyo. In the same year it acquired Conference Planners of Burlingame California, an event management company owned by CEO Chris Meyer.

A joint venture in China with Highteam Public Relations Co. Ltd. of Beijing in the fall of 2002, brought the company additional access into the developing China region. With a stronger presence in the Asia-Pacific region, GPJ played key roles in global showcases such as the 2008 Beijing Olympics and the 2010 Shanghai World Expo, where it designed pavilions for Lenovo, Cisco, and the Australian government.

=== Modernization, Digital Acceleration, and Global Reach (2010s–Present) ===
GPJ continued to expand globally, establish its first S. American entity opening an office in Brazil in 2014. opening an office in Dubai in 2022, extending its capabilities in the Middle East. Ahead of industry trends, GPJ was among the first experiential agencies to integrate digital into physical experiences, laying the groundwork for hybrid formats that would later become essential.

During the COVID-19 pandemic, GPJ rapidly transitioned events like Salesforce's Dreamforce To You into digital-first experiences. The agency also co-founded the Live For Life coalition, mobilizing over 80 live event companies to support public health infrastructure and PPE production. GPJ also designed and manufactured hundreds of COVID-19 testing modules for use in CVS drugstore properties. Under the leadership of current Global CEO Fiona Bruder and then-CEO Chris Meyer, GPJ maintained business continuity and achieved 44% year-over-year growth by 2022, outperforming industry benchmarks.

== Core Capabilities and Strategic Initiatives ==
=== Digital and Hybrid Integration ===
A pioneer in digital integration, GPJ began incorporating virtual components into physical events well before the industry-wide hybrid shift. This early investment enabled the agency to lead the shift to digital and hybrid formats during the pandemic. In partnership with Wondersauce, GPJ launched one of the industry's first open platforms for digital and hybrid events.

=== Sustainability Leadership ===
GPJ embeds sustainability into every stage of the experience lifecycle, including carbon footprint audits, ethical sourcing, and material reuse. In 2024, GPJ Germany earned ISO 20121 certification for sustainable event management. The agency also adopted the TRACE carbon calculator and established regional Green Teams. Its sustainable execution has been recognized at events like Cisco Live and by awards such as Campaign Ad Net Zero and IMEX-EIC.

=== Strategic Experience Design ===
GPJ was the first in its category to build an in-house Experience Strategy discipline. Using proprietary tools such as the Strategic Experience Mapping® methodology and the Experience Intelligence Dashboard, the agency enables insight-driven planning for measurable audience impact. The agency even holds a U.S. patent for the innovative process.

=== Talent Development ===
To foster industry-ready talent, GPJ launched the Ignite apprenticeship program, the first of its kind in the experiential space. The Ignite program is an entry-level, train-to-hire position that offers hands-on experience under the mentorship of experiential experts.

GPJ is a founding partner of Cal Poly State University's Experience Innovation Lab, an interdisciplinary program designed to prepare students for careers in experience design and marketing. As part of this partnership, GPJ made a significant investment to support the lab's creation and long-term impact to help shape the future of the experience economy. GPJ maintains a close relationship with Cal Poly's Experience Industry Management (EIM) department and actively recruits interns and full-time hires from the program.

GPJ's commitment to building a strong, inclusive culture has earned it several national honors. In 2024, Forbes recognized GPJ as one of America's Best Employers for Diversity, a Best Employer for New Grads, and one of America's Best Midsize Employers.

=== AI and Emerging Technology ===
GPJ continues to invest in AI, AR/VR, and robotics through initiatives led by its London Innovation Lab, which drives experimentation across experience design. In 2024, a new Associate Director of Decision Science role was introduced to embed data science deeper into strategic planning.

=== Sports and Entertainment Expansion ===
GPJ recognized the power of sports and entertainment to drive emotional brand engagement. In 2024, the agency launched GPJ Sports Marketing, a dedicated practice designed to connect global brands with fans through strategic sports activations, sponsorship management, and immersive fan experiences. The practice was built to integrate with GPJ's marketing capabilities, offering clients a holistic approach to sports and entertainment engagement.

In 2023, GPJ formalized the next evolution of its commitment to the space by launching the Sports, Gaming & Entertainment (SGE) Collective, broadening the agency's offerings to uplevel esports, gaming, talent booking, content strategy, and data-led fan engagement. The SGE Collective works with properties such as the Olympics, NBA, NFL, F1, and major global tours developing programs that merge brand storytelling with real-time cultural moments.

=== Fabrication and Production ===
GPJ operates the largest fabrication and graphics production footprint in experiential marketing, managing over 1,000 projects annually. With more than 1.2 million square feet of fabrication and warehouse space across facilities in Detroit, Nashville, Los Angeles, Las Vegas, and Stuttgart, GPJ provides large-format printing, scenic builds, and logistics for global events. In July 2023, a new fabrication hub opened in Las Vegas, enhancing West Coast capacity. Offerings include scenic/theatrical fabrication, modular structures, branded environments, and permanent installations—all executed with an emphasis on speed, creativity, and sustainability.
