= With Clarity =

American jewelry brand

- Industry: Retail
- Founded: 2013
- Headquarters: New York City, United States
- Number of locations: 1
- Area served: United States
- Products: Jewelry

With Clarity is an American engagement ring brand founded in 2013. It sells predominantly lab-grown diamond jewelry through its website and a store in New York City. The company offers replica rings to allow online users to try out before they buy the original.

The International Gem Society (IGS) claims that the company was the first online jewelry retailer to offer a home preview service. Its engagement rings were included in roundup lists by the New York Post, Marie Claire, Vogue, and CNN.

In 2019, it was included in Inc. magazine's top 5000 companies in the US. In 2020, the Financial Times featured With Clarity in its list of the fastest-growing American companies.

In 2024, the company partnered with the National Football League (NFL) to launch limited-edition men's wedding bands. The rings came engraved with a logo of the league's select 12 teams. With Clarity's jewelry collections have been worn by celebrities in fashion events such as the Met Gala, SAG Awards, and The Grammys.
