= Jack Strong (footballer) =

Australian rules footballer

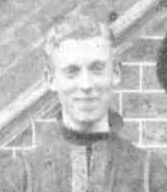

Personal information
- Full name: John Service Strong
- Born: 18 April 1884; Helensburgh, Scotland
- Died: 15 March 1971 (aged 86); Bellevue Hill, New South Wales
- Original team: Melbourne Grammar/Brunswick
- Position: Ruck/Forward

Playing career^{1}
Years	Club	Games (Goals)
1901, 1903–10, 1912	Melbourne	78 (29)
- ^{1} Playing statistics correct to the end of 1912.

John Service Strong (18 April 1884 – 15 March 1971) was an Australian rules footballer who played with Melbourne in the Victorian Football League (VFL).

Born in Scotland, Strong commenced his football career while captain of Melbourne Grammar School. He later had a prominent business career, holding positions including Chief Assistant in the Trade Commissioner Service and Australian representative of the Society of Motor Manufacturers and Traders.
