= Whisps =

American cheese based snack food

- Industry: Snack food, cheese
- Founded: 2015
- Headquarters: New York City, New York, U.S.
- Key people: John Ghingo
- Owner: Schuman Cheese (2015-2018)

Whisps is an American cheese and snack brand.

== History ==
Ilana Fischer worked for Schuman Cheese in 2015 and she started the brand with Costco. Fischer says, “That’s our mentality, our approach to the market. Who we sold to in the store where we positioned ourselves.” In 2018, they went independent.

In 2021, John Ghingo, originally from Applegate Farms became the CEO. Later they held a contest where one had to eat their product for a year, and the winner was paid $10,000. Later they came out with Cheese Crumbs and a nuts mix.

In 2023, they introduced a Buffalo flavor, and Cheese And Pretzel Bites to the product line.
