= Unpakt =

Comparative pricing and booking website for moving services

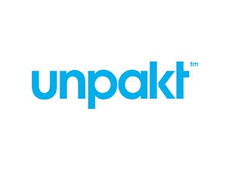
- Type: Private
- Industry: Tertiary
- Founded: 2010
- Headquarters: New York City, United States
- Area served: 47 US States
- Services: Web-site to help people find a moving company
- Number of employees: 15
- Website: unpakt.com

Unpakt is a comparative pricing and booking website for moving services. Headquartered in New York City, Unpakt launched in July 2012, offering online planning, price comparisons and booking of moving companies.

== History ==
Unpakt was founded in November 2010 by Ben-Harosh.

Unpakt was recognized as a PC Magazine Top 100 Website of 2013.
