= RTTS =

IT Company in United States

- Type: Private: S-Corp
- Industry: Software quality Test automation Outsourcing
- Founded: 1996 (as Real-Time Technology Solutions, Inc.)
- Headquarters: New York, NY
- Area served: North America
- Key people: Bill Hayduk (founder and president); Ron Axelrod (senior vice president)
- Website: rttsweb.com

RTTS (Real-Time Technology Solutions, Inc.) is a New York City-based professional services organization that provides software quality outsourcing, training, and resources for business applications. RTTS uses the software quality and test solutions from IBM, Hewlett Packard Enterprise, Microsoft and other vendors and open source tools to perform software performance testing, functional test automation, big data testing, data warehouse/ETL testing, mobile application testing, security testing and service virtualization.

== History ==
Real-Time Technology Solutions, Inc. (RTTS) was founded in New York in 1996. RTTS began by supporting test automation tools from SQA, Inc., a Boston-based publicly traded firm that specialized in the relatively new field of automated software quality (ASQ).

In 1997, Rational Software, Inc., a Cupertino, California, firm specializing in products that model and aid in software development, acquired SQA, Inc. RTTS joined the Rational value-added reseller (VAR) program.

RTTS supports testing services from Rational Software (now a part of IBM), Hewlett Packard Enterprise, Microsoft, and open source technologies such as Selenium (software), Appium (mobile testing) and Apache JMeter.

RTTS clients include Fortune 500 and small and medium-sized businesses in vertical markets that include pharmaceuticals, banking, insurance, brokerage, health care, software vendors, government agencies, media, telecommunications, professional services, retail, higher education, transportation, and entertainment.

== Services ==
Managed testing services, test planning, software performance testing, load testing, functional test automation, big data testing, data warehouse testing, business intelligence report testing, DevOps/DevTest, application security testing, exploratory testing, training services.

== Onshore Outsourcing ==
In October 2003 RTTS started an on-shore outsourced testing service that provides software quality and automated testing services using American programmers working out of offices in the US. The model differs from offshoring since engineers work in a similar time zone with no language barriers and no visa issues. It has been rebranded as Testing in the Cloud.

== Software ==
In 2008, RTTS spun off TOMOS Software, LLC. TOMOS is software as a service (SaaS) for Application lifecycle management. TOMOS is role-based, with roles defined for project manager, business analyst, developer and tester. TOMOS has modules for requirements management, test authoring, a test execution engine, defect tracking, version/build management, and collaboration.

In 2010, RTTS began work on an enterprise test tool for data testing. QuerySurge was released in early 2012. QuerySurge automates big data testing, data warehouse and ETL testing, data interface testing, data migration testing and database upgrade testing.

== Awards ==
- Listed No. 962 on Inc. Magazine’s Inc. 5000 list in 2024.
- Named 2009 voke Innovator by voke, Inc.
- Named Gartner Cool Vendor in Application Development, 2009, for application lifecycle management platform
