= Alling and Cory =

American printing paper and packaging distributor

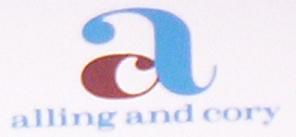

Alling and Cory was a privately owned printing paper and packaging distributor headquartered in Rochester, New York, United States. Founded by Elihu Francis Marshall (1794–1840) in 1819, the company was the first paper merchant in the U.S. The company remained independent until 1996 when it was bought by Union Camp. Assumed to be among its employees was Millard Fillmore President of the United States and Washington Hunt, governor of New York.

At its height, Alling and Cory owned more than 20 branch offices from Toledo, Ohio to New York City. At one point, it was the United States' oldest privately owned company in continuous operation. In 1910–1911, they built the Alling & Cory Buffalo Warehouse and in 2010, it was listed on the National Register of Historic Places. It merged with Antietam Paper Co. in 1997. After the International Paper acquisition of Union Camp in 1999, Alling and Cory was folded into xpedx Corp. Most of its original branches remain open.
