= Partners & Napier =

Rochester, New York-based advertising agency

- Type: Private
- Founded: 2004
- Headquarters: Rochester, New York, U.S.
- Number of locations: 3
- Area served: United States, Global
- Key people: Sharon Napier (founder, executive chair); Courtney Cotrupe (CEO); Rob Kottkamp (CCO); Jennifer Rees (CFO)
- Owner: Project WorldWide
- Number of employees: 160
- Parent: Project Worldwide
- Website: www.partnersandnapier.com

Partners & Napier (stylized as Partners + Napier) is a full-service creative and media advertising agency. According to the company, they have significant expertise in travel/tourism, food/beverage, restaurants, health/wellness, and B2B marketing. Major clients include Royal Caribbean, Checkers & Rally's, Constellation Brands (High West Whiskey, Pacifico, Modelo, and more), MD Live, and Wegmans. The agency is headquartered in Rochester, New York, with additional field offices in New York City and Boston.

== History ==
Partners + Napier was created in 2004 when CEO Sharon Napier and three partners, including CFO Jim DiNoto and CCO Jeff Gabel, purchased the Rochester, New York and Atlanta, Georgia offices of Wolf Group Integrated Communications, an agency based in Toronto, Ontario; the three were all Rochester-based regional executives with Wolf Group who took action when founder and chairman Larry Wolf decided to shut down the firm.

The agency was the founding member of the Partners Group, an interdependent collective of North American agencies formed in 2006, consisting of Partners & Napier, Partners and Jeary and Partners and Edell. The collective was dissolved after Partners and Jeary and Partners and Edell were acquired.

In 2011, Partners + Napier was acquired by Project Worldwide, an independent and employee-owned holding company consisting of thirteen agencies based in Auburn Hills, Michigan. Partners + Napier became an ESOP when it was acquired by Project Worldwide, and continues to be 100% employee-owned.

== Notable campaigns ==
- Royal Caribbean "It's Big Time"
- Smashburger "Smashed It"
- Delta Vacations "Vacation Harder"
- MD Live "now. that's better."
- The Strong National Museum of Play "Path to Play"
- Highmark Health "Blue Hen"

== Achievements ==
Partners + Napier has received multiple honors from the Effie organization, including being twice ranked among the Top 20 Most Effective Agencies in North America. Recent Effie wins include three awards at the 2022 North American Effie Awards (Performance Media, Healthcare, and Small Budgets); a 2019 Bronze Effie for BurgerFi's "Burgers for Every 1" campaign; and a 2017 Silver Shopper Marketing Effie for Friendship Dairies' ShopRite "Mix-In Matchmaker" campaign. The agency's "Blue Hen" campaign for Highmark Blue Cross Blue Shield Delaware earned a Gold Effie in 2018 and was named a Grand Effie finalist. Since first entering the competition in 2015, the agency has accumulated more than a dozen Effie recognitions across clients and categories.

Partners + Napier has also won two Jay Chiat Awards for brand strategy including a gold medal in 2024 for its The Strong National Museum of Play campaign; and in 2023 it won a silver medal for its Ace Valley cannabis product launch.

The agency has been honored at the Clio Cannabis Awards, including a silver award in 2023 for "Ace Valley: Lust & Thrust," along with shortlist recognition for branding work on Ace Valley and DOJA.

In 2025, Partners + Napier won two Gold MUSE Creative Awards for design work, including for "Keepr Brand Identity" (Corporate Identity) and for "To Kalon Collective Sales Kit" (Marketing & Promotional).

The agency's See Art campaign for the Rochester Contemporary Art Center was featured in a Communication Arts exhibit in 2025, and Partners + Napier has also been a platinum winner in the Graphis Advertising Annual. Partners + Napier's creative work has also been featured in the Lürzer's Archive showcase.

In 2025 the agency won a National Silver ADDY for the Modelo Aguas Frescas Sell-In Kit (Constellation Brands).

== See also ==
- Amalgamated Advertising
