= Honeysuckle Media =

American media company

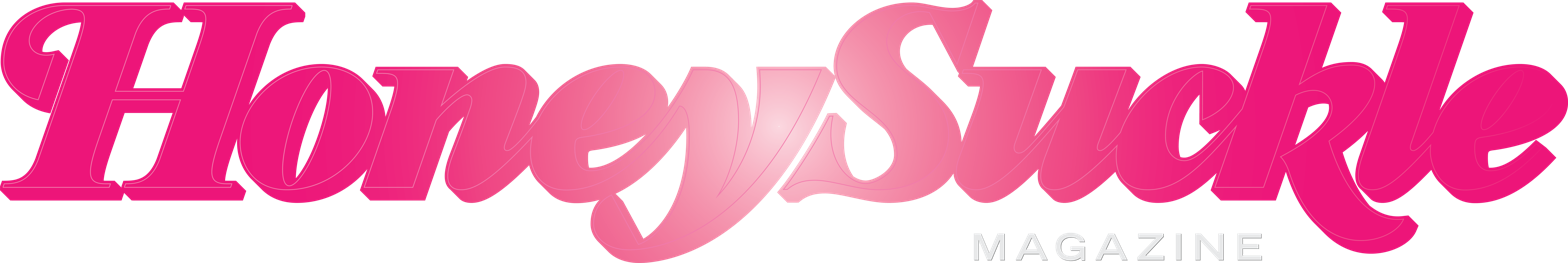
- Honeysuckle Media (Magazine) identification logo used till date
- Type: Privately held company
- Industry: Digital content creation
- Founded: 2013; 13 years ago in Detroit, Michigan
- Founder: Ronit Pinto
- Headquarters: New York
- Area served: Worldwide
- Website: https://honeysucklemag.com/

Honeysuckle Media, Inc. is an American media company based in New York that publishes print and digital content. The company is known for its coverage and advocacy on cannabis rights.

== History ==
Honeysuckle was founded in 2013 in Detroit as a web-only publication. It started to release print editions in 2018. The company garnered attention for its coverage of the legal cannabis industry and legalization movements, being named by Green Market Report as one of the top Cannabis publications in 2021.

Honeysuckle regularly publishes first-person accounts from marginalized communities and incarcerated or formerly incarcerated citizens. Several stories have examined conditions within the American criminal justice system. In 2020, Honeysuckle published an article on the case of California inmate DaReta Gail Steverson, who suffered from leukemia and COVID-19 and was deemed ineligible for parole despite her need of medical treatment.

== Controversy ==
On June 16, 2024, the company's founders, Sam Long and Ronit Pinto, were involved in a violent altercation with three women on the Upper West Side of Manhattan. Footage of the incident was subsequently posted to social media.

Due to the incident, Cannabiziac, a cannabis brand, removed Pinto from their advisory board. The Travel Agency, a New York cannabis chain, also "sever[ed] all ties with Honeysuckle Magazine."

== Cannabis ==
Honeysuckle has spearheaded numerous initiatives to educate mainstream culture about the cannabis and hemp industries. The company launched the first campaign to display cannabis brands on Times Square billboards for the first time in history on December 31, 2018. Fifteen partner brands were featured, including Dasheeda Dawson of The WeedHead™, the first African American owner of a cannabis company to be showcased in that space. In 2021, in partnership with rapper Lil Wayne's cannabis brand GKUA, Honeysuckle highlighted six women-owned companies on Times Square's Thomson Reuters board. Featuring all-female and BIPOC brands and honoring the 50th anniversary of National Cannabis Day, the campaign included Idaho-based Tribal Hemp & Cannabis Magazine from the Indigenous Cannabis Coalition and Ontario-based Legacy 420, a First Nations retailer.

Billboard Campaigns

Since 2018, Honeysuckle has spearheaded various billboard campaigns in Times Square and other locations that have furthered cannabis and human rights causes in notable ways.

- Epic 420 New York (2023), multiple New York activations during the 420 week, including a Times Square campaign with Cannabis Now and Royal Queen Seeds, marking the first time a European-owned cannabis brand has been featured on the platform.
- Indigenous Cannabis 420 (2022), the second international Indigenous cannabis collaboration and the first campaign uniting five tribal nations in activations across New York State.
- Indigenous Peoples Day (2022), the first multimedia blitz across New York State to honor Governor Kathy Hochul's formal recognition of Indigenous Peoples Day, including the first cannabis-themed cab toppers.
- Indigenous Peoples Day (2021), the first Times Square campaign to officially honor Indigenous Peoples Day as President Joe Biden formally recognized the holiday.
- Diversity in Cannabis with Lil Wayne (2021), a salute to women and BIPOC-owned brands that featured the first international Indigenous cannabis collaboration.
- Celebrate Plant Medicine (2021), the first psychedelics-themed billboard initiative in Times Square's history, a collaboration with four women-owned brands including Honeysuckle, DoubleBlind Magazine, Susan Rockefeller's Musings Magazine, and Rainbo Mushrooms.

== Awards ==
Clio Cannabis Awards

- Bronze Winner, Print and Out of Home: "The Empress State" (2022)
- Bronze Winner, Print and Out of Home: "Girls Are Playas Too" (2023)
- Bronze Winner, Brand Design / Brand Identity: MNML collaboration / "Honeysuckle Magazine: The Premier Cannabis Culture Magazine" (2023)
- Clio Shortlist, Partnerships & Collaborations: "The Limitless Dreams of New York's CAURD Licensees" (2023)

Other awards

- Best Cannabis Magazine, New York Cannabis Music Awards (August 2024)
- Cannabis Industry Power Player (Ronit Pinto), AMNY and Politics NY (2023 and 2024)
- Publication of the Year, CelebStoner (2023)
- Women's Leadership Award in Media (Ronit Pinto), Green Market Report (April 2022)
- Industry Era Women Leaders, 10 Most Successful Women Entrepreneurs in 2021 (Ronit Pinto)

Honeysuckle's social justice reportage received a New York State Assembly Citation from Assemblymember Inez E. Dickens of the 70th District, for "significant contribution to the culture and community" of New York City. The publication also received a New York State Senate Citation in 2019 from then-Senator Brian Benjamin of the state's 30th District for taking "a progressive stance on social and economic issues."
