= R.H. Hooper & Company =

- Industry: financial
- Founder: Joseph C. Monier; Clifford M. Story
- Defunct: June 18, 1930
- Fate: insolvency

R.H. Hooper & Cooper & Company was the name used by two stock traders, Joseph C. Monier and Clifford M. Story, before they were suspended from the New York Cotton Exchange on June 18, 1930. The company was reportedly insolvent by June 18, 1930, announcing its intention to liquidate its debts entirely.

== Lawsuit ==
R.H. Hooper & Company filed suit against Guaranty Trust Company on July 18, 1932, for damages of $1,549,040. This was because the bank refused to honor three checks it had written. Contrary to initial reports, R.H. Hooper & Company contended it maintained a credit balance with Guaranty Trust totaling $72,000. Monier and Story claimed that their suspension from the cotton exchange was caused by the refusal to recognize the checks.

In May 1936 the United States Supreme Court denied a review of Guaranty Trust of New York, which involved R.H. Hooper & Company. The Supreme Court annulled a decision made by a lower court which ordered to trial an R.H. Hooper & Company damage suit against Guaranty Trust. The bank refused to honor checks in the amount of $43,000. The suit sought $1,500,000, alleging that damages which could not be remedied were caused the business, when Guaranty Trust refused to honor the checks.
