= Skooba Design =

American design and manufacturing company

- Type: Private
- Industry: Technology accessories
- Founded: 1999
- Founder: Michael Hess
- Headquarters: Buffalo, New York, United States
- Products: Carrying cases, laptop bags, electronic accessories
- Owner: Tom Sperazza, CEO Norazza, Inc.
- Number of employees: 10+
- Parent: Norazza, Inc.
- Website: Skooba Design

Skooba Design is an American company which designs and manufactures carrying cases and accessories.

Founded in Rochester, New York in 1999 by Michael Hess, the company's products include laptop, iPad/tablet, photo/video bags, and other laptop-compatible luggage. It offers its products primarily online.

== History ==
Hess founded the company in Rochester, New York in 1999 as a subsidiary of Three Point Ventures, LLC. It was founded under the name RoadWired, and changed its name to Skooba Design in August 2007.

In 2014, Skooba was bought by Buffalo, New York manufacturer and distributor, Norazza, Inc. Norazza, Inc.'s acquisition of Skooba allowed for large-scale distribution of the company's products. Norazza, Inc. also bought Skooba's sister company HotDog Yoga in the deal. Skooba products are made in the United States.
