= Dorm Company Corporation =

DormCo
- Founded: Buffalo, New York, United States (2010)
- Founder: Jeff Gawronski
- Headquarters: Buffalo, New York, United States
- Products: College supplies
- Website: www.dormco.com

Dorm Company Corporation, also known as DormCo, is an American online retailer headquartered in Nashville, TN that specializes in products for college students and dorm rooms. The company was founded in March 2010 by Jeff Gawronski.

== History ==
In 1999, Gawronski invented and built a product called the Bed Post Shelf and sold these as dorm items to incoming college freshman. The idea behind the Bed Post Shelf was to provide a shelf to college students sleeping on the top bunk.

After selling the Bed Post Shelf to incoming college students, Gawronski attempted to bring the Bed Post Shelf to market to large retailers, but after some roadblocks, started his own website selling college supplies in 2006. The original dorm products company ousted Gawronski in April 2009 and Gawronski re-launched as Dorm Company Corporation in March 2010.

In 2011, DormCo had $1.2 million in revenue, which increased with 2013 revenue at $4 million and 3-year growth of 405%. In 2014, DormCo was listed as #1098 on Inc. 5000's list of the fastest-growing privately held companies. DormCo has also been featured by several media outlets, including The Today Show, Seventeen magazine, Oprah, MSN News, and Family Circle.

== Industry ==
Recent trends show that more college students and families are using online retailers for back to school shopping, with 35.6% of families planning to shop online. With total spending for college reaching $43.1 billion in 2015, college students are changing their dorm-room decor needs. In recent years, college students are increasing the amount they spend on matching bedding, curtains, and other dorm-room supplies with an average of $126.30 per student being spent on dorm-room decor and dorm supplies, a figure that is up 30% from $96.70 in 2014.

== Products ==
DormCo provides dorm supplies for college students, including bedding, compact-storage options, trunks, rugs, seating, and decorations. They also have a gift registry and wish list that allows students to share what they need with family and friends.

== Acquisitions and investments ==
In October 2013 DormCo purchased Primo Lights, a company that offers Christmas and Craft Lighting for all occasions. DormCo has also partnered with College-Ave, which sells DormCo's dorm supplies through their web store.

== Related ventures ==
In August 2009, Gawronski launched Yak About It, a website for inventors to advertise their inventions by participating in daily/weekly competitions. The website was featured in Entrepreneur Magazine, but the initiative was unsuccessful and the site currently sits dormant.
