= E.W. Holbrook & Company =

E. W. Holbrook & Company was a New York City dry goods firm which became bankrupt in July 1883. Located at 51 Leonard Street, near Broadway (Manhattan), in Lower Manhattan, the business was among the most well-known of its kind. The company, led by Edwin W. Holbrook and three other directors, was in debt in the amount of $750,000 The failure was attributed to losses involved in the operation of its three cotton mills. Holbrook also lost $500,000 on Wall Street (Manhattan) in speculation. During the week of E.W. Holbrook & Company's insolvency, 162 other firms in the United States failed.

== Director mismanaged finances ==
Holbrook owned Grafton Mill at Grafton, Massachusetts. He was president of the Springvale Mill Company of Springvale, Maine. He was also one of the principal officers of the National City Bank, a director of the Delaware, Lackawanna and Western Railroad, Western Railroad, and a member of the Union League.

As an insider with the Delaware, Lackawanna and Western Railroad, Holbrook once profited by purchasing its stock for $80 a share and made a profit of $100,000. This led him into risky ventures as a margin (finance) buyer, and he extended his business operations on margins. When stock prices declined in the days prior to insolvency, Holbrook was unable to pay $40,000 which he owed stockbrokers.

== Corporation history ==
E.W. Holbrook & Company was founded in Boston, Massachusetts under the name Clarke, Holbrook & Floyd. Clarke retired in January 1865, and afterward the firm was called Holbrook, Floyd & Company. It became E.W. Holbrook & Company in 1868.

The dry goods concern leased the Empire Mills in Troy, New York, from which it purchased a considerable amount in machinery. The company maintained two bank accounts, with National City Bank and Central National Bank. E.W. Holbrook & Company owed no money to National City Bank.
