= General Laundry Machine =

Laundry Machine Firm

General Laundry Machine was a Troy, New York firm which became a casualty of the financial collapse during the Great Depression. It failed as a result of the impact of the nationwide economic decline in the United States, in the 1930s.

== Company history ==
The company was formed in June 1927 from a merger of the Tolhurst Machine Works and the Wiley-Ellis Company. Tolhurst corporation was started in 1852 and was based in Troy and Green Island, New York. Wiley-Ellis was founded in 1889 and maintained properties in Chicago, Illinois and Columbia, Pennsylvania.

General Laundry Machine acquired the primary assets of the Paramount Laundry Machine Company of New York City in December 1929. The takeover was made possible by an exchange of stock. It brought about satisfactory economies of operations through the combination of the sales forces of the two companies.

In May 1931 the corporation's assets exceeded its liabilities, yet it became insolvent because it was unable to pay its debts as they came due.

== See also ==
- Troy Laundry
