= Outgrow.me =

Defunct online company in New York

outgrow.me
- Website type: eCommerce
- Available in: English
- Owner: Shlomo Fellig
- Website: outgrow-me-online.myshopify.com
- Registration: Optional
- Launched: June 2012; 14 years ago
- Current status: Inactive

Outgrow.me was an online marketplace for products that was successfully funded through various crowdfunding platforms. The company is based in New York.

In 2013, Time selected it as one of the fifty best websites of 2013.
