= Sofro Restaurant Corporation =

The Sofro Restaurant Corporation was a 1930s Manhattan business, which had offices at 51 Chambers Street. The business was incorporated in September 1931 with Max Rosoff as president.

== Dedication of founder ==
Rosoff was a famous New York City restaurateur who founded Rosoff's Restaurant and Rosoff's Hotel, both located at 147 West 43rd Street, near Times Square. He came to the United States from Russia as an orphan at the age of twelve. He began his career as a druggist's helper and then became a salami slicer at an East Side delicatessen, sleeping on a cot in the store to save money. He opened his first restaurant on Graham Avenue in Brooklyn at the age of nineteen. In 1905 he moved his establishment to 6th Avenue, opposite the Hippodrome Theatre. He moved again in 1918 to a site formerly occupied by the Metropole Hotel. Rosoff died of a stroke in Great Neck, New York on May 6, 1962.

== Business chronology ==
The Sofro Restaurant Corporation purchased $1,000 of 1939 New York World's Fair bond debentures in January 1937.

The firm leased property at 152 West 44th Street for a period of five years beginning on November 1, 1932, with a monthly rental of $916.66. The lease was renegotiated for a term of five years starting on July 1, 1934, with an annual rental of $12,500. The rental property included the ground, basement, and second floors of 152 West 44th Street.
