= AERCO International =

AERCO International, Inc.
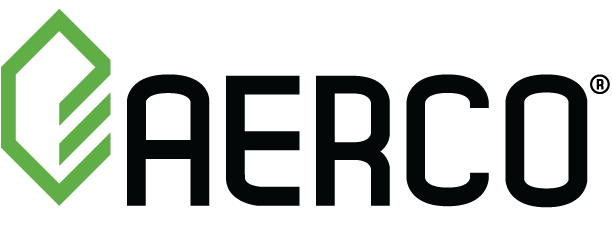
- Company type: Subsidiary
- Industry: HVAC/Plumbing
- Founded: 1949
- Founder: Henry W. Angelery
- Headquarters: 100 Oritani Drive; Blauvelt, New York, 10913
- Products: Commercial manufacturer and supplier of Boilers, Water Heating equipment, and Energy recovery Systems.
- Number of employees: Approximately 200

AERCO International, Inc. is a manufacturer and supplier of commercial condensing boilers, high efficiency water heating equipment and energy recovery systems in the HVAC/plumbing industry across a variety of markets including education, lodging, government, office buildings, healthcare, industrial and multifamily housing. In 1949, AERCO introduced the industry's first semi-instantaneous, tankless steam-to-water water heater. In 1988, AERCO introduced the first condensing and fully modulating boiler and water heater to the commercial market. The company develops rapid water heating products and a product line that achieves 99% efficiency.

== Location ==
The company's headquarters is in Blauvelt, New York, about twenty-five miles (40 km) north of New York City. AERCO currently employs 180 people.

== History ==
Henry Angelery founded AERCO in 1949 with the purpose of delivering on-demand temperature controlled water heating without storage.

In 1949, AERCO introduced a design for an indirect-fired water heater which has become the industry standard for today's water heaters. This design allows the water to be heated on demand at a controlled temperature without storage.

In 1988, AERCO became the first U.S. manufacturer to offer a fully modulating and condensing commercial gas fired water heaters. This design coordinates the boiler's output to current demand, aiming to ensure that the boiler does not draw more than the necessary amount of fuel. After its release, AERCO promptly extended this design into the hydronic boiler marketplace.

In 2014, AERCO was acquired by Watts Water Technologies for $264.5 million.

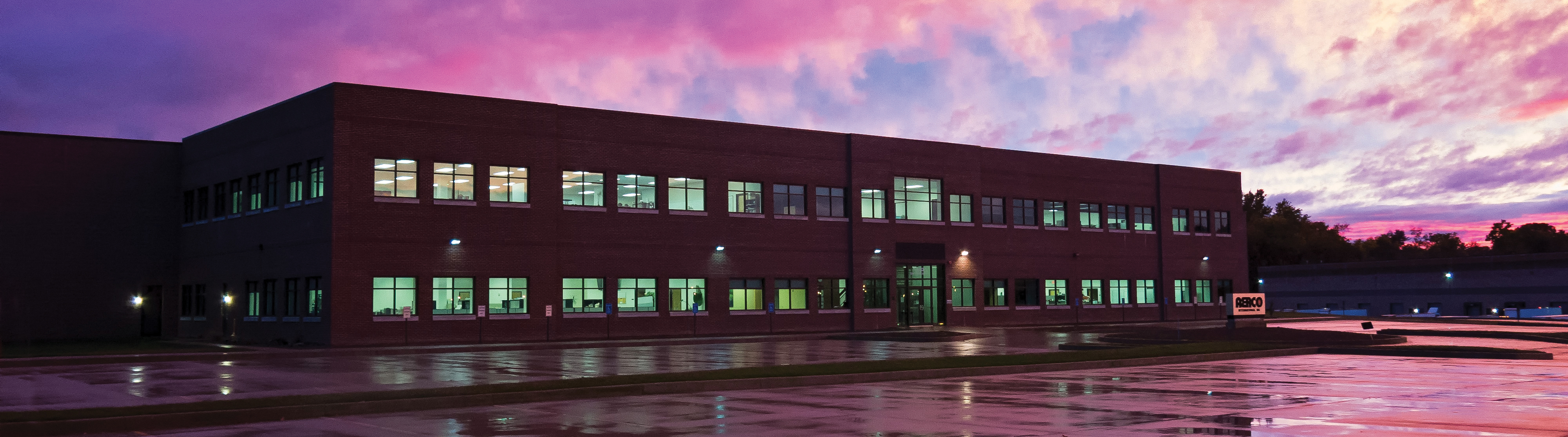
AERCO Headquarters located in Blauvelt, NY.

== Awards ==
In 2004 AERCO received Frost & Sullivan's Best Practices Award for Technology Leadership in the field of high-efficiency heating in the 10-200 boiler horsepower (BHP) market space.
