= Cohen's Fashion Optical =

Optical retailer featuring fashion products

- Industry: Retail
- Founded: 1924; 102 years ago in New York City, United States
- Founder: Jack Cohen
- Headquarters: New York City, New York, United States
- Products: Contact lenses, eyeglasses, frames, lenses sunglasses
- Website: cohensfashionoptical.com

Cohen's Fashion Optical (formerly known as Cohen's Optical) is an optical retailer headquartered in New York City featuring fashion products such as eyeglasses, frames and sunglasses, lenses, contact lenses, and accessories. Professional eye exams are usually available with on-site Doctors of Optometry.

== History ==
The company was founded by Jack Cohen in New York City. He initially sold glasses from a pushcart before establishing the first retail store in 1927 on Delancey Street and Orchard Street in the Lower East Side neighborhood.

Brothers Robert Cohen and Alan Cohen took control of the business in 1978. They began franchising the company in 1979. In 1992, Cohen's Fashion Optical paid $15 million to acquire Sterling Optical out of bankruptcy. Soon after, the business was renamed Emerging Vision and spun off. The Cohen family continued to run the company.

In 1993, the chain had opened a location in Tashkent, Uzbekistan. By this time, Cohen's Fashion Optical had expanded to 104 stores in the Northeast United States and Florida.

On March 3, 2008, Houchens Industries completed its acquisition of Cohen's with hopes of expanding the regional optical retail chain into a national chain. President Robert Cohen remained at the company to continue overseeing operations. The company had 106 franchised stores at the time. By 2010, there were 117 stores in seven states and Puerto Rico.

For the company's 85th anniversary in 2016, Cohen's revamped its first store, modernized its website, and introduced an online content hub. By this point, there were 130 franchise stores.

== Products ==
Cohen's Fashion Optical sells prescription and non-prescription eyeglasses and sunglasses from major fashion brands. The company introduced a private label collection in 2016. It also offers contact lenses and on-premise eye examinations.
