= Togglethis =

togglethis
- Type: Private
- Founded: 1996 - 2001
- Headquarters: New York
- Key people: Paul Maya; Marc Singer

togglethis was a company founded in 1996 by Paul Maya and Marc Singer. It merged the concepts of MOO/MUD and Choose Your Own Adventure to create some of the earliest, consumer-facing graphic avatars on the internet. Their interactive character technology laid the groundwork for later virtual reality companies like There and Second Life.

The company was part of the NYC Silicon Alley community, being named one of '@NY's 25' companies in 1997 and 1998. The founders were named one of the Silicon Alley Reporter's 100 Internet Industry Executives in 1997–1999.

togglethis was primarily known for its original animated character, Bozlo Beaver. Bozlo was created to showcase togglethis' Interactive Character technology (IC Technology). Bozlo was sent via weekly emails to subscribers' computers. In every episode Bozlo came onto the desktop and insisted that the user was invading HIS desktop. Bozlo devised ways to get you to leave your computer. In one episode Bozlo brought with him angry document files that chased your cursor around the screen. In other episodes, Bozlo brought you a gift that turned out to be a bomb; you and Bozlo played a game of hot potato until one of you exploded. In 1997 Warner Bros. licensed Bozlo and the IC Technology. Bozlo was distributed at Warner Bros. Online.

In addition to Bozlo Beaver, togglethis had promoted film, television and brand advertisers using its IC Technology. Clients included The Walt Disney Company, ABC, New Line Cinemas, NBC, BMW, and Coca-Cola. The campaign for Austin Powers, The Spy Who Shagged Me was seen by over 750,000 people and featured an interactive Austin powers that trained the user on how to be a successful international man of mystery.

Many of the togglethis characters were animated by Colorado based artist Gwenda Kaczor.

== See also ==
- Silicon Alley
- Dot-com company
