= Wooter =

American sportswear company

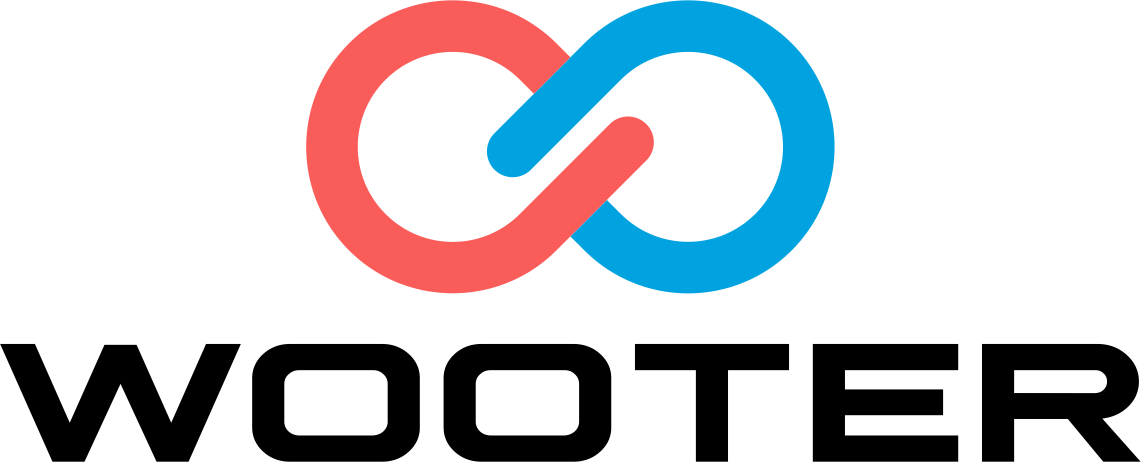
- Company type: Private
- Industry: Sportswear
- Founded: June 2014
- Headquarters: Staten Island, New York, United States
- Area served: Worldwide
- Products: Sports uniforms and apparel
- Services: Digital sports league management platform
- Website: wooter.com

Wooter is an American sports technology and athletic apparel company based in Staten Island, New York. Wooter provides customizable sports uniforms and operates a digital platform for sports league management.

Wooter has created apparel for boxer Floyd Mayweather, musicians Master P and Snoop Dogg, and former NFL and NBA players such as Chad Johnson, Terrell Owens, and Matt Barnes.

== History ==
Wooter was founded in 2014 by Alex Aleksandrovski, David Kleyman, and Alex Kagan. The name "Wooter" is derived from the exclamations "woo" and "woot" expressing excitement.

In 2015, Wooter raised $250,000 in a seed funding round. By the late 2010s, Wooter was producing apparel for events associated with athletes such as Kawhi Leonard and Floyd Mayweather. In 2016, Wooter was included in Entrepreneur's "100 Brilliant Companies" list and launched Wooter Apparel.

In 2019, Wooter pledged $2.5 million in apparel to youth sports programs over a three-year period.

During the COVID-19 pandemic, Wooter launched CovCare, a division that supplied personal protective equipment (PPE) and donated face masks to hospitals in a joint initiative with Project Protect.

In 2021, Wooter formed a joint initiative with the National Federation of State High School Associations (NFHS). That same year, Wooter began accepting cryptocurrency, including Dogecoin, as a form of payment. Wooter also expanded its youth sponsorship initiative, committing to donate up to $10 million in sportswear over three years, building on a $2.5 million program started in 2019.

== Operations ==
Wooter is a privately held company headquartered in Staten Island, New York. It designs and manufactures customizable sports uniforms and apparel for over 250 product categories, using manufacturing techniques such as sublimation.

In addition to apparel, Wooter provides a digital league management platform. The software enables sports organizations to create custom mobile applications and websites to manage schedules, statistics, and player profiles.

== Community impact ==
In 2017, Wooter founded Wooter Africa, a non-profit that organizes youth basketball leagues in East Africa. Wooter has also partnered with and sponsored other community sports programs, including Each One Teach One at Rucker Park, Ballin' 4 Peace, Smush Parker’s Basketball Camp, and youth events with the NFL Alumni Association. It also provided custom jerseys for the Balling 4 Lupus charity basketball game, supporting the Lupus Foundation of America.
