= Paris Decorators Corporation =

The Paris Decorators Corporation was founded in 1911 and operated a chain of nine furnishing stores in the metropolitan New York City area. The business specialized in curtains, interior decoration products, draperies, and furniture. It was based in Newark, New Jersey but maintained its general office and factory at 28 West 23rd Street. Among its principal competitors in the 1930s retail business was Mrs. Dodd, Inc., located in Manhattan.

== Company history ==
In July 1933 the Paris Decorators Corporation doubled its Broad Street space. The property ran from 23 - 30 West 23rd Street through to 22nd Street. It crossed through space leased by the Rosenberg-Murray Company and Harry Theons & Co. The company discontinued making purchases in Germany in September 1933, and closed its German office at the same time. This was because of the ascendancy of Adolf Hitler and the beginning of the repressive Third Reich regime.

In 1936, the company's president, Gabriel Haber, appointed the Franklin Bruck Advertising Agency to handle its account. It was then that the firm first began to advertise in newspapers. A campaign was launched employing three New York City newspapers and direct mailing.

On August 20, 1937 the Rosenberg, Murray Company, Inc., negotiated the lease of 30,000 square feet (2,800 m^{2}) of space at 151-63 West 26th Street, for the Paris Decorators Corporation. The property included two floors.

Herbert Lloyd Jay was appointed advertising and promotion manager for the company effective February 1, 1948. In April 1948 the retailer leased a floor at 245 West 67th Street.

Following the 1953 Christmas holiday season, Paris Decorators introduced a new polish which could be used on wood and leather portions of furniture. It was effective in removing spots from surfaces. It was sold at the chain's location at 417 Fifth Avenue, among others.

The retailer leased its warehouse, which measured 18,500 square feet (1,720 m^{2}), to Mancony Warehouses, Inc., in August 1960. The lessee was a subsidiary of the B. Manichewitz Company. The deal for the 2200 Folin Street warehouse was brokered by Goldberg-Kornspun Associates, Inc. The title was insured by the Title Guarantee Company.
