= Kohler Kitchen & Bath =

Plumbing fixtures manufacturer

- Type: Division
- Founded: 1927
- Founder: John Michael Kohler
- Headquarters: Kohler, Wisconsin, United States
- Key people: Hugh Ekberg, Group President
- Products: Plumbing fixtures, toilets, toilet seats, sink faucets, bathroom sinks, kitchen accessories
- Parent: Kohler Company
- Subsidiaries: Sterling, Robern, Kallista, Ann Sacks
- Website: www.us.kohler.com

Kohler Kitchen & Bath, a division of the Kohler Company, manufactures kitchen and bath plumbing fixtures. The Kohler Kitchen & Bath Group has locations in Wisconsin, Pennsylvania, Oregon, Canada, and France.

== Subsidiaries ==
Robern

Robern, a subsidiary of Kohler since 1995, manufactures cabinets, mirrors, vanities and bathroom lighting. Robern is headquartered in Bristol, Pennsylvania.

Kallista

Established in 1979 in San Francisco, California, Kallista manufactures designer faucets, sinks, consoles, whirlpools and cabinets.

Hytec

Based in Armstrong British Columbia, Hytec Manufacturing was purchased by the Kohler Company in 1987, when it became Hytec Plumbing Products, a division of Kohler Canada Company. Hytec manufactures gelcoat and acrylic bathtubs, showers, and shower receptors.

Kohler Mira

The Kohler Company also owns Kohler Mira Ltd, a plumbing company based in Cheltenham, Gloucestershire known for its brand of Mira showers, the second most popular shower brand in the United Kingdom behind Triton Showers. Kohler bought Mira Showers in 2011.

Jacob Delafon

Jacob Delafon, acquired by the Kohler Company in 1986, manufactures baths, showers, sinks, bathtubs, and shower enclosures. In 2003, the name of Jacob Delafon became Kohler France.

Sterling Plumbing

Sterling Plumbing produces shower doors, baths, showers, sink faucets, toilets, kitchen accessories, toilet seats, and bathroom wash basin.

== See also ==
- Reece Group
- Twyford Bathrooms
