= Mrs. John L. Strong =

American privately held luxury company

Mrs. John L. Strong is a privately held American luxury company and manufacturer of custom papers and stationery. Founded in 1929 by Mrs. John L. (Flora) Strong, the company has created papers and custom luxury products for seven presidential families, royal houses, prominent members of international society, film stars and celebrities.

Mrs. Strong offers hand-engraving to its clients. Mrs. Strong's bespoke products display a range of crafts which are rarely used by others in the industry, including hand engraving of dies in steel, hand-stamping of dies, hand-mixing of custom varnish inks, hand-beveling and bordering, and hand-lining of envelopes. Mrs. Strong creates its own 100% cotton archival quality papers in its signature color "Strong's Vanilla" based on Mrs. Strong's original formulas.

== History ==
Mrs. John L. Strong (née Flora Feldstein) established her eponymous firm in the aftermath of the stock market crash of 1929. Joining forces with her sister, the owner of a luxury trousseau shop called Bournefield Linens, Mrs. Strong began selling wedding and social papers to New York's elite from Bournefield's location at 57th Street and Fifth Avenue.

Mrs. Strong's business soon outstripped the space at Bournefield, and she moved her location twice, first to 714 Madison Avenue, and later to the landmark 699 Madison Avenue, originally built as a New York home for the firm Fortnum & Mason, where the firm remains with a fifth floor atelier for private clients and a duplex ground floor boutique.

Mrs. Strong joined the "Street of Shops" on the first floor at Henri Bendel's in the 1950s. Mrs. Strong also sold through Gump's Department store in San Francisco. From her locations Mrs. Strong created papers for the Duke of Windsor and Duchess of Windsor, Barbara Hutton, the Rockefeller, Astor, Vanderbilt, and DuPont families, as well as Bette Davis, Diana Vreeland, Jacqueline Bouvier Kennedy, Barbara Paley, and other icons of style.

After the death of Mrs. Strong in 1979, the firm was sold by Strong's heirs to Robert and Joy Lewis.

In 2002, the company was purchased by financier Jeffrey Lubin and his wife, designer Nannette Brown.

On May 21, 2009, Nannette Brown announced that she would close the business. On September 29, 2009, Crain's New York Business reported that the brand had been purchased in an auction (after filing for Chapter 11 protection in the Southern District of New York in August) by Houston-based private equity firm J.P. Kotts & Co.

== Sources ==
Flora Strong, Born 28 July 1896, died New York March, 1979.

Source: Social Security Death Index, http://ssdi.rootsweb.com/cgi-bin/ssdi.cgi

Roosevelt, Eisenhower, Kennedy, Johnson, Nixon, Bush, and Clinton, Source: MJLS Archives, NYC

Papers have been made for members of the Royal Houses of Great Britain, Greece, and Jordan, as well as various Princely Houses. Source: MJLS Archives, NYC Vogue, Conde Nast Publications, May 2006 AIA Guide to New York
