= Maco (toy company) =

American Toy Company

Maco Toys, Inc., was the name of a popular toy company based in Brooklyn, New York which produced war-themed toys for children in the 1950s and 1960s. Their toys were sold in a catalog that was illustrated by Tony Tallarico and printed by Charlton Comics which presented itself as a war comic book. (These toys were also sold in toy stores.) Products included plastic guns (including the M1903 Springfield rifle and an Army Paratrooper Carbine), grenades, and a plastic Molotov cocktail.

The company's products were available in stores throughout the United States, but had a limited range of products and did not operate in other countries. Competitors included Hawk Model Company, Applause Inc, and Louis Marx and Company.

== Anti gun toy controversy ==
In 1955, the New York City Council passed a bill to ban the manufacture, sale or possession of imitation revolvers that resemble the real article too closely. In a debate about the measure, an Army .45 caliber automatic manufactured by Maco was used as an example of a toy gun which was similar enough to the real model to be used as a weapon in a robbery.
