= 10x Management =

Talent management company based in New York City

- Company type: Private
- Industry: Technology
- Founder: Michael Solomon and Rishon Blumberg
- Headquarters: 39 W. 32nd St., Suite 1403 New York, NY 10001
- Website: https://www.10xmanagement.com/

10x Management LLC is a talent management company based in New York City, with an additional office in San Francisco.

== History ==
10x Management was founded in 2001 when Altay Guvench, a musician and programmer, was approached by Michael Solomon and Rishon Blumberg to help negotiate a deal as a programmer. The founders are former entertainment industry managers. That was the moment when they realized that the next rock stars were likely to be tech stars, which made them starting a new company.

In September 2020 Solomon and Blumberg published the book Game Changer. How to Be 10x in the Talent Economy. The book is about how to attract, retain and manage top talents especially in the tech field.

== Products and services ==
Michael Solomon and Rishon Blumberg, the company's founders, were formerly managers of musicians. The company represents programmers in their negotiations with companies and takes a percentage of the fees its programmers earn.
