= Krinos Foods =

US food importer and producer

- Type: Private
- Founded: 1958 or 1985
- Founder: John (Ioannis) Moscahlaidis
- Headquarters: New York, New York
- Key people: Eric Moscahlaidis (chairman)
- Products: Greek food Greek cuisine
- Website: www.krinos.com

Krinos Foods, Inc. is a United States private company based in New York that imports and produces Greek and other Mediterranean foods. It is one of the largest Greek food importers in North America. The company headquarters are in the Long Island City section of Queens, but it has purchased a site to move to the Bathgate Industrial Park in the Tremont section of the Bronx. In addition to New York, the company has manufacturing facilities in California, Atlanta,Chicago, Toronto, Vancouver, and Montreal.

== History ==
Krinos Foods traces its origins to the early 1950s, when it was founded by John (Ioannis) Moscahlaidis as a small shop in New York under the name Arista Olive Co. Inc., importing olive oil later marketed under the brand name "Krinos".

In 1958, Moscahlaidis acquired a building in the Tribeca neighborhood of Manhattan and relocated Arista to its first dedicated office. In 1960, he purchased an adjacent building, doubling the company’s storage capacity.

In 1965, the company established its Canadian division.

By 1973, the "Krinos" brand had become widely recognised, and the company was renamed Krinos Foods Inc. in the United States and Krinos Foods Canada Ltd. in Canada.

In the 1970s and 1980s, the company expanded through acquisitions, including Salona Importing Company, George E. Athens Co. (Big Alpha), and Standard Importing Company. Krinos also acquired a controlling interest in Athens Pastries & Frozen Foods Inc., later consolidating operations in Cleveland, Ohio, where Athens Foods became one of the largest producers of phyllo dough products.

In 1981, the company opened a new manufacturing and distribution facility in Long Island City, New York, which received a design award for industrial architecture.

John Moschalaidis later retired and returned to Greece in the early 2000s. His son, Eric Moschalaidis, became the company’s chairman.

In 2004, Krinos acquired Hellas International, a Greek food company headquartered in Salem, Massachusetts.

In June 2016, Krinos Foods opened a new $25 million, 100,000-square-foot facility in the Bronx, New York. The site serves as the company’s corporate headquarters and manufacturing and distribution centre, replacing its previous Long Island City plant.

== Products ==
Krinos both imports and manufactures Greek, Italian, Indian, Pakistani and Middle Eastern foods, including "cheeses, peppers, olives, ... cookies", phyllo, olive and other vegetable oils, figs, halva, grape leaves, yogurt, wines and beers (including Mythos beer from Greece), coffee, tea, fruit juices and nectars.

In the mid-2000s, the company was receiving approximately $18,000 a year in payments for the participation of its Long Island City plant in a remote power cut-off program with Enernoc of Boston.

== Controversies ==
In 1988, John Moschalaidis was sentenced to two years' imprisonment after pleading guilty to importing contaminated cheese and mislabeling dairy products.

Krinos was also found in 1990 to be selling a banned dye for Easter eggs, and in 1997 to be selling mislabeled cooking oil.

In 2005, an investigation by WABC reported on by ABC's Good Morning America found that some of the company's extra-virgin olive oil contained cheaper ingredients.

== Logo ==
The company logo features a letter "K" formed by two green olive leaves against a brown stem.
