= George Schlegel =

- Industry: Printing company
- Headquarters: New York
- Owner: Four generations of German businessmen

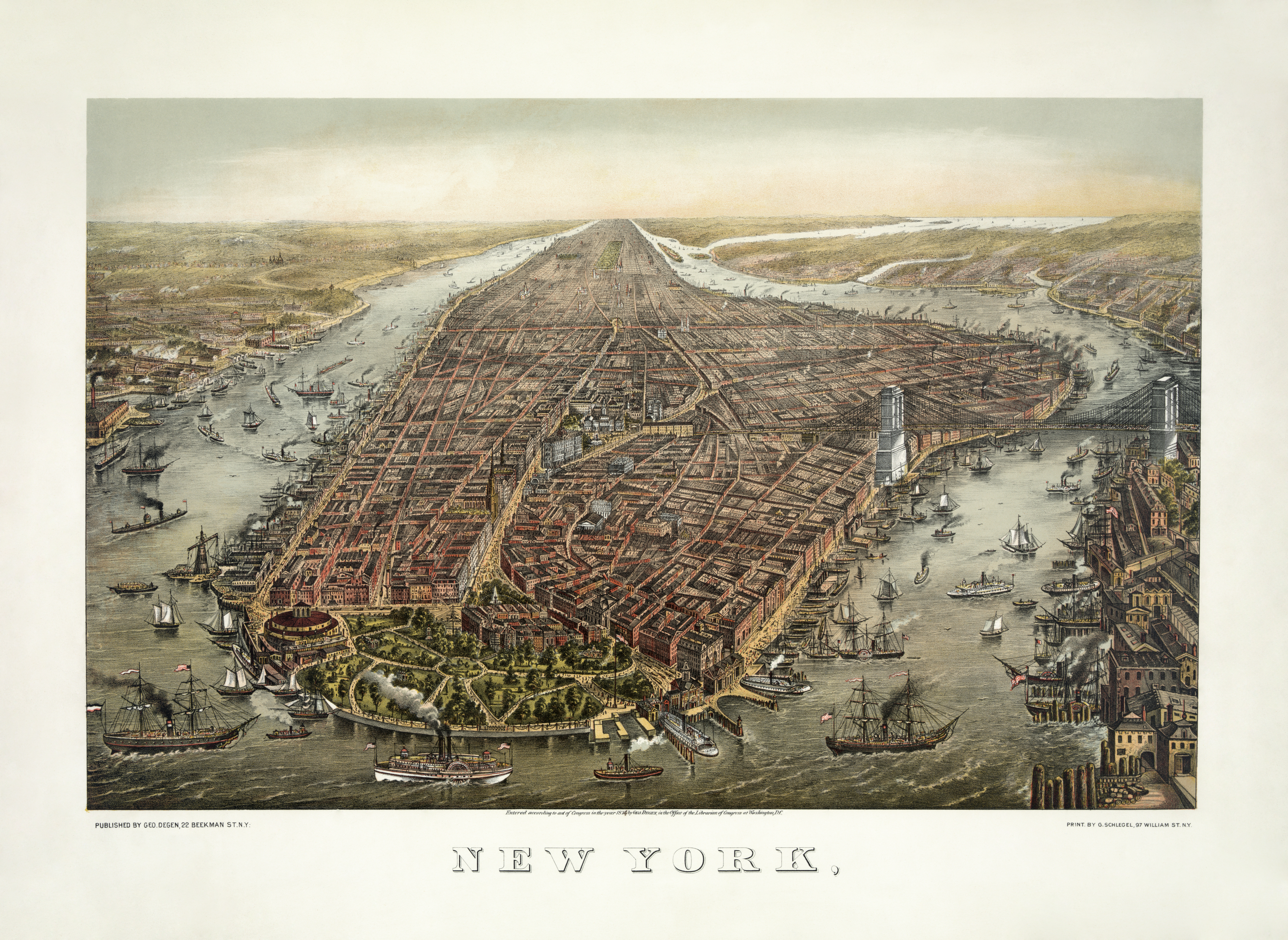
George Schlegel's bird's-eye-view lithograph of New York City from 1873.

George Schlegel Lithographing Co. (1849-1957) was a New York printing company best known for its label designs for cigars and cigar boxes, and was owned and operated during its lifetime by four generations of German businessmen.

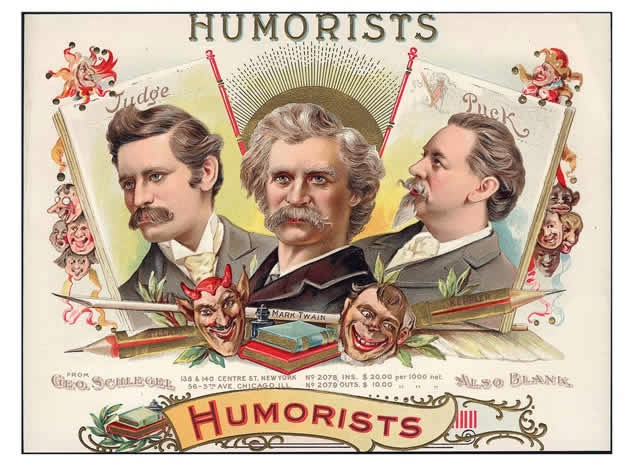
Cigar box label by Schlegel, showing Bernhard Gillam, Mark Twain and Joseph Keppler

After 1870, New York business abounded with German lithographic companies such as Schumacher and Ettlinger, the Knapp Company, F. Heppenheimer and Company, George Schlegel, Witsch and Schmitt, turning out advertisement art for the cigar industry. It was the visual appeal of a label which sold the product, causing cigar manufacturers to seek top quality artists and printing firms, and leading in turn to a boom in the lithographic art business.
