= 2010 PGA Championship =

Coordinates: 43.851°N 87.735°W

Tournament information
- Dates: August 12–15, 2010
- Location: Haven, Wisconsin
- Course(s): Whistling Straits; Straits Course
- Organized by: PGA of America
- Tour(s): PGA Tour; PGA European Tour; Japan Golf Tour

Statistics
- Par: 72
- Length: 7,514 yards (6,871 m)
- Field: 156 players, 72 after cut
- Cut: 145 (+1)
- Prize fund: $7,500,000 €5,639,314
- Winner's share: $1,350,000 €1,028,877

Champion
- (Germany) Martin Kaymer
- 277 (−11), playoff

Location in the United States
Location in Wisconsin

The 2010 PGA Championship was the 92nd PGA Championship, played August 12–15 at the Straits Course of the Whistling Straits complex in Haven, Wisconsin (postal address Kohler).

Martin Kaymer won his first major championship in a three-hole playoff over Bubba Watson. It was the second PGA Championship in six years at Whistling Straits, the first in 2004 was won by Vijay Singh, also in a playoff.

== Original venue ==
This championship was originally slated for Sahalee Country Club, east of Seattle, which hosted in 1998 and was selected in 1999 to host the championship again in 2010. That decision was reversed by the PGA of America in January 2005, when it was abruptly moved to Whistling Straits, which had recently hosted the very profitable 2004 edition and set new attendance records.

The PGA of America stated that it was concerned about the possibility of reduced financial support in the Pacific Northwest, as it was scheduled to be held less than six months after the conclusion of the 2010 Winter Olympics in Vancouver, British Columbia. As of 2024, the PGA of America has yet to commit to return to Sahalee, with future venues selected through 2031. Whistling Straits hosted its third PGA Championship in 2015.

== Field ==
The following qualification criteria were used to select the field. Each player is listed according to the first category by which he qualified, but other categories are shown in parentheses.

1. All former PGA Champions
Mark Brooks, John Daly, Steve Elkington, Pádraig Harrington (4,6,8,9), Davis Love III, Shaun Micheel, Phil Mickelson (3,8,9,10), Vijay Singh, David Toms, Tiger Woods (2,4,6,8,10), Yang Yong-eun (6,8)
(Eligible but did not compete: Rich Beem, Jack Burke Jr., Dow Finsterwald, Raymond Floyd, Doug Ford, Al Geiberger, Wayne Grady, David Graham, Hubert Green, Don January, John Mahaffey, Larry Nelson, Bobby Nichols, Jack Nicklaus, Gary Player, Nick Price, Jeff Sluman, Dave Stockton, Hal Sutton, Lee Trevino, Lanny Wadkins)

- Paul Azinger withdrew due to a foot injury.
- Bob Tway withdrew for undisclosed reasons.

2. Last five U.S. Open Champions
Ángel Cabrera (3,8), Lucas Glover (6,8), Graeme McDowell (6,8,9,10), Geoff Ogilvy (8,10)

3. Last five Masters Champions
Trevor Immelman, Zach Johnson (6,8,10)

4. Last five British Open Champions
Stewart Cink (8,9), Louis Oosthuizen (8,10)

5. Current Senior PGA Champion
Tom Lehman

6. 15 low scorers and ties in the 2009 PGA Championship
Ernie Els (8,10), Dustin Johnson (8,10), Martin Kaymer, Søren Kjeldsen, Rory McIlroy (8,10), John Merrick, Francesco Molinari, Henrik Stenson (9)

- Lee Westwood (8,9,10) withdrew due to a calf/ankle injury.

7. 20 low scorers in the 2010 PGA Professional National Championship
Danny Balin, Ryan Benzel, Kyle Flinton, Scott Hebert, David Hutsell, Stu Ingraham, Rob Labritz, Mitch Lowe, Robert McClellan, Bob Moss, Keith Ohr, Troy Pare, Jason Schmuhl, Mark Sheftic, Sonny Skinner, Mike Small, Bruce Smith, Rich Steinmetz, Chip Sullivan, Tim Thelen

8. Top 70 leaders in official money standings from the 2009 WGC-Bridgestone Invitational and Legends Reno-Tahoe Open to the 2010 Greenbrier Classic
Stephen Ames (10), Stuart Appleby (10), Ricky Barnes, Jason Bohn (10), Chad Campbell (9), Paul Casey (9), K. J. Choi, Tim Clark (9, 10), Ben Crane (9,10), Brian Davis, Jason Day (10), Brendon de Jonge, Luke Donald, Jason Dufner, Rickie Fowler, Jim Furyk (9,10), Sergio García (9), Brian Gay, Retief Goosen, Bill Haas (10), J. B. Holmes (9), Charles Howell III, Freddie Jacobson, Anthony Kim (9,10), Matt Kuchar (10), Martin Laird (10), Marc Leishman, Hunter Mahan (9,10), Steve Marino, Troy Matteson (10), Bryce Molder, Ryan Moore (10), Kevin Na, Sean O'Hair, Jeff Overton, Ryan Palmer (10), Kenny Perry (9), Tim Petrovic, Carl Pettersson (10), Ian Poulter (9,10), Justin Rose (9,10), Rory Sabbatini, Charl Schwartzel, Adam Scott (10), Heath Slocum (10), Brandt Snedeker, Steve Stricker (9, 10), Vaughn Taylor, Bo Van Pelt, Scott Verplank, Camilo Villegas (10), Nick Watney, Bubba Watson (10), Charlie Wi

- Robert Allenby withdrew due to a knee injury.

9. Members of the United States and European 2008 Ryder Cup teams (provided they are ranked in the top 100 in the Official World Golf Rankings on August 2, 2010)
Søren Hansen, Miguel Ángel Jiménez, Robert Karlsson, Oliver Wilson
(Ben Curtis (ranked 106), Justin Leonard (101), and Boo Weekley (162) failed to qualify under this category, but played out of other categories.)

10. Winners of tournaments co-sponsored or approved by the PGA Tour since the 2009 PGA Championship
Cameron Beckman, Matt Bettencourt, Derek Lamely, Bill Lunde

11. Vacancies are filled by the first available player from the list of alternates (those below 70th place in official money standings).
Paul Goydos, Jerry Kelly, Justin Leonard, George McNeill, John Senden, Kevin Stadler, Jimmy Walker

1. D. J. Trahan (ranked 80) replaced Paul Azinger.
2. Matt Jones (82) replaced Bob Tway.
3. D. A. Points (84) replaced Robert Allenby.
4. Kevin Sutherland (85) replaced Lee Westwood.
5. Kris Blanks (88) took spot reserved for WGC-Bridgestone Invitational winner

12. The PGA of America reserves the right to invite additional players not included in the categories listed above
Fredrik Andersson Hed, Grégory Bourdy, Darren Clarke, Ben Curtis, Rhys Davies, Simon Dyson, Gonzalo Fernández-Castaño, Ross Fisher, Hiroyuki Fujita, Stephen Gallacher, Anders Hansen, Peter Hanson, Tetsuji Hiratsuka, David Horsey, Yuta Ikeda, Ryo Ishikawa, Raphaël Jacquelin, Simon Khan, Kim Kyung-tae, Liang Wenchong, Shane Lowry, Ross McGowan, Edoardo Molinari, Colin Montgomerie, Noh Seung-yul, Koumei Oda, Corey Pavin, Álvaro Quirós, Michael Sim, Thongchai Jaidee, Boo Weekley, Mike Weir, Danny Willett, Chris Wood

== Course layout ==
The 2010 PGA Championship at Whistling Straits
Tee	Rating/Slope	1	2	3	4	5	6	7	8	9	Out	10	11	12	13	14	15	16	17	18	In	Total
Yards		408	593	181	493	598	355	221	507	449	3,805	361	618	143	404	373	518	569	223	500	3,709	7,514
Par		4	5	3	4	5	4	3	4	4	36	4	5	3	4	4	4	5	3	4	36	72

Previous course lengths for major championships

- 7,514 yards (6,871 m) – par 72, 2004 PGA Championship

== Round summaries ==
=== First round ===
Thursday, August 12, 2010

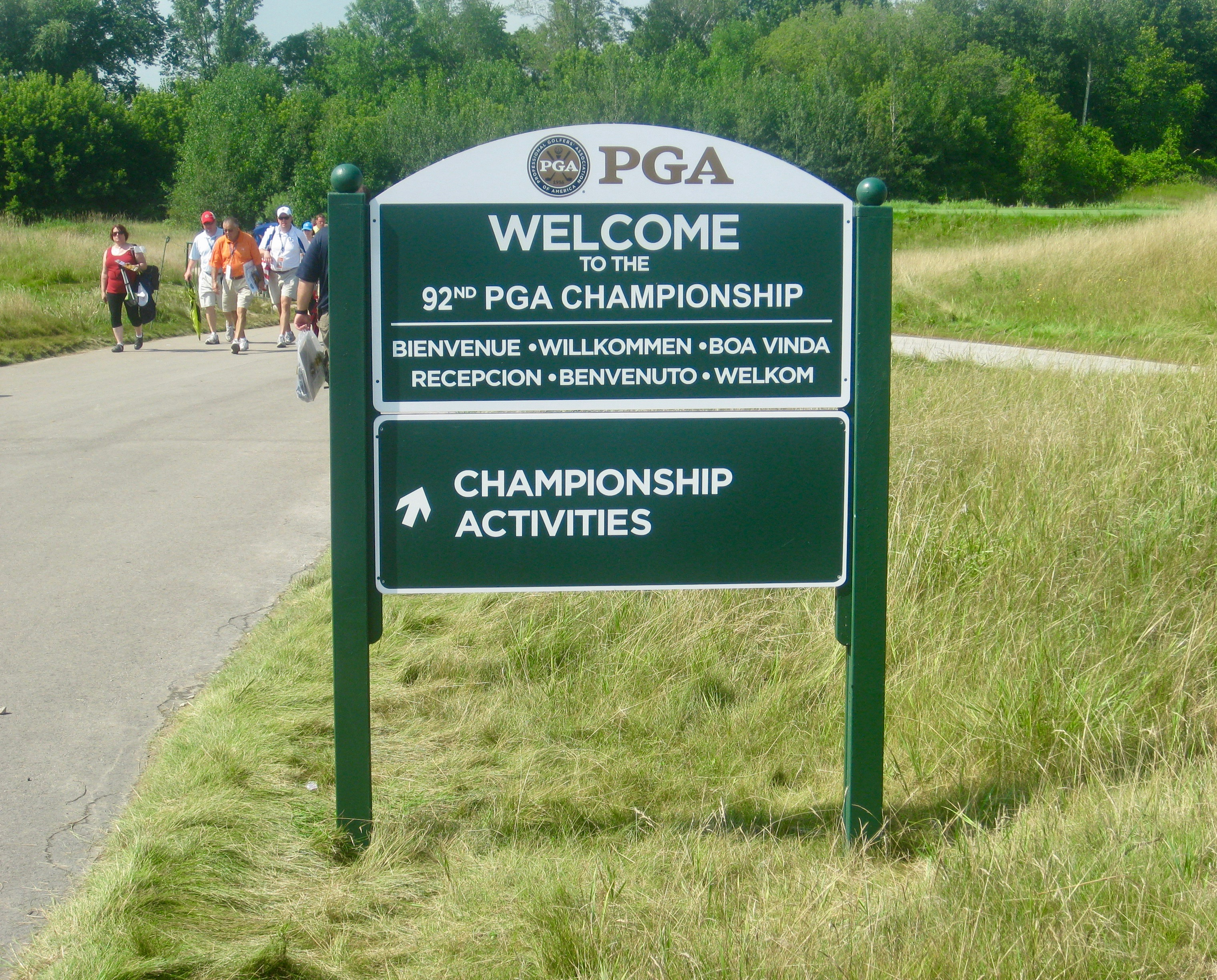
2010 PGA Championship entrance sign

The start of play was delayed on Thursday morning by over three hours due to fog; when the early starters finally got out, Bubba Watson and Francesco Molinari posted the best scores, setting a clubhouse target of four-under-par. Play was suspended on Thursday evening with half the field yet to complete their rounds; a second fog delay on Friday morning further delayed completion of the first round. Matt Kuchar defied the stoppages to take the first round lead, chasing his first win after a year of top-10s. Teenager Noh Seung-yul was only one shot behind, in the group at four-under, looking to become the second successive Korean PGA Championship winner.

Place	Player	Score	To par
1	(United States) Matt Kuchar	67	−5
T2	(South Africa) Ernie Els	68	−4
T2	(Italy) Francesco Molinari	68	−4
T2	(South Korea) Noh Seung-yul	68	−4
T2	(United States) Bubba Watson	68	−4
T6	(Australia) Jason Day	69	−3
T6	(United States) Charles Howell III	69	−3
T6	(United States) Zach Johnson	69	−3
T6	(England) Simon Khan	69	−3
T6	(United States) Ryan Moore	69	−3
T6	(United States) Nick Watney	69	−3

=== Second round ===
Friday, August 13, 2010

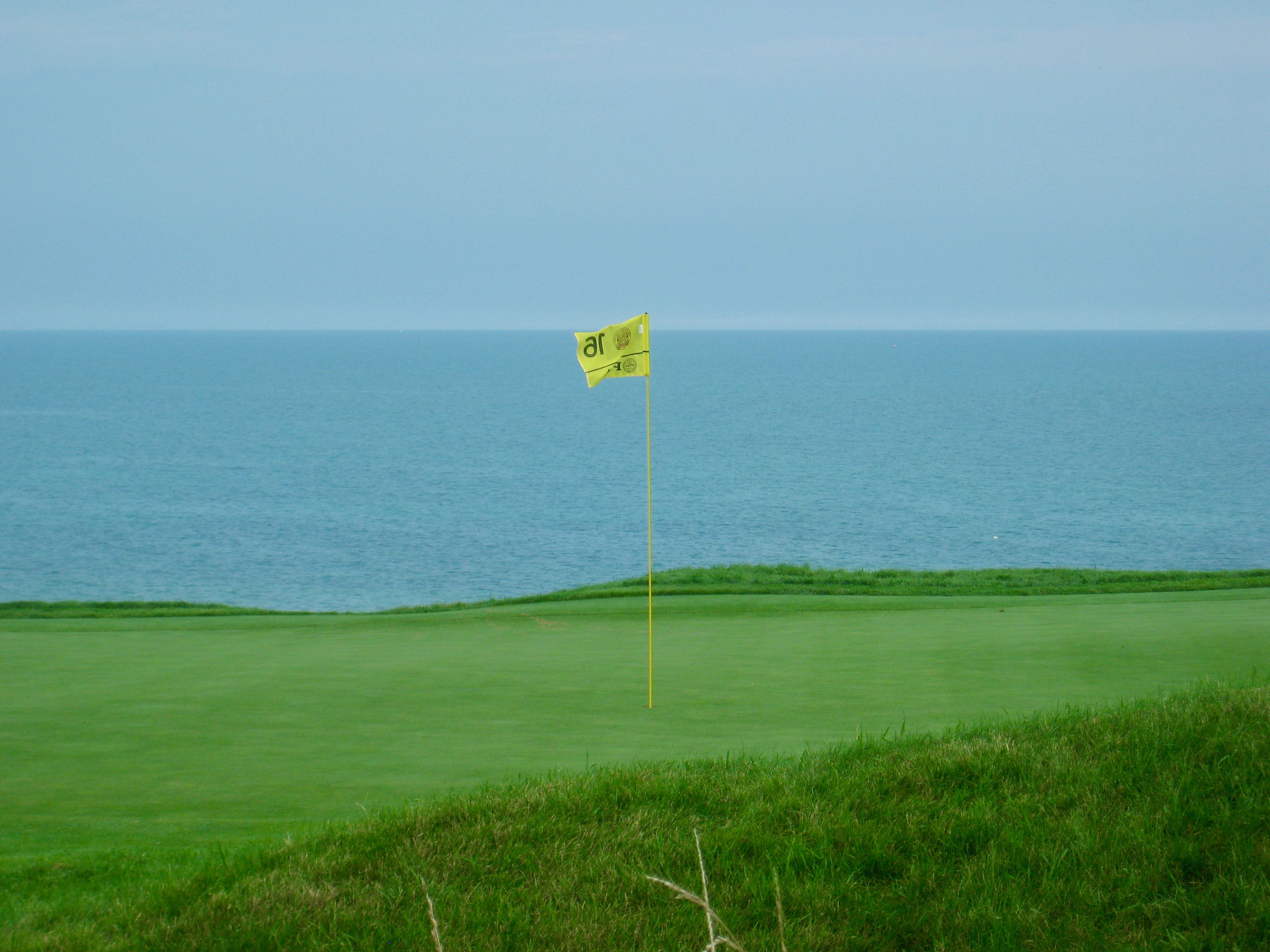
Hole 16 at Whistling Straits during the 2010 PGA Championship.

Matt Kuchar fired a second-round 69 to lead by one shot after day two. Fog again delayed the start by two and a half hours, but Kuchar was eight under at the close, one ahead of fellow American Nick Watney. The late start meant half the field would finish their rounds on Saturday.

Place	Player	Score	To par
1	(United States) Matt Kuchar	67-69=136	−8
2	(United States) Nick Watney	69-68=137	−7
T3	(United States) Jim Furyk	70-68=138	−6
T3	(United States) J. B. Holmes	72-66=138	−6
T5	(United States) Jason Dufner	73-66=139	−5
T5	(United States) Dustin Johnson	71-68=139	−5
T5	(United States) Zach Johnson	69-70=139	−5
T5	(England) Simon Khan	69-70=139	−5
T5	(Northern Ireland) Rory McIlroy	71-68=139	−5
T5	(United States) Bryce Molder	72-67=139	−5
T5	(South Korea) Noh Seung-yul	68-71=139	−5
T5	(United States) Ryan Palmer	71-68=139	−5
T5	(Fiji) Vijay Singh	73-66=139	−5
T5	(United States) Bubba Watson	68-71=139	−5

=== Third round ===
Saturday, August 14, 2010

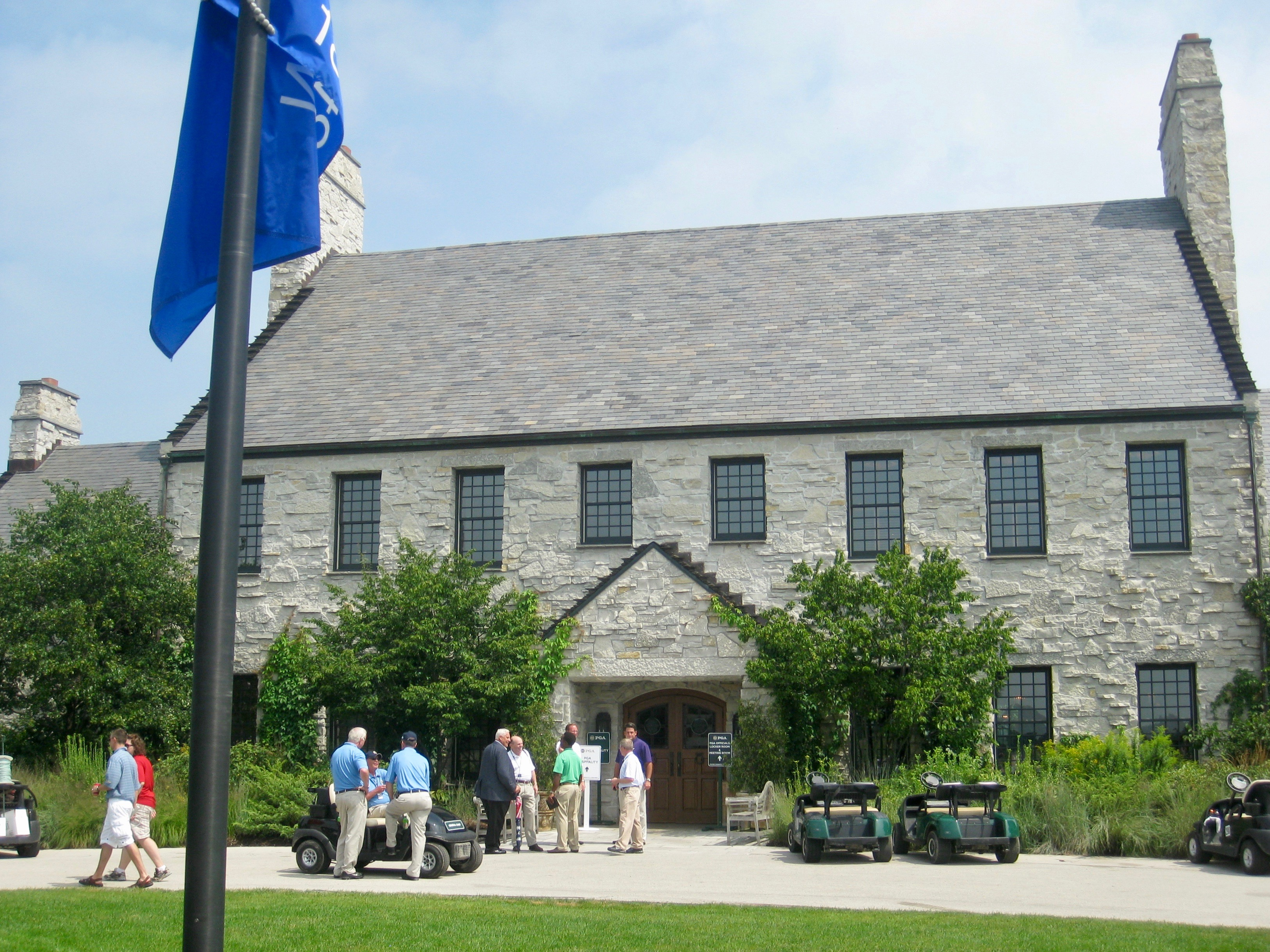
Whistling Straits clubhouse during the 2010 PGA Championship

In the third round, Liang Wenchong shot a course-record 64 and moved into a tie for fourth place. Overnight leader Matt Kuchar dropped back to seven under, and Nick Watney shot a 66 to take a three-stroke lead over Rory McIlroy and Dustin Johnson going into the final round. Half the 156 starters were forced to complete their seconds rounds on the Saturday after almost six hours were lost because of fog over the first two days.

Place	Player	Score	To par
1	(United States) Nick Watney	69-68-66=203	−13
T2	(United States) Dustin Johnson	71-68-67=206	−10
T2	(Northern Ireland) Rory McIlroy	71-68-67=206	−10
T4	(Australia) Jason Day	69-72-66=207	−9
T4	(Germany) Martin Kaymer	72-68-67=207	−9
T4	(China) Liang Wenchong	72-71-64=207	−9
T7	(United States) Jason Dufner	73-66-69=208	−8
T7	(Australia) Steve Elkington	71-70-67=208	−8
T7	(United States) Jim Furyk	70-68-70=208	−8
T7	(United States) Zach Johnson	69-70-69=208	−8

=== Final round ===
Sunday, August 15, 2010

Seven different players held at least a share of the lead in the final round. Overnight leader Watney collapsed with an 81 (+9), including a triple-bogey on the 7th hole when he hit his ball into the water after hearing a camera click. Steve Elkington made a run towards the end, tying for the lead with a birdie on 16, but bogeyed the last two holes to finish two strokes back. Bubba Watson frequently drove his tee shots over 350 yards (320 m) and shot 68, including a birdie on the 16th hole to tie for the lead. He finished at 277, 11-under par. Kaymer, who held the lead for most of the day, made a 15-foot (5 m) par putt at the 18th hole to tie Watson for the clubhouse lead. McIlroy had a 15-footer for birdie on the 72nd green to tie for the lead with Watson and Kaymer, but missed. Dustin Johnson birdied 16 and 17 to take a one-shot lead with one hole to play, but bogeyed the final hole to apparently tie for the lead. After further review, it was decided that he had "grounded his club" in a bunker just off the edge of the 18th fairway, which is a contravention of Rule 13.4 of the Rules of Golf. Johnson readily admitted that he grounded his club but he did not know that the sandy patch beside the 18th fairway from which he played his second shot was deemed to be a bunker. He was given a two-stroke penalty and fell into a tie for fifth place.

Place	Player	Score	To par	Money ($)
T1	(Germany) Martin Kaymer	72-68-67-70=277	−11	Playoff
T1	(United States) Bubba Watson	68-71-70-68=277	−11	Playoff
T3	(United States) Zach Johnson	69-70-69-70=278	−10	435,000
T3	(Northern Ireland) Rory McIlroy	71-68-67-72=278	−10	435,000
T5	(United States) Jason Dufner	73-66-69-71=279	−9	270,833
T5	(Australia) Steve Elkington	71-70-67-71=279	−9	270,833
T5	(United States) Dustin Johnson	71-68-67-73=279	−9	270,833
T8	(Colombia) Camilo Villegas	71-71-70-68=280	−8	210,000
T8	(China) Liang Wenchong	72-71-64-73=280	−8	210,000
T10	(Australia) Jason Day	69-72-66-74=281	−7	175,800
T10	(United States) Matt Kuchar	67-69-73-72=281	−7	175,800

Complete leaderboard

==== Scorecard ====
Final round

Hole	1	2	3	4	5	6	7	8	9	10	11	12	13	14	15	16	17	18
Par	4	5	3	4	5	4	3	4	4	4	5	3	4	4	4	5	3	4
(Germany) Kaymer	−9	−10	−10	−11	−11	−11	−11	−11	−11	−12	−12	−12	−12	−12	−11	−11	−11	−11
(United States) Watson	−7	−8	−8	−7	−9	−9	−9	−9	−9	−9	−9	−9	−10	−11	−11	−12	−11	−11
(United States) Z. Johnson	−9	−9	−9	−8	−8	−9	−8	−9	−9	−10	−9	−9	−9	−9	−9	−10	−10	−10
(Northern Ireland) McIlroy	−10	−10	−10	−9	−9	−9	−10	−9	−9	−10	−10	−10	−10	−11	−10	−10	−10	−10
(United States) Dufner	−8	−8	−8	−8	−9	−8	−8	−8	−8	−9	−9	−9	−9	−9	−9	−9	−8	−9
(Australia) Elkington	−8	−8	−7	−7	−8	−9	−9	−9	−9	−10	−10	−10	−10	−10	−10	−11	−10	−9
(United States) D. Johnson	−11	−11	−10	−9	−10	−10	−9	−9	−9	−9	−9	−9	−10	−10	−10	−11	−12	−9
(Colombia) Villegas	−5	−5	−6	−5	−5	−6	−7	−8	−6	−5	−5	−5	−6	−6	−6	−8	−8	−8
(China) Liang	−8	−9	−9	−9	−9	−9	−8	−8	−7	−7	−7	−7	−7	−7	−7	−8	−8	−8
(Australia) Day	−9	−10	−10	−10	−9	−10	−10	−10	−8	−8	−8	−8	−8	−7	−6	−7	−6	−7
(United States) Watney	−11	−11	−11	−10	−10	−11	−8	−7	−6	−6	−4	−4	−3	−3	−2	−3	−4	−4

Cumulative tournament scores, relative to par

Eagle	Birdie	Bogey	Double bogey	Triple bogey+

- Dustin Johnson was assessed a two-stroke penalty on 18th hole, resulting in a triple bogey seven.

=== Playoff ===
Kaymer and Watson advanced to the three-hole aggregate playoff, played on the 10th, 17th, and 18th holes. Watson nearly drove the green on the short par-4 and capitalized with a birdie to take the early lead; Kaymer missed a long birdie putt and made par. On the par-3 17th, Kaymer tied Watson by making a 15-footer for birdie while Watson missed a 45-footer and had to settle for par. Tied with one hole remaining, the playoff was now effectively sudden-death on the par-4 18th. Both hit their tee shots into the right rough, and Watson played aggressively; he went for the green on his second shot but it fell well short, into the creek in front of the green. With Watson in the hazard, Kaymer elected to lay up from his poor lie and only advanced the ball a little ways up the fairway on his second shot, and hit his third shot within 15 feet (5 m) from the cup. After his drop from the hazard, Watson hit his fourth shot through the green into a bunker, but nearly holed the bunker shot for bogey that potentially could have extended the playoff. Kaymer's putt for par ended two feet (0.6 m) past and below the hole; he sank the bogey putt to win his first major championship.

Place	Player	Score	To par	Money ($)
1	(Germany) Martin Kaymer	4-2-5=11	E	1,350,000
2	(United States) Bubba Watson	3-3-6=12	+1	810,000

==== Scorecard ====
Playoff

Hole	10	17	18
Par	4	3	4
(Germany) Kaymer	E	−1	E
(United States) Watson	−1	−1	+1

Cumulative playoff scores, relative to par

== Television ==
Television coverage was provided in the United States by CBS and TNT, and in the United Kingdom by Sky Sports.
