= 2015 PGA Championship =

Tournament information
- Dates: August 13–16, 2015
- Location: Kohler/Haven, Wisconsin; 43.851°N 87.735°W
- Courses: Whistling Straits; Straits Course
- Organized by: PGA of America
- Tours: PGA Tour; European Tour; Japan Golf Tour

Statistics
- Par: 72
- Length: 7,501 yards (6,859 m)
- Field: 156 players, 77 after cut
- Cut: 146 (+2)
- Prize fund: $10,000,000 €9,213,193
- Winner's share: $1,800,000 €1,658,375

Champion
- (Australia) Jason Day
- 268 (−20)
- Location in the United States Location in Wisconsin

The 2015 PGA Championship was the 97th PGA Championship, held August 13–16 on the Straits Course of Whistling Straits in Kohler, Wisconsin (the course is physically in Haven but holds a Kohler mailing address due to its Kohler Company ownership). It was the third PGA Championship at Whistling Straits, which previously hosted in 2004 and 2010, as well as the United States Senior Open in 2007, all held on the Straits Course.

Jason Day won his first major championship title with a total score of 268 (−20), at the time the lowest score in relation to par ever recorded in a major (a mark since equaled by Henrik Stenson during his win at the 2016 Open Championship, Dustin Johnson at the 2020 Masters Tournament, and Cameron Smith at the 2022 Open Championship). Jordan Spieth, attempting to win his third major of the year, finished in second place three strokes behind. The second-place finish allowed Spieth to surpass Rory McIlroy as number one in the Official World Golf Ranking. Day was the fifth Australian to win the PGA Championship, the first in twenty years.

== Course layout ==
Straits Course

Hole	Name	Yards	Par	Hole	Name	Yards	Par
1	Outward Bound	408	4	10	Voyageur	361	4
2	Cross Country	593	5	11	Sand Box	563	5
3	O' Man	181	3	12	Pop Up	143	3
4	Glory	489	4	13	Cliff Hanger	404	4
5	Snake	603	5	14	Widow's Watch	397	4
6	Gremlin's Ear	355	4	15	Grand Strand	518	4
7	Shipwreck	221	3	16	Endless Bite	569	5
8	On the Rocks	507	4	17	Pinched Nerve	223	3
9	Down and Dirty	446	4	18	Dyeabolical	520	4
Out		3,803	36	In		3,698	36
Source:				Total		7,501	72

Previous course lengths for major championships

- 7,514 yards (6,871 m) – par 72, 2010 PGA Championship
- 7,514 yards (6,871 m) – par 72, 2004 PGA Championship

== Field ==
The following qualification criteria were used to select the field. Each player is listed according to the first category by which he qualified with additional categories in which he qualified shown in parentheses.

1. All former PGA Champions

- Rich Beem
- Keegan Bradley (8,9)
- Mark Brooks
- John Daly
- Jason Dufner
- Pádraig Harrington (10)
- Martin Kaymer (2,9)
- Davis Love III
- Rory McIlroy (2,4,6,8,9,10)
- Shaun Micheel
- Phil Mickelson (4,6,8,9)
- Vijay Singh
- David Toms
- Tiger Woods
- Yang Yong-eun
- The following former champions did not compete: Paul Azinger, Jack Burke Jr., Steve Elkington, Dow Finsterwald, Raymond Floyd, Doug Ford, Al Geiberger, Wayne Grady, David Graham, Hubert Green, Don January, John Mahaffey, Larry Nelson, Bobby Nichols, Jack Nicklaus, Gary Player, Nick Price, Jeff Sluman, Dave Stockton, Hal Sutton, Lee Trevino, Bob Tway, Lanny Wadkins

2. Last five U.S. Open Champions

- Justin Rose (8,9,10)
- Webb Simpson (8,9)
- Jordan Spieth (3,8,9,10)

3. Last five Masters Champions

- Charl Schwartzel (6,8)
- Adam Scott (6,8)
- Bubba Watson (8,9,10)

4. Last five Open Champions

- Darren Clarke
- Ernie Els (6)
- Zach Johnson (8,9)

5. Current Senior PGA Champion

- Colin Montgomerie

6. 15 low scorers and ties in the 2014 PGA Championship

- Kevin Chappell
- Jason Day (8,10)
- Victor Dubuisson (9)
- Rickie Fowler (8,9,10)
- Jim Furyk (8,9,10)
- Mikko Ilonen
- Brooks Koepka (8,10)
- Hunter Mahan (8,9,10)
- Louis Oosthuizen (8)
- Ryan Palmer (8)
- Brandt Snedeker (8,10)
- Henrik Stenson (8,9)
- Steve Stricker
- Jimmy Walker (8,9,10)
- Marc Warren
- Lee Westwood (9)
- Bernd Wiesberger
- Graham DeLaet did not play due to a thumb injury.

7. 20 low scorers in the 2015 PGA Professional National Championship

- Brian Cairns
- Matt Dobyns
- Sean Dougherty
- Charles Frost
- Brian Gaffney
- Ryan Helminen
- Brett Jones
- Ryan Kennedy
- Johan Kok
- Alan Morin
- Jeff Olson
- Austin Peters
- Ben Polland
- Adam Rainaud
- Brent Snyder
- Bob Sowards
- Grant Sturgeon
- Omar Uresti
- Daniel Venezio
- Steven Young

8. Top 70 leaders in official money standings from the 2014 WGC-Bridgestone Invitational to the 2015 Quicken Loans National

- Bae Sang-moon (10)
- Daniel Berger
- Jason Bohn
- Steven Bowditch (10)
- Paul Casey
- Brendon de Jonge
- Harris English
- Matt Every (10)
- Tony Finau
- Sergio García (9)
- Fabián Gómez (10)
- Bill Haas (10)
- Chesson Hadley
- James Hahn (10)
- Brian Harman
- David Hearn
- Russell Henley
- Charley Hoffman (10)
- Morgan Hoffmann
- J. B. Holmes (10)
- Billy Horschel (10)
- Dustin Johnson (10)
- Matt Jones
- Kevin Kisner
- Russell Knox
- Matt Kuchar (9)
- Danny Lee (10)
- Marc Leishman
- David Lingmerth (10)
- Ben Martin (10)
- Hideki Matsuyama
- Troy Merritt (10)
- Ryan Moore (10)
- Kevin Na
- Geoff Ogilvy
- Scott Piercy (10)
- Ian Poulter (9)
- Patrick Reed (9,10)
- John Senden
- Shawn Stefani
- Robert Streb (10)
- Kevin Streelman
- Justin Thomas
- Brendon Todd
- Cameron Tringale
- Camilo Villegas (10)
- Nick Watney
- Boo Weekley
- Chris Kirk (10) and Gary Woodland (neck injury) did not play.

9. Members of the United States and European 2014 Ryder Cup teams (provided they are ranked in the top 100 in the Official World Golf Ranking on August 2, 2015)

- Jamie Donaldson
- Stephen Gallacher
- Graeme McDowell
- Thomas Bjørn (ranked 109) did not qualify, but was invited under category 12.

10. Winners of tournaments co-sponsored or approved by the PGA Tour since the 2014 PGA Championship

- Alex Čejka
- J. J. Henry
- Shane Lowry
- Nick Taylor

11. Vacancies are filled by the first available player from the list of alternates (those below 70th place in official money standings).

- Charles Howell III
- Pat Perez
- Rory Sabbatini
- Brendan Steele

12. The PGA of America reserves the right to invite additional players not included in the categories listed above

- An Byeong-hun
- Kiradech Aphibarnrat
- Thomas Bjørn
- Rafa Cabrera-Bello
- Tim Clark
- George Coetzee
- Luke Donald
- Ross Fisher
- Tommy Fleetwood
- Branden Grace
- Emiliano Grillo
- Tyrrell Hatton
- David Howell
- Hiroshi Iwata
- Thongchai Jaidee
- Miguel Ángel Jiménez
- Søren Kjeldsen
- Anirban Lahiri
- Pablo Larrazábal
- Alexander Lévy
- Joost Luiten
- George McNeill
- Francesco Molinari
- James Morrison
- Koumei Oda
- Eddie Pepperell
- Richie Ramsay
- Marcel Siem
- Cameron Smith
- Andy Sullivan
- Danny Willett
- Chris Wood
- Alex Norén was invited but did not play.

Alternates (category 11)

1. Martin Laird – took spot reserved for WGC-Bridgestone Invitational winner
2. Sean O'Hair – replaced Graham DeLaet
3. Carl Pettersson – replaced Gary Woodland

== Round summaries ==
=== First round ===
Thursday, August 13, 2015

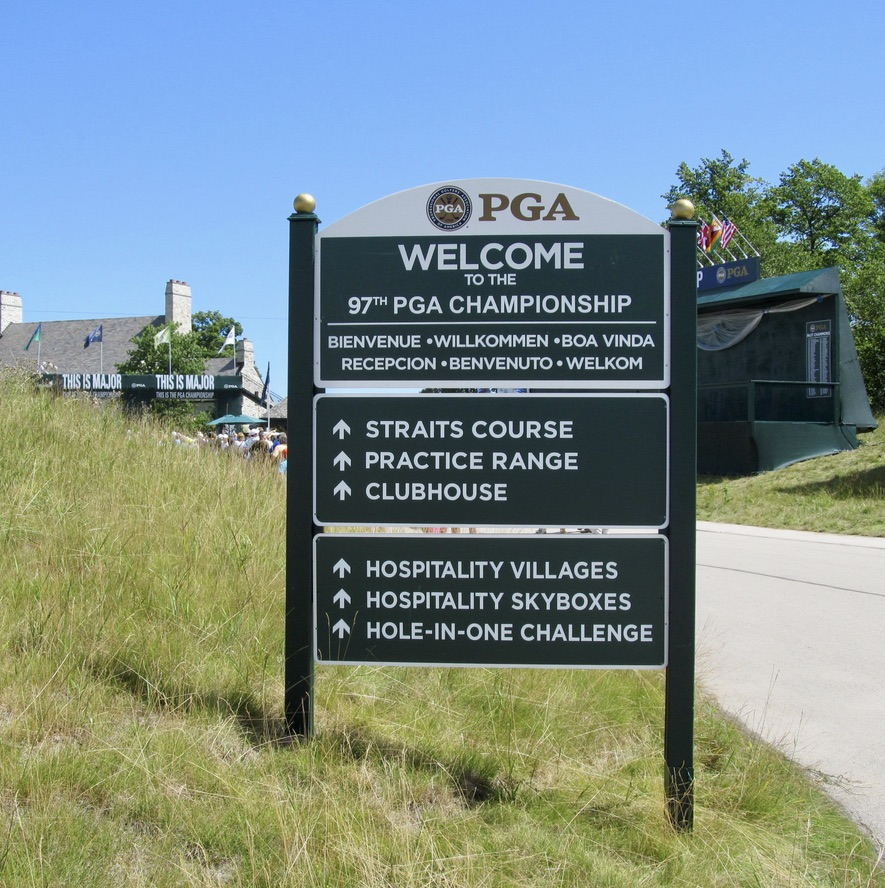
2015 PGA Championship entrance sign

Dustin Johnson recorded five birdies and an eagle and opened with a round of 66 (−6) for a one-stroke lead. This was the third consecutive major championship in which Johnson has held at least a share of the lead after the first round. David Lingmerth birdied five out of his first seven holes on the way to a round of 67 (−5) and is a stroke behind. Defending champion Rory McIlroy, playing his first tournament since the U.S. Open after an ankle injury, opened with a round of 71 (−1), as did Masters and U.S. Open champion Jordan Spieth.

Place	Player	Score	To par
1	(United States) Dustin Johnson	66	−6
2	(Sweden) David Lingmerth	67	−5
T3	(Australia) Jason Day	68	−4
T3	(United States) Harris English	68	−4
T3	(United States) Russell Henley	68	−4
T3	(United States) J. B. Holmes	68	−4
T3	(Australia) Matt Jones	68	−4
T3	(United States) Matt Kuchar	68	−4
T3	(New Zealand) Danny Lee	68	−4
T3	(United States) Scott Piercy	68	−4

=== Second round ===
Friday, August 14, 2015
Saturday, August 15, 2015

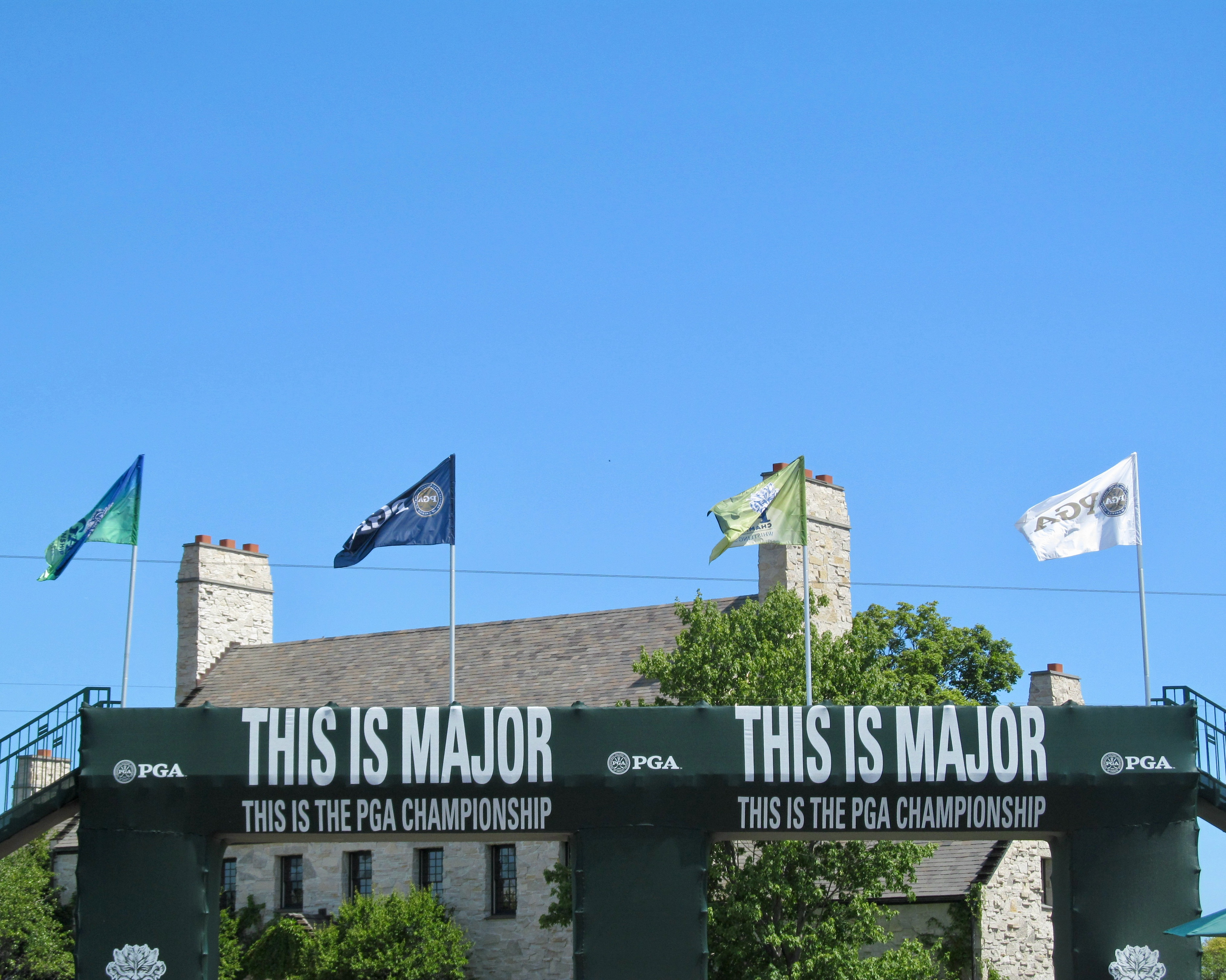
Whistling Straits clubhouse during the 2015 PGA Championship

Play was suspended at 5:28 p.m. CDT due to thunderstorms with Jason Day and Matt Jones tied for the lead at nine-under par. David Lingmerth was the clubhouse leader at seven-under. Hiroshi Iwata tied a major championship record with a round of 63 (−9), the 27th time that had been achieved in a major and 13th time at the PGA Championship.

Place	Player	Score	To par
1	(Australia) Matt Jones	68-65=133	−11
2	(Australia) Jason Day	68-67=135	−9
3	(England) Justin Rose	69-67=136	−8
T4	(United States) Tony Finau	71-66=137	−7
T4	(India) Anirban Lahiri	70-67=137	−7
T4	(Sweden) David Lingmerth	67-70=137	−7
T7	(United States) Scott Piercy	68-70=138	−6
T7	(United States) Jordan Spieth	71-67=138	−6
T7	(United States) Brendan Steele	69-69=138	−6
T10	(South Africa) George Coetzee	74-65=139	−5
T10	(United States) Harris English	68-71=139	−5
T10	(United States) Russell Henley	68-71=139	−5
T10	(United States) J. B. Holmes	68-71=139	−5
T10	(United States) Dustin Johnson	66-73=139	−5

=== Third round ===
Saturday, August 15, 2015

Following the completion of the second round on Saturday morning, the third round began at 9:15 a.m. CDT. After a round of 66 (−6), which included eight birdies and an eagle to offset a double bogey at the 15th, Jason Day built a two-stroke lead after 54 holes. Day carried at least a share of the lead into the final round for the third consecutive major championship, the first since Phil Mickelson in 2006 to do so. Jordan Spieth birdied six out of his last eight holes for a bogey-free round of 65 (−7) to move into second place. Branden Grace had the low round of the day with a 64 (−8) and jumped from 28th at the start of the round to a tie for third.

Place	Player	Score	To par
1	(Australia) Jason Day	68-67-66=201	−15
2	(United States) Jordan Spieth	71-67-65=203	−13
T3	(South Africa) Branden Grace	71-69-64=204	−12
T3	(England) Justin Rose	69-67-68=204	−12
5	(Germany) Martin Kaymer	70-70-65=205	−11
T6	(United States) Tony Finau	71-66-69=206	−10
T6	(Australia) Matt Jones	68-65-73=206	−10
T8	(United States) Dustin Johnson	66-73-68=207	−9
T8	(India) Anirban Lahiri	70-67-70=207	−9
T10	(United States) J. B. Holmes	68-71-69=208	−8
T10	(United States) Billy Horschel	72-68-68=208	−8
T10	(United States) Matt Kuchar	68-72-68=208	−8

=== Final round ===
Sunday, August 16, 2015

Jason Day set a major championship scoring record on the way to a three-stroke victory and his first career major. After a round of 67 (−5) he finished the tournament at 20-under-par, breaking the previous major scoring record set by Tiger Woods at the 2000 Open Championship. Jordan Spieth, looking to join Woods and Ben Hogan with three major victories in a year, began the final round two strokes behind but was never able to close that deficit, finishing three shots behind. Spieth finished the year 54-under-par at the majors, also surpassing Woods' record from 2000. Branden Grace and Justin Rose also got to within two shots of the lead but fell from contention after double bogeys at the 10th and 13th, respectively.

==== Final leaderboard ====
Champion
Crystal Bowl winner (leading PGA Club Pro)
(c) = past champion

Note: Top 15 and ties qualify for the 2016 PGA Championship; top 4 and ties qualify for the 2016 Masters Tournament

Place	Player	Score	To par	Money ($)
1	(Australia) Jason Day	68-67-66-67=268	−20	1,800,000
2	(United States) Jordan Spieth	71-67-65-68=271	−17	1,080,000
3	(South Africa) Branden Grace	71-69-64-69=273	−15	680,000
4	(England) Justin Rose	69-67-68-70=274	−14	480,000
T5	(United States) Brooks Koepka	73-69-67-66=275	−13	367,500
T5	(India) Anirban Lahiri	70-67-70-68=275	−13	367,500
T7	(South Africa) George Coetzee	74-65-70-67=276	−12	293,000
T7	(United States) Dustin Johnson	66-73-68-69=276	−12	293,000
T7	(United States) Matt Kuchar	68-72-68-68=276	−12	293,000
T10	(United States) Tony Finau	71-66-69-71=277	−11	243,000
T10	(United States) Robert Streb	70-73-67-67=277	−11	243,000

Leaderboard below the top 10
Place	Player	Score	To par	Money ($)
T12	(United States) Russell Henley	68-71-70-69=278	−10	185,400
T12	(Germany) Martin Kaymer (c)	70-70-65-73=278	−10	185,400
T12	(Sweden) David Lingmerth	67-70-75-66=278	−10	185,400
T12	(United States) Brandt Snedeker	71-70-68-69=278	−10	185,400
T12	(United States) Brendan Steele	69-69-73-67=278	−10	185,400
17	(Northern Ireland) Rory McIlroy (c)	71-71-68-69=279	−9	148,000
T18	(France) Victor Dubuisson	76-70-67-67=280	−8	126,000
T18	(United States) Phil Mickelson (c)	72-73-66-69=280	−8	126,000
T18	(United States) Justin Thomas	72-70-68-70=280	−8	126,000
T21	(Japan) Hiroshi Iwata	77-63-70-71=281	−7	97,667
T21	(Australia) Matt Jones	68-65-73-75=281	−7	97,667
T21	(United States) Bubba Watson	72-71-70-68=281	−7	97,667
24	(United States) J. B. Holmes	68-71-69-74=282	−6	86,000
T25	(South Africa) Ernie Els	71-71-69-72=283	−5	74,600
T25	(England) Tyrrell Hatton	73-72-68-70=283	−5	74,600
T25	(United States) Billy Horschel	72-68-68-75=283	−5	74,600
T25	(Australia) Cameron Smith	74-68-70-71=283	−5	74,600
T25	(Sweden) Henrik Stenson	76-66-70-71=283	−5	74,600
T30	(England) Paul Casey	70-70-70-74=284	−4	56,057
T30	(United States) Rickie Fowler	73-70-70-71=284	−4	56,057
T30	(United States) Jim Furyk	73-70-69-72=284	−4	56,057
T30	(South Africa) Louis Oosthuizen	72-71-72-69=284	−4	56,057
T30	(United States) Patrick Reed	75-69-67-73=284	−4	56,057
T30	(United States) Steve Stricker	71-72-71-70=284	−4	56,057
T30	(United States) Nick Watney	78-68-68-70=284	−4	56,057
T37	(United States) Jason Bohn	74-71-66-74=285	−3	39,200
T37	(Japan) Hideki Matsuyama	70-70-71-74=285	−3	39,200
T37	(United States) Ryan Moore	73-70-75-67=285	−3	39,200
T37	(South Africa) Charl Schwartzel	73-69-68-75=285	−3	39,200
T37	(Fiji) Vijay Singh (c)	73-71-71-70=285	−3	39,200
T37	(United States) Boo Weekley	75-70-65-75=285	−3	39,200
T43	(United States) Kevin Chappell	73-68-78-67=286	−2	30,000
T43	(England) Luke Donald	72-70-70-74=286	−2	30,000
T43	(New Zealand) Danny Lee	68-77-69-72=286	−2	30,000
T43	(United States) Hunter Mahan	72-68-73-73=286	−2	30,000
T43	(England) Lee Westwood	72-72-70-72=286	−2	30,000
T48	(Denmark) Thomas Bjørn	69-75-69-74=287	−1	25,750
T48	(United States) Harris English	68-71-76-72=287	−1	25,750
T48	(United States) Scott Piercy	68-70-74-75=287	−1	25,750
T48	(Germany) Marcel Siem	70-70-73-74=287	−1	25,750
T48	(Scotland) Marc Warren	72-73-69-73=287	−1	25,750
T48	(South Korea) Yang Yong-eun (c)	70-72-72-73=287	−1	25,750
T54	(Spain) Sergio García	72-71-75-70=288	E	22,500
T54	(Finland) Mikko Ilonen	72-73-71-72=288	E	22,500
T54	(United States) Troy Merritt	74-70-75-69=288	E	22,500
T54	(Italy) Francesco Molinari	71-73-69-75=288	E	22,500
T54	(United States) Webb Simpson	71-71-72-74=288	E	22,500
T54	(United States) Kevin Streelman	73-71-74-70=288	E	22,500
T54	(England) Danny Willett	74-70-71-73=288	E	22,500
T61	(United States) Keegan Bradley (c)	76-70-72-71=289	+1	20,200
T61	(Argentina) Emiliano Grillo	70-73-72-74=289	+1	20,200
T61	(United States) Chesson Hadley	73-71-70-75=289	+1	20,200
64	(South Korea) Bae Sang-moon	71-72-72-75=290	+2	19,400
T65	(Zimbabwe) Brendon de Jonge	72-71-75-73=291	+3	18,800
T65	(United States) Bill Haas	73-72-71-75=291	+3	18,800
T65	(United States) Charles Howell III	70-70-77-74=291	+3	18,800
T68	(Thailand) Kiradech Aphibarnrat	72-72-73-75=292	+4	18,200
T68	(United States) Jason Dufner (c)	71-75-69-77=292	+4	18,200
T68	(Canada) Nick Taylor	73-73-75-71=292	+4	18,200
71	(United States) Brian Gaffney	71-73-78-71=293	+5	17,900
T72	(United States) J. J. Henry	75-70-74-75=294	+6	17,700
T72	(Japan) Koumei Oda	79-67-72-76=294	+6	17,700
T72	(United States) Sean O'Hair	75-68-73-78=294	+6	17,700
T75	(United States) Morgan Hoffmann	72-74-72-78=296	+8	17,450
T75	(Sweden) Carl Pettersson	76-70-75-75=296	+8	17,450
77	(England) James Morrison	69-74-76-78=297	+9	17,300
CUT	(Republic of Ireland) Pádraig Harrington (c)	76-71=147	+3	
CUT	(Canada) David Hearn	76-71=147	+3	
CUT	(United States) Zach Johnson	75-72=147	+3	
CUT	(United States) Kevin Kisner	75-72=147	+3	
CUT	(Scotland) Martin Laird	76-71=147	+3	
CUT	(Australia) Marc Leishman	79-68=147	+3	
CUT	(Republic of Ireland) Shane Lowry	78-69=147	+3	
CUT	(United States) Shaun Micheel (c)	74-73=147	+3	
CUT	(United States) Ryan Palmer	75-72=147	+3	
CUT	(South Africa) Rory Sabbatini	71-76=147	+3	
CUT	(Australia) John Senden	71-76=147	+3	
CUT	(Austria) Bernd Wiesberger	72-75=147	+3	
CUT	(United States) Daniel Berger	74-74=148	+4	
CUT	(Spain) Rafa Cabrera-Bello	73-75=148	+4	
CUT	(South Africa) Tim Clark	75-73=148	+4	
CUT	(United States) Ryan Helminen	76-72=148	+4	
CUT	(Scotland) Russell Knox	77-71=148	+4	
CUT	(United States) George McNeill	71-77=148	+4	
CUT	(United States) Kevin Na	74-74=148	+4	
CUT	(Scotland) Richie Ramsay	81-67=148	+4	
CUT	(United States) Jimmy Walker	75-73=148	+4	
CUT	(United States) Tiger Woods (c)	75-73=148	+4	
CUT	(South Korea) An Byeong-hun	75-74=149	+5	
CUT	(Australia) Steven Bowditch	74-75=149	+5	
CUT	(United States) Matt Dobyns	76-73=149	+5	
CUT	(England) Tommy Fleetwood	77-72=149	+5	
CUT	(United States) James Hahn	75-74=149	+5	
CUT	(Northern Ireland) Graeme McDowell	73-76=149	+5	
CUT	(Australia) Geoff Ogilvy	74-75=149	+5	
CUT	(United States) Pat Perez	74-75=149	+5	
CUT	(United States) Shawn Stefani	74-75=149	+5	
CUT	(United States) Brendon Todd	76-73=149	+5	
CUT	(England) Ross Fisher	76-74=150	+6	
CUT	(Spain) Miguel Ángel Jiménez	76-74=150	+6	
CUT	(Denmark) Søren Kjeldsen	72-78=150	+6	
CUT	(Scotland) Colin Montgomerie	78-72=150	+6	
CUT	(England) Ian Poulter	75-75=150	+6	
CUT	(United States) Grant Sturgeon	77-73=150	+6	
CUT	(England) Andy Sullivan	78-72=150	+6	
CUT	(Colombia) Camilo Villegas	75-75=150	+6	
CUT	(England) David Howell	73-78=151	+7	
CUT	(Spain) Pablo Larrazábal	79-72=151	+7	
CUT	(United States) Adam Rainaud	74-77=151	+7	
CUT	(Australia) Adam Scott	76-75=151	+7	
CUT	(United States) Bob Sowards	75-76=151	+7	
CUT	(England) Chris Wood	76-75=151	+7	
CUT	(Scotland) Stephen Gallacher	76-76=152	+8	
CUT	(United States) Brian Harman	78-74=152	+8	
CUT	(Thailand) Thongchai Jaidee	74-78=152	+8	
CUT	(United States) Davis Love III (c)	79-73=152	+8	
CUT	(Netherlands) Joost Luiten	80-72=152	+8	
CUT	(United States) Ben Polland	76-76=152	+8	
CUT	(United States) David Toms (c)	77-75=152	+8	
CUT	(United States) Cameron Tringale	78-74=152	+8	
CUT	(United States) Brett Jones	75-78=153	+9	
CUT	(France) Alexander Lévy	77-76=153	+9	
CUT	(United States) Ben Martin	76-77=153	+9	
CUT	(England) Eddie Pepperell	78-75=153	+9	
CUT	(United States) Rich Beem (c)	76-78=154	+10	
CUT	(United States) Matt Every	74-80=154	+10	
CUT	(South Africa) Johan Kok	77-77=154	+10	
CUT	(United States) John Daly (c)	73-82=155	+11	
CUT	(United States) Brent Snyder	76-79=155	+11	
CUT	(Argentina) Fabián Gómez	79-78=157	+13	
CUT	(United States) Charley Hoffman	79-78=157	+13	
CUT	(Scotland) Steven Young	77-81=158	+14	
CUT	(Northern Ireland) Darren Clarke	78-81=159	+15	
CUT	(United States) Charles Frost	76-83=159	+15	
CUT	(United States) Omar Uresti	77-82=159	+15	
CUT	(United States) Sean Dougherty	79-81=160	+16	
CUT	(United States) Jeff Olson	79-82=161	+17	
CUT	(United States) Mark Brooks (c)	84-78=162	+18	
CUT	(United States) Austin Peters	82-81=163	+19	
CUT	(United States) Brian Cairns	83-81=164	+20	
CUT	(United States) Daniel Venezio	89-76=165	+21	
CUT	(United States) Ryan Kennedy	79-90=169	+25	
CUT	(United States) Alan Morin	87-82=169	+25	
WD	(Germany) Alex Čejka	76	+4	
WD	(Wales) Jamie Donaldson	79	+7	

==== Scorecard ====
Final round

Hole	1	2	3	4	5	6	7	8	9	10	11	12	13	14	15	16	17	18
Par	4	5	3	4	5	4	3	4	4	4	5	3	4	4	4	5	3	4
(Australia) Day	−15	−16	−16	−16	−17	−18	−19	−18	−18	−18	−19	−19	−19	−20	−19	−20	−20	−20
(United States) Spieth	−13	−13	−14	−13	−14	−15	−15	−15	−14	−15	−15	−15	−16	−16	−16	−17	−17	−17
(South Africa) Grace	−12	−12	−13	−13	−14	−15	−16	−16	−16	−14	−14	−14	−15	−15	−14	−14	−15	−15
(England) Rose	−12	−12	−12	−12	−13	−14	−14	−14	−14	−15	−16	−16	−14	−14	−14	−15	−15	−14
(United States) Koepka	−7	−8	−8	−8	−8	−9	−9	−10	−10	−11	−12	−12	−11	−11	−12	−14	−13	−13
(India) Lahiri	−10	−10	−10	−10	−11	−12	−12	−12	−13	−12	−13	−13	−13	−13	−13	−14	−14	−13
(South Africa) Coetzee	−7	−7	−7	−6	−6	−7	−7	−7	−8	−9	−10	−10	−10	−10	−11	−12	−13	−12
(United States) Johnson	−5	−6	−5	−4	−5	−6	−7	−7	−7	−8	−10	−11	−11	−11	−11	−13	−12	−12
(United States) Kuchar	−8	−9	−9	−9	−10	−11	−11	−11	−10	−11	−13	−13	−12	−12	−12	−12	−12	−12

Cumulative tournament scores, relative to par

Eagle	Birdie	Bogey	Double bogey	Triple bogey+
