= Destination Kohler =

Hospitality and real estate arm of the Kohler Company

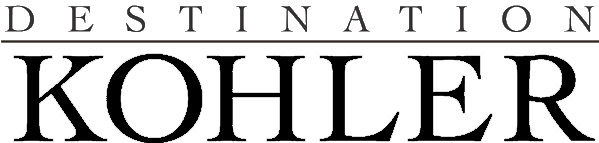
- Type: Tourism organization
- Parent organization: Kohler Company
- Subsidiaries: The American Club; Whistling Straits; Blackwolf Run
- Website: www.destinationkohler.com

Destination Kohler is the hospitality and real estate arm of the Kohler Company, and the tourism promotion agency for the Village of Kohler, Wisconsin.

== Properties ==
Destination Kohler owns and operates a resort in Kohler called The American Club. The American Club is a Forbes Five Star Resort and the only AAA 5-Diamond resort hotel in the entire Midwest. Destination Kohler also operates Inn On Woodlake, a 121-room hotel also located in the Village of Kohler west of The Shops at Woodlake. Named for a pair of Sandhill cranes that return each year to the property, the Sandhill Cabin is located in the Town of Mosel west of the Kohler-owned Whistling Straits golf course. Destination Kohler also operates Lodge Kohler, a AAA 4-Diamond 144-room hotel located in Green Bay in the Titletown area near Lambeau Field. The hotel boasts a restaurant, a cafe, and a Kohler Waters Spa.

The Kohler Company operates two golf courses in Wisconsin and a hotel in Scotland. The Whistling Straits golf course is located in the Town of Mosel north of Sheboygan, Wisconsin and is associated with The American Club and hosted the PGA Championship in 2004, 2010 and 2015, as well as the 2007 U.S. Senior Open and the 2021 Ryder Cup. Blackwolf Run, located in the Village of Kohler, features two 18-hole courses and has hosted the 1998 and 2012 U.S. Women's Open. A third course, The Baths, a 10-hole par-3 course, opened in 2021. The Old Course Hotel is a five-star hotel in St Andrews, Fife, Scotland.

Under the Destination Kohler umbrella, the Kohler Company owns and operates a number of restaurants, including the Immigrant Restaurant at the American Club, the Wisconsin Room, the Greenhouse, The Horse & Plow, and the Taverne on Woodlake. The company also operates restaurants at its two golf courses in Sheboygan County and at its private club Riverbend. Destination Kohler organizes a number of annual events including; Kohler Festival of Beer, Kohler Food & Wine Experience, In Celebration of Chocolate and Kohler Winterfest.

Kohler's hospitality group owns and operates Riverbend, a private membership club along the Sheboygan River on the west side of the Village of Kohler. River Wildlife is a 500-acre wilderness preserve along the Sheboygan River near the Blackwolf Run golf course and Riverbend. It includes a private rustic cabin and a recreational retreat. The Kohler Company owns and operates Kohler Stables in Kohler. Herbert V. Kohler, Jr. was the owner of Noble Flaire from 1984 until Flaire's death in 2006.

The Kohler Company also owns and operates Village Realty & Development, which guides the orderly development of more than 4.5 square miles of land within the Village of Kohler. Village Realty & Development is a full-service brokerage company that specializes in the sale of single-family homes, duplexes and condominiums throughout Sheboygan County. It also owns River Trails, a gated wooded area boarding the Black River in the Town of Wilson south of Sheboygan featuring log homes.

=== Failed proposals ===
In September 2011, the Kohler Company announced plans to building a luxury "tented forest" that would have included 15 permanent, canvas-covered structures on 247 acres of company property just north of Kohler-Andrae State Park. Most of the structures would house guests, but there would also be a spa tent and a guest-only restaurant and bar. In January 2012, Sheboygan County officials voted to grant a conditional use permit for the development but has since scrapped those plans.
