= Skincare (film) =

2024 film by Austin Peters

- Theatrical release poster
- Directed by: Austin Peters
- Written by: Sam Freilich; Deering Regan; Austin Peters
- Produced by: Jonathan Schwartz; Logan Lerman
- Starring: Elizabeth Banks; Lewis Pullman; Michaela Jaé Rodriguez; Luis Gerardo Méndez; Nathan Fillion
- Cinematography: Christopher Ripley
- Edited by: Laura Zempel
- Music by: Fatima Al Qadiri
- Production companies: Jalapeño Goat; Iervolino & Lady Bacardi Entertainment; WWPS.TV
- Distributed by: IFC Films
- Release date: August 16, 2024 (United States)
- Running time: 96 minutes
- Country: United States
- Language: English
- Box office: $456,590

Skincare is a 2024 American black comedy mystery thriller film directed by Austin Peters in his feature directorial debut, from a screenplay by Peters, Sam Freilich, and Deering Regan. The film stars Elizabeth Banks, Lewis Pullman, Michaela Jaé Rodriguez, Luis Gerardo Méndez, and Nathan Fillion. Set in Los Angeles in 2013, it follows Hope Goldman (Banks), a famed aesthetician who is about to launch her own line of skin products. When rival aesthetician Angel Vergara (Méndez) opens a boutique directly across from hers, she suspects him of stalking and harassing her. With the help of life coach Jordan Weaver (Pullman), Hope embarks on a quest to uncover the identity of the blackmailer, save her business, and clear her name.

Skincare was theatrically released in the United States on August 16, 2024, to mixed reviews from critics, though Banks received praise for her performance.

== Plot ==
In 2020, Hope Goldman is a famous aesthetician who runs a successful skincare studio in Los Angeles with her assistant and PR agent Marine. After taping a segment on The Brett & Kylie Show to promote the upcoming launch of her skincare line, Hope learns that another skincare clinic will open directly across from hers. Its owner, Angel Vergara, asks her not to park in her usual spot, now for his customers, further irritating her. Hope returns to her studio to work on her regular client Colleen, who introduces Hope to her young friend, Jordan Weaver, a self-proclaimed life coach.

At night, Hope receives a text message with a video of her in her studio, followed by an ominous phone call. The next day, Colleen tells Hope that someone sent an email from her address to all of her contacts claiming she is struggling emotionally, in debt, and sexually frustrated, leading several clients to cancel their appointments. Hope also learns that her segment on The Brett & Kylie Show has been replaced by an interview with Angel. Hope meets with Brett, who blames the producers for airing Angel's interview. Brett drives Hope home and tries to initiate sex with her, which she declines due to him being married. Brett then proposes that he will reinstate her segment on the show in exchange for fellatio. Hope reveals she has recorded their conversation, though she swears she has deleted it.

When Hope finds that her tires have been slashed, she calls the police and takes her car to a garage, where the owner, Armen, tells her that the slashed tires might be a warning. Hope shows him some of the explicit text messages she received, and he encourages her to acquire a gun. She later goes gun shopping, but ultimately buys a can of pepper spray instead. The next day, while Hope is performing a facial, a man arrives at the salon, saying he is there to have sex with her. Jordan forcibly removes him from the property. Hope discovers that someone has posted personal ads online inviting people for sex at her workplace. Due to Hope's tarnished reputation, she loses her major clients to Angel. Hope becomes convinced that Angel has been sabotaging her and tries to enlist the help of the police and her landlord, but both are incredulous.

The man who came to Hope's salon for sex is revealed to be an actor in Jordan's employ. As Hope and Jordan grow closer, she tells him that Angel continues to be a problem, and Jordan promises to deal with it. He goes to Angel's salon, but instead of confronting him, he proposes offering his life-coaching services to Angel's clients, which Angel declines. Jordan calls Hope and lies about having handled the problem. A man breaks into Hope's home, but she pepper sprays him and he flees. Hope frantically calls Jordan about the break-in (which she attributes to Angel), ordering Jordan to stay out of it, and shares the details with Armen, who promises to help. Meanwhile, a detective shows Hope surveillance footage depicting Jordan slashing her tires. Hope now realizes Jordan is the one sabotaging her. Armen goes to Angel's house and knocks him out, but trying to drive while injured, Armen is hit by a truck and killed.

Hope calls Jordan and demands he come to her office immediately. Shortly afterward, Jordan calls the police and provides an anonymous tip that Hope was responsible for attacking Angel. Hope then goes to Jordan's apartment and confronts him, which leads to a physical fight that ends with Hope striking Jordan's face with a baseball bat. That night, Hope finishes applying her makeup as the police arrive at her home and arrest her. Jordan is also arrested. Angel is shown to have recovered. The man who broke into Hope's house reassures Brett that she deleted the recording of their conversation from her phone. Hope's segment finally airs on The Brett & Kylie Show, though now dubbing her "the killer facialist".

== Cast ==
- Elizabeth Banks as Hope Goldman
- Lewis Pullman as Jordan
- Luis Gerardo Méndez as Angel Vergara
- Michaela Jaé Rodriguez as Marine
- Nathan Fillion as Brett Wright
- Erik Palladino as Armen
- John Billingsley as Jeff
- Jason Manuel Olazabal as Emerson
- Ella Balinska as Jessica
- Julie Chang as Kylie Curson
- Medalion Rahimi as Margaret
- Wendie Malick as Colleen
- John Pollono as Gun Store Noah

== Production ==
The film was loosely inspired by the case of Dawn DaLuise, who was arrested and later acquitted for a murder-for-hire plot against a rival beauty guru, Gabriel Suarez. In response to the movie, DaLuise told CNN that she was "disappointed" not to be consulted during filming, but also praised Banks' performance: "It was a bit of a rollercoaster ride, and it was enjoyable, but it wasn’t fact-based in any real way."

Cast members were announced in June 2023. Filming wrapped before the 2023 Writers Guild of America strike. IFC Films acquired the film's distribution rights in June 2024.

== Release ==
The film was released in the United States on August 16, 2024.

== Reception ==
=== Box office ===
In the United States and Canada, the film grossed $323,856 from 760 theaters on its opening weekend.

=== Critical response ===
On the review aggregator website Rotten Tomatoes, 69% of 86 critics' reviews are positive, with an average rating of 6.1/10. The website's consensus reads: "Skincare's script could use some rejuvenation, but Elizabeth Banks' superb performance gives this thriller its own kind of radiance." Metacritic, which uses a weighted average, assigned the film a score of 61 out of 100, based on 20 critics, indicating "generally favorable" reviews.

In his positive review, Keith Garlington of Keith & the Movies called it "a sleek and savvy crime thriller and black comedy hybrid" and that "the movie works thanks to a committed and perfectly tuned Elizabeth Banks whose textured performance is the glue that holds it all together."
