= Noble Flaire =

Morgan horse (1984-2006)

- Noble Flaire winning World Champion Park Harness.
- Discipline: Show horse
- Sire: Noble Command
- Sex: Stallion
- Foaled: January 28, 1984
- Died: July 28, 2006 (aged 22)
- Country: United States
- Color: Bay
- Owner: Herbert V. Kohler, Jr.

Noble Flaire (January 28, 1984 – July 28, 2006) was a Morgan horse sired by Noble Command. He won multiple titles at the Grand National and World Championship Morgan Horse Show before he retired in 1991, and has produced many progeny.

== Life history ==
Noble Flaire was bred by Bob Whitney and Judy Whitney of Cox's Creek, KY and foaled in 1984. He was sired by Noble Command and out of Lost River Sanfield. In 1984, Herbert V. Kohler, Jr. of Kohler Stables bought Noble Flaire for a record price for a weanling at the time, and that was the last time he changed hands for the remainder of his life. He made his show ring debut as a yearling colt in 1985. By the time he was two years old, he was already garnering attention. People would run to watch him perform, and throngs of people would follow him out of the ring after his victory pass just to see him trot.

By the time Noble Flaire retired from the show ring in 1991, he had won numerous World Championship titles including three Park Harness World Championships. This impressive horse died in 2006, but has left behind numerous progeny to carry on his name including the World Champions HVK Flaire Time, HVK Bell Flaire, Nostradamus, HVK Courageous Flaire, and HVK Vibrance, to name just a few.

== Titles ==
The titles Noble Flaire has won include:

- 1988, 1989 & 1991 World Champion Park Harness
- 1989 & 1991 World Champion Stallion
- 1989 & 1991 World Champion Senior Stallion
- 1989 & 1991 Grand National Five and Over Stallion
- 1986 World Champion Two-Year-Old Park Harness

== Pedigree ==
Pedigree of Noble Flaire, bay stallion, 1984
Sire Noble Command br. 1974 Morgan	Waseekas In Command br. 1965; Morgan	Waseekas Nocturne* b. 1955	Starfire*
Sire Noble Command br. 1974 Morgan	Waseekas In Command br. 1965; Morgan	Waseekas Nocturne* b. 1955	Upwey Benn Quietude*
Sire Noble Command br. 1974 Morgan	Waseekas In Command br. 1965; Morgan	Millers Adel b. 1950	Upwey Ben Don
Sire Noble Command br. 1974 Morgan	Waseekas In Command br. 1965; Morgan	Millers Adel b. 1950	Gertie G
Sire Noble Command br. 1974 Morgan	Waseekas Interlude b. 1967; Morgan	Waseekas Nocturne* b. 1955	Starfire*
Sire Noble Command br. 1974 Morgan	Waseekas Interlude b. 1967; Morgan	Waseekas Nocturne* b. 1955	Upwey Benn Quietude*
Sire Noble Command br. 1974 Morgan	Waseekas Interlude b. 1967; Morgan	Waseekas Thisizit ch. 1955	Parade
Sire Noble Command br. 1974 Morgan	Waseekas Interlude b. 1967; Morgan	Waseekas Thisizit ch. 1955	Upwey Benn Quietude*
Dam Lost River Sanfield b. 1975 Morgan	John Wayne Brady blk. 1970; Morgan	Jodys Ace of Spades blk. 1966	Springbrook Mansfield
Dam Lost River Sanfield b. 1975 Morgan	John Wayne Brady blk. 1970; Morgan	Jodys Ace of Spades blk. 1966	Jody Jean O
Dam Lost River Sanfield b. 1975 Morgan	John Wayne Brady blk. 1970; Morgan	Miranda Brady b. 1963	Payday
Dam Lost River Sanfield b. 1975 Morgan	John Wayne Brady blk. 1970; Morgan	Miranda Brady b. 1963	Lizzas Black Beauty
Dam Lost River Sanfield b. 1975 Morgan	Jasons Winett ch. 1966; Morgan	Devan Jason dk ch. 1953	Captain Fillmore
Dam Lost River Sanfield b. 1975 Morgan	Jasons Winett ch. 1966; Morgan	Devan Jason dk ch. 1953	Ladycap
Dam Lost River Sanfield b. 1975 Morgan	Jasons Winett ch. 1966; Morgan	Roubikate ch. 1950	Roubidoux
Dam Lost River Sanfield b. 1975 Morgan	Jasons Winett ch. 1966; Morgan	Roubikate ch. 1950	Kitty Hawk

* Noble Flaire is inbred 3S x 3S to the stallion Waseekas Nocturne, meaning that he appears third generation on the sire side of his pedigree twice. Therefore, he is inbred 4S x 4S to the stallion Starfire. He is also inbred 4S x 4S x 4S to the mare Upwey Benn Quietude, twice via Waseekas Nocturne and once via Waseekas Thisizit.

== See also ==
- Kohler Stables
- List of historical horses
