= 2004 PGA Championship =

Coordinates: 43.851°N 87.735°W

Tournament information
- Dates: August 12–15, 2004
- Location: Kohler, Wisconsin
- Courses: Whistling Straits, Straits Course
- Organized by: PGA of America
- Tours: PGA Tour; PGA European Tour; Japan Golf Tour

Statistics
- Par: 72
- Length: 7,514 yards (6,871 m)
- Field: 156 players, 73 after cut
- Cut: 145 (+1)
- Prize fund: $6,250,000 €5,071,152
- Winner's share: $1,125,000 €916,724

Champion
- (Fiji) Vijay Singh
- 280 (−8), playoff

Location in the United States
Location in Wisconsin

The 2004 PGA Championship was the 86th PGA Championship, played August 12–15 at the Straits Course of the Whistling Straits complex in Haven, Wisconsin (postal address Kohler). The purse was $6.25 million and the winner's share was $1.125 million.

Vijay Singh, the 1998 champion, earned his third and final major title in a three-hole aggregate playoff, defeating Justin Leonard and Chris DiMarco. At the time Singh, age 41, was third in the world rankings; the win moved him to #2 and he ascended to the top spot three weeks later, displacing Tiger Woods.

It was the first major championship at the expansive Straits Course, designed by Pete Dye and opened in 1998, which allowed high attendance and was highly profitable for the PGA of America. It set records with over 94,400 tickets sold and an overall attendance of 320,000 for the week. The overall economic impact was $76.9 million, shattering the previous record of $50.4 million in 2002, and nearly doubling that of 2003.

The PGA Championship returned just six years later, in 2010, displacing the more confined Sahalee Country Club near Seattle, which hosted in 1998, Singh's first major win. The admittance at Sahalee in 1998 was capped at 25,000 per day by the PGA of America. In early 2005, its chief executive officer, Jim Awtrey, cited the proximity to the 2010 Winter Olympics in Vancouver as the main reason for the retraction, and that Sahalee was targeted for 2012 to 2015 for another PGA Championship. Whistling Straits was awarded the 2010 event days later. The PGA of America has yet to commit to a return to Sahalee before 2028, but the championship returned to the West in 2020 at San Francisco.

== Field ==
1. All former PGA Champions.
2. Winners of the last five U.S. Opens.
3. Winners of the last five Masters.
4. Winners of the last five British Opens.
5. The 2003 Senior PGA Champion.
6. The low 15 scorers and ties in the 2003 PGA Championship.
7. The 25 low scorers in The 2004 PGA Club Professional Championship.
8. The 70 leaders in official money standings.
9. Members of the 2002 United States Ryder Cup Team.
10. Winners of tournaments co-sponsored or approved by the PGA Tour from the 2003 PGA Championship to the 2004 PGA Championship (does not include pro-am and team competitions).
11. The PGA of America reserves the right to invite additional players not included in the categories listed above.
12. The total field will be a maximum of 156 players. Vacancies will be filled by the first available player from the list of alternates (those below 70th place in official money standings).

Full eligibility list

== History of the PGA Championship at Whistling Straits ==
This was the first major championship held at Whistling Straits, and the Straits Course hosted the PGA Championship again in 2010, which also ended in a playoff, and 2015. It hosted the Ryder Cup in 2020. The course also hosted the U.S. Senior Open in 2007, won by Brad Bryant.

This was the second PGA Championship (and major) in the state of Wisconsin; 71 years earlier, the 1933 edition was played at Blue Mound in Wauwatosa, just west of Milwaukee. The PGA Tour stopped in the state regularly with the Greater Milwaukee Open (1968–2009), preceded by the Milwaukee Open Invitational (1955–1961).

== Course layout ==
Straits Course

| Hole | 1 | 2 | 3 | 4 | 5 | 6 | 7 | 8 | 9 | Out | 10 | 11 | 12 | 13 | 14 | 15 | 16 | 17 | 18 | In | Total |
|---|---|---|---|---|---|---|---|---|---|---|---|---|---|---|---|---|---|---|---|---|---|
| Yardage | 408 | 593 | 181 | 493 | 598 | 355 | 221 | 507 | 449 | 3,805 | 361 | 618 | 143 | 404 | 373 | 518 | 569 | 223 | 500 | 3,709 | 7,514 |
| Par | 4 | 5 | 3 | 4 | 5 | 4 | 3 | 4 | 4 | 36 | 4 | 5 | 3 | 4 | 4 | 4 | 5 | 3 | 4 | 36 | 72 |

== Round summaries ==
=== First round ===
Thursday, August 12, 2004

Led by Darren Clarke, 39 players broke par in Thursday opening round. Clarke birdied the first four holes and finished at 7-under-par 65. It was the lowest score under par in the first round of a major since Chris DiMarco had a 7-under 65 at the 2001 Masters. He was one stroke better than Justin Leonard and Ernie Els.

| Place | Player | Score | To par |
|---|---|---|---|
| 1 | (Northern Ireland) Darren Clarke | 65 | −7 |
| T2 | (South Africa) Ernie Els | 66 | −6 |
| T2 | (United States) Justin Leonard | 66 | −6 |
| T4 | (United States) Briny Baird | 67 | −5 |
| T4 | (England) Luke Donald | 67 | −5 |
| T4 | (Fiji) Vijay Singh | 67 | −5 |
| T4 | (United States) Scott Verplank | 67 | −5 |
| T8 | (Trinidad and Tobago) Stephen Ames | 68 | −4 |
| T8 | (Australia) Stuart Appleby | 68 | −4 |
| T8 | (South Korea) K. J. Choi | 68 | −4 |
| T8 | (United States) Chris DiMarco | 68 | −4 |
| T8 | (United States) Jay Haas | 68 | −4 |
| T8 | (Republic of Ireland) Pádraig Harrington | 68 | −4 |
| T8 | (Australia) Geoff Ogilvy | 68 | −4 |
| T8 | (United States) Tim Petrovic | 68 | −4 |
| T8 | (United States) Loren Roberts | 68 | −4 |

=== Second round ===
Friday, August 13, 2004

Justin Leonard posted a 3-under 69 and Vijay Singh carded a 4-under 68 to share a one stroke lead at 9 under midway through the 86th PGA Championship. Opening round leader Darren Clarke shot a 1-under 71 and is tied for third with Ernie Els and Briny Baird. Tiger Woods made two straight birdies on 16 and 17 to avoid missing his first cut in 128 events. Miguel Ángel Jiménez, who shot the low round of the day of 65, ended in a tie for 13th at 3-under.

| Place | Player | Score | To par |
|---|---|---|---|
| T1 | (United States) Justin Leonard | 66-69=135 | −9 |
| T1 | (Fiji) Vijay Singh | 67-68=135 | −9 |
| T3 | (United States) Briny Baird | 67-69=136 | −8 |
| T3 | (Northern Ireland) Darren Clarke | 65-71=136 | −8 |
| T3 | (South Africa) Ernie Els | 66-70=136 | −8 |
| 6 | (United States) Chris DiMarco | 68-70=138 | −6 |
| T7 | (Trinidad and Tobago) Stephen Ames | 68-71=139 | −5 |
| T7 | (South Korea) K. J. Choi | 68-71=139 | −5 |
| T7 | (Republic of Ireland) Pádraig Harrington | 68-71=139 | −5 |
| T7 | (United States) Chris Riley | 69-70=139 | −5 |

=== Third round ===
Saturday, August 14, 2004

Vijay Singh shot 69 to reach 12 under par as he tried to add a third major title to his 1998 PGA Championship and 2000 Masters. Justin Leonard carded 70 and was at 11 under. Leonard, who had a two-shot lead after making a 6-foot birdie on the 12th, bogeyed Nos. 15 and 18 to keep him one behind. Briny Baird, the leader at one point, pulled his tee shot over the cliff left of the par-3 17th and wound up with a triple bogey to knocked him out of contention. He wound up with a 75 and was seven shots behind.

| Place | Player | Score | To par |
|---|---|---|---|
| 1 | (Fiji) Vijay Singh | 67-68-69=204 | −12 |
| 2 | (United States) Justin Leonard | 66-69-70=205 | −11 |
| T3 | (Trinidad and Tobago) Stephen Ames | 68-71-69=208 | −8 |
| T3 | (Northern Ireland) Darren Clarke | 65-71-72=208 | −8 |
| T3 | (South Africa) Ernie Els | 66-70-72=208 | −8 |
| T3 | (United States) Phil Mickelson | 69-72-67=208 | −8 |
| T3 | (United States) Chris Riley | 69-70-69=208 | −8 |
| 8 | (United States) Chris DiMarco | 68-70-71=209 | −7 |
| T9 | (England) Brian Davis | 70-71-69=210 | −6 |
| T9 | (United States) Loren Roberts | 68-72-70=210 | −6 |

=== Final round ===
Sunday, August 15, 2004

An exciting final round filled with missed opportunities led to a three-man playoff between Vijay Singh, Chris DiMarco and Justin Leonard. Ernie Els missed the playoff by one stroke, thanks to a bogey at No. 18, and completed a disheartening season of near-misses in the majors. He finished fourth, tied with Chris Riley who also bogeyed No. 18. Els finished second in the Masters, second in the British Open and ninth in the U.S. Open.

Phil Mickelson also had a chance to get into the playoff, needing a birdie at the 72nd hole. Mickelson however took bogey and added a sixth-place finish to his memorable run at the majors in 2004. Mickelson won the Masters, took second in the U.S. Open and placed third in the British Open. K.J. Choi also had a chance to get into the playoff with a birdie, but also bogeyed the 72nd hole to finish two strokes behind. Tiger Woods bogeyed two of the first four holes and wound up with a 73, his worst finish in the majors this year, and extended his streak to 10 majors without winning, which was the longest drought of his career at that time. He won the next major, his fourth green jacket at the Masters, in 2005.

Leonard, playing in the final group at the PGA Championship for the third time, took a two-shot lead with five holes to play with an 18-foot (5.5 m) birdie putt on 13. Leonard missed four putts inside 12 feet (3.7 m) down the stretch including a 12-foot par putt on No. 18 which would have given him his second major championship. DiMarco, the only player in the final nine groups to break par, had an 18-foot birdie putt to win on the 72nd hole that he left short. He also lost in a playoff in the next major, to Woods at Augusta, and ended his career without a major victory.

| Place | Player | Score | To par | Money ($) |
|---|---|---|---|---|
| T1 | (United States) Chris DiMarco | 68-70-71-71=280 | −8 | Playoff |
| T1 | (United States) Justin Leonard | 66-69-70-75=280 | −8 | Playoff |
| T1 | (Fiji) Vijay Singh | 67-68-69-76=280 | −8 | Playoff |
| T4 | (South Africa) Ernie Els | 66-70-72-73=281 | −7 | 267,500 |
| T4 | (United States) Chris Riley | 69-70-69-73=281 | −7 | 267,500 |
| T6 | (South Korea) K. J. Choi | 68-71-73-70=282 | −6 | 196,000 |
| T6 | (Republic of Ireland) Paul McGinley | 69-74-70-69=282 | −6 | 196,000 |
| T6 | (United States) Phil Mickelson | 69-72-67-74=282 | −6 | 196,000 |
| T9 | (Australia) Robert Allenby | 71-70-72-70=283 | −5 | 152,000 |
| T9 | (Trinidad and Tobago) Stephen Ames | 68-71-69-75=283 | −5 | 152,000 |
| T9 | (United States) Ben Crane | 70-74-69-70=283 | −5 | 152,000 |
| T9 | (Australia) Adam Scott | 71-71-69-72=283 | −5 | 152,000 |

==== Scorecard ====
Final round

| Hole | 1 | 2 | 3 | 4 | 5 | 6 | 7 | 8 | 9 | 10 | 11 | 12 | 13 | 14 | 15 | 16 | 17 | 18 |
|---|---|---|---|---|---|---|---|---|---|---|---|---|---|---|---|---|---|---|
| Par | 4 | 5 | 3 | 4 | 5 | 4 | 3 | 4 | 4 | 4 | 5 | 3 | 4 | 4 | 4 | 5 | 3 | 4 |
| (Fiji) Singh | −12 | −12 | −12 | −10 | −10 | −10 | −9 | −9 | −9 | −9 | −9 | −9 | −9 | −9 | −8 | −8 | −8 | −8 |
| (United States) DiMarco | −7 | −7 | −7 | −7 | −7 | −7 | −7 | −7 | −8 | −8 | −9 | −10 | −10 | −10 | −9 | −8 | −8 | −8 |
| (United States) Leonard | −11 | −11 | −12 | −12 | −12 | −12 | −11 | −11 | −11 | −10 | −10 | −10 | −11 | −10 | −10 | −9 | −9 | −8 |
| (South Africa) Els | −8 | −8 | −7 | −6 | −7 | −7 | −7 | −7 | −8 | −7 | −7 | −7 | −7 | −6 | −7 | −8 | −8 | −7 |
| (United States) Riley | −8 | −8 | −7 | −7 | −7 | −7 | −7 | −7 | −6 | −6 | −7 | −7 | −8 | −8 | −8 | −8 | −8 | −7 |
| (South Korea) Choi | −4 | −4 | −5 | −5 | −6 | −6 | −7 | −7 | −7 | −6 | −6 | −6 | −7 | −7 | −7 | −7 | −7 | −6 |
| (Republic of Ireland) McGinley | −4 | −4 | −4 | −4 | −5 | −5 | −4 | −3 | −4 | −4 | −5 | −5 | −5 | −6 | −5 | −6 | −6 | −6 |
| (United States) Mickelson | −8 | −8 | −6 | −6 | −7 | −7 | −7 | −7 | −6 | −6 | −7 | −7 | −7 | −7 | −7 | −7 | −7 | −6 |
| (Australia) Scott | −5 | −6 | −6 | −5 | −5 | −5 | −4 | −5 | −5 | −5 | −5 | −5 | −5 | −5 | −5 | −5 | −5 | −5 |
| (Trinidad and Tobago) Ames | −8 | −8 | −9 | −9 | −10 | −9 | −8 | −9 | −9 | −9 | −9 | −8 | −7 | −6 | −5 | −5 | −5 | −5 |
| (Northern Ireland) Clarke | −8 | −8 | −8 | −8 | −8 | −6 | −6 | −7 | −7 | −6 | −7 | −7 | −7 | −7 | −6 | −5 | −4 | −4 |
| (England) Davis | −6 | −6 | −6 | −6 | −6 | −7 | −7 | −8 | −7 | −7 | −6 | −5 | −6 | −6 | −4 | −4 | −4 | −4 |

Cumulative tournament scores, relative to par

| Birdie | Bogey | Double bogey |

=== Playoff ===
After 72 holes, Singh, DiMarco and Leonard were tied on 8 under par, requiring a three-hole aggregate playoff, over the 10th, 17th, and 18th holes. Singh, who had yet to make a birdie during the day, got off to fast start with a birdie at the 10th hole, a short par-4 at 361 yards (330 m). Singh nearly drove the green and left a simple pitch to 6 feet (1.8 m), while DiMarco and Leonard both made par.

Singh then laced a 3-iron to within 6 feet on the 236-yard (216 m) par-3 17th, but missed the putt and all three men made par. Leonard and DiMarco needed to gain a stroke on Singh on the par-4 18th and neither came close — DiMarco in a bunker, Leonard so far away that he used a wedge to chip on the green. Neither finished the hole, and Singh's par secured his second PGA Championship and third career major. His 76 on Sunday was the highest final-round score ever by a PGA champion.

| Place | Player | Score | To par | Money ($) |
|---|---|---|---|---|
| 1 | (Fiji) Vijay Singh | 3-3-4=10 | −1 | 1,125,000 |
| T2 | (United States) Chris DiMarco | 4-3-x=x | x | 800,000 |
| T2 | (United States) Justin Leonard | 4-3-x=x | x | 800,000 |

==== Scorecard ====
Playoff

| Hole | 10 | 17 | 18 |
|---|---|---|---|
| Par | 4 | 3 | 4 |
| (Fiji) Singh | −1 | −1 | −1 |
| (United States) DiMarco | E | E | x |
| (United States) Leonard | E | E | x |

Cumulative playoff scores, relative to par

== Quotes ==
It looked ugly, but it's the prettiest one, I think.

— Vijay Singh on his third major championship win.

It was sad to see someone win it the way I did. The putter kind of fell asleep. I got new life when (Leonard) missed the putt on the last hole.

— Vijay Singh on his final round.

This makes my year. I think this is the biggest accomplishment I've ever had in my whole career.

— Vijay Singh on his season that eventually won him PGA Player of the Year.

I missed about four putts inside 10 feet on the back nine. It's pretty hard to win a golf tournament, much less a major, when you do that.

— Justin Leonard on his putting woes on the back nine.

I didn't win, and it's very disappointing. It's not like I haven't traveled down this road before. And hopefully, it will be the same result.

— Tiger Woods after his tenth straight major without a win.

It's been a great year for me in the majors. I feel like I'm really onto something good, and I'm looking forward to next year. I'm sorry we have such a long way to go.

— Phil Mickelson on a year where he finished in the top six at all four majors.
