= Whistling Straits =

Golf course in Kohler, Wisconsin

Coordinates: 43.851°N 87.735°W

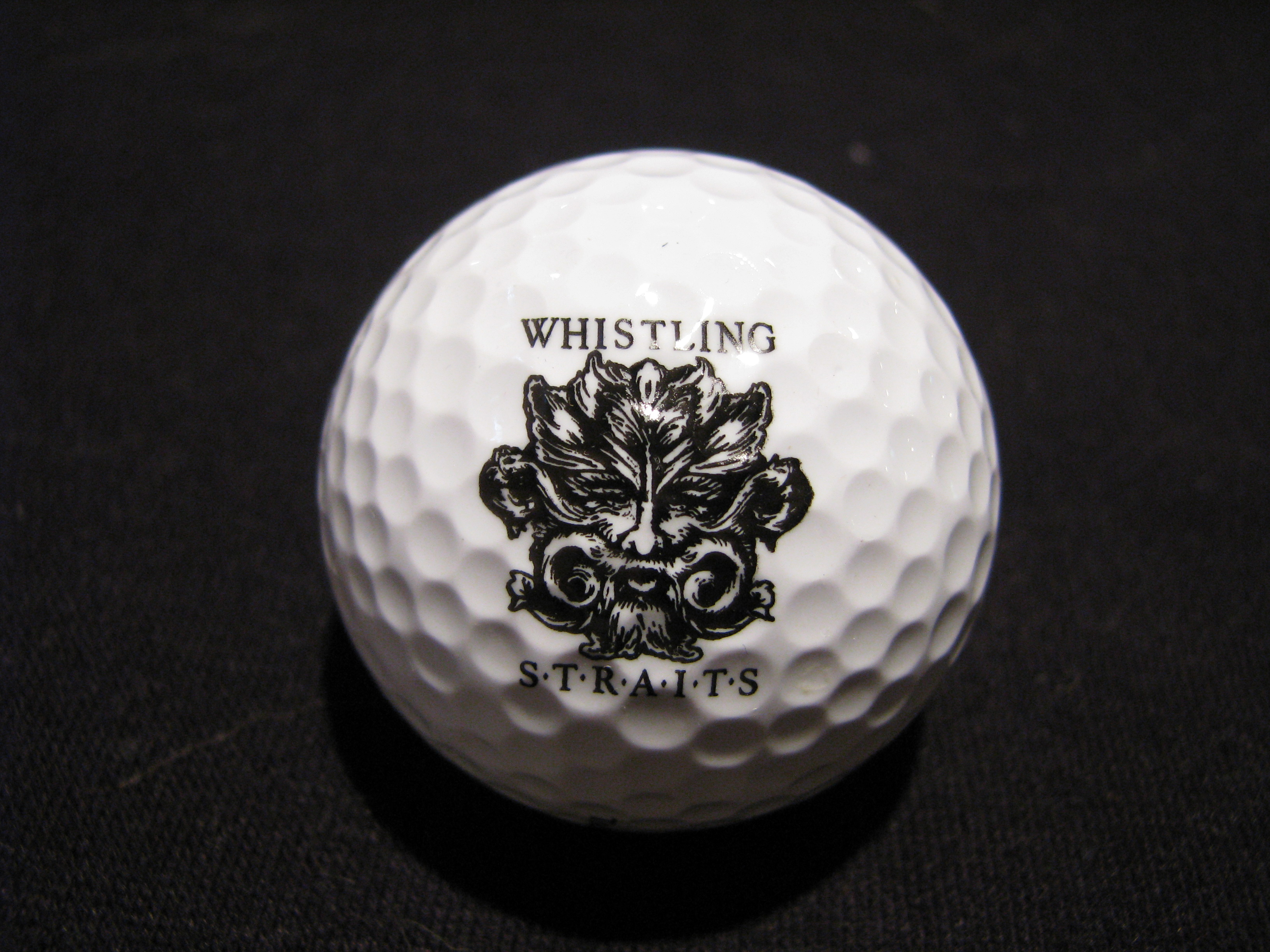
- Interactive map of Whistling Straits

Club information
- Location: Town of Mosel, at Haven, Sheboygan County, Wisconsin
- Established: 1998, 28 years ago
- Type: Public
- Owner: Kohler Company
- Operator: The American Club
- Total holes: 36
- Tournaments: PGA Championship (2004, 2010, 2015); U.S. Senior Open (2007), Ryder Cup (2021)
- Website: Whistling Straits

Straits Course
- Designed by: Pete and Alice Dye
- Par: 72
- Length: 7,790 yards (7,123 m)
- Course rating: 77.2
- Slope rating: 152

Irish Course
- Designed by: Pete and Alice Dye
- Par: 72
- Length: 7,201 yards (6,585 m)
- Course rating: 75.6
- Slope rating: 146
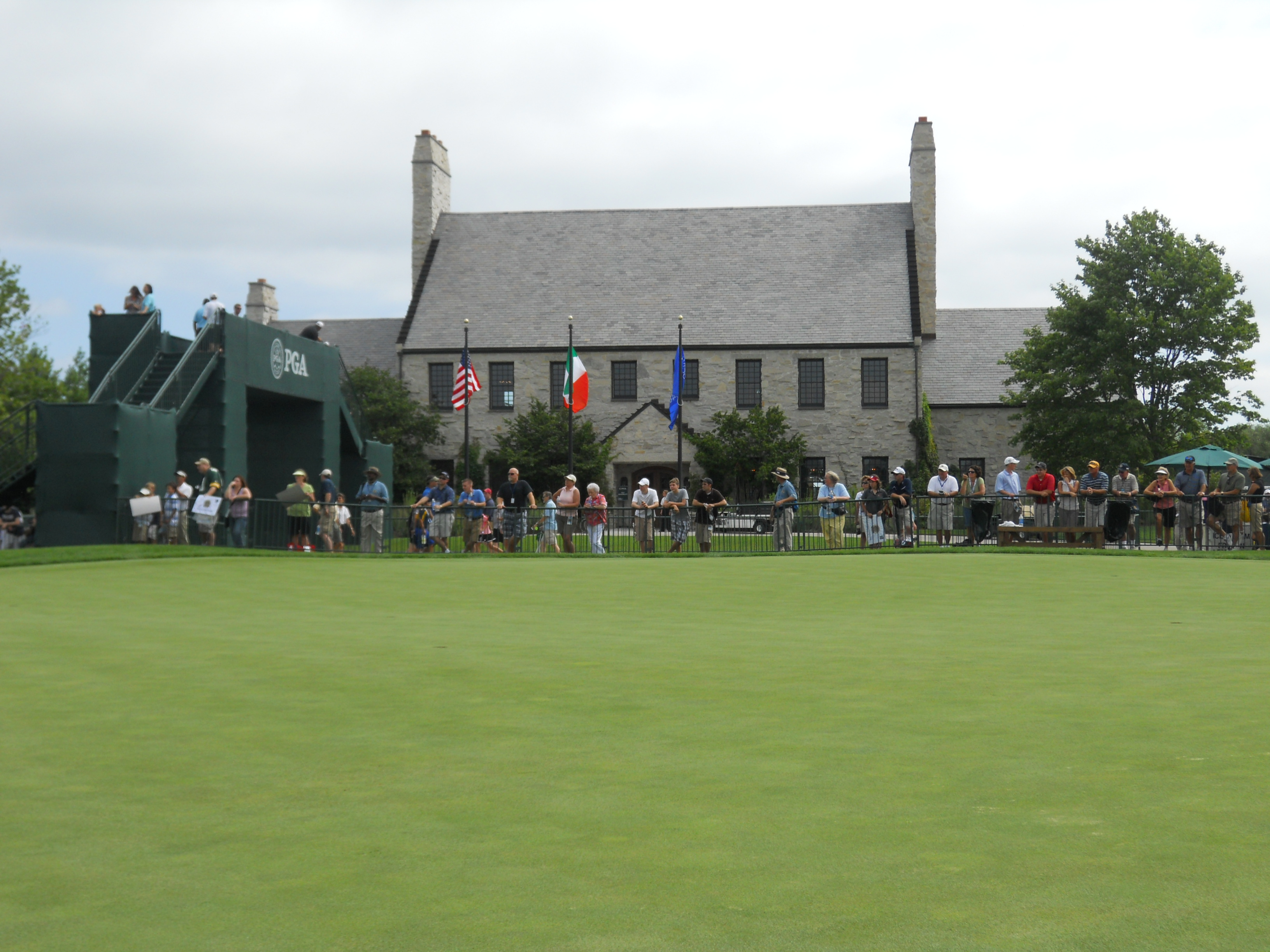
- Clubhouse during 2010 PGA Championship

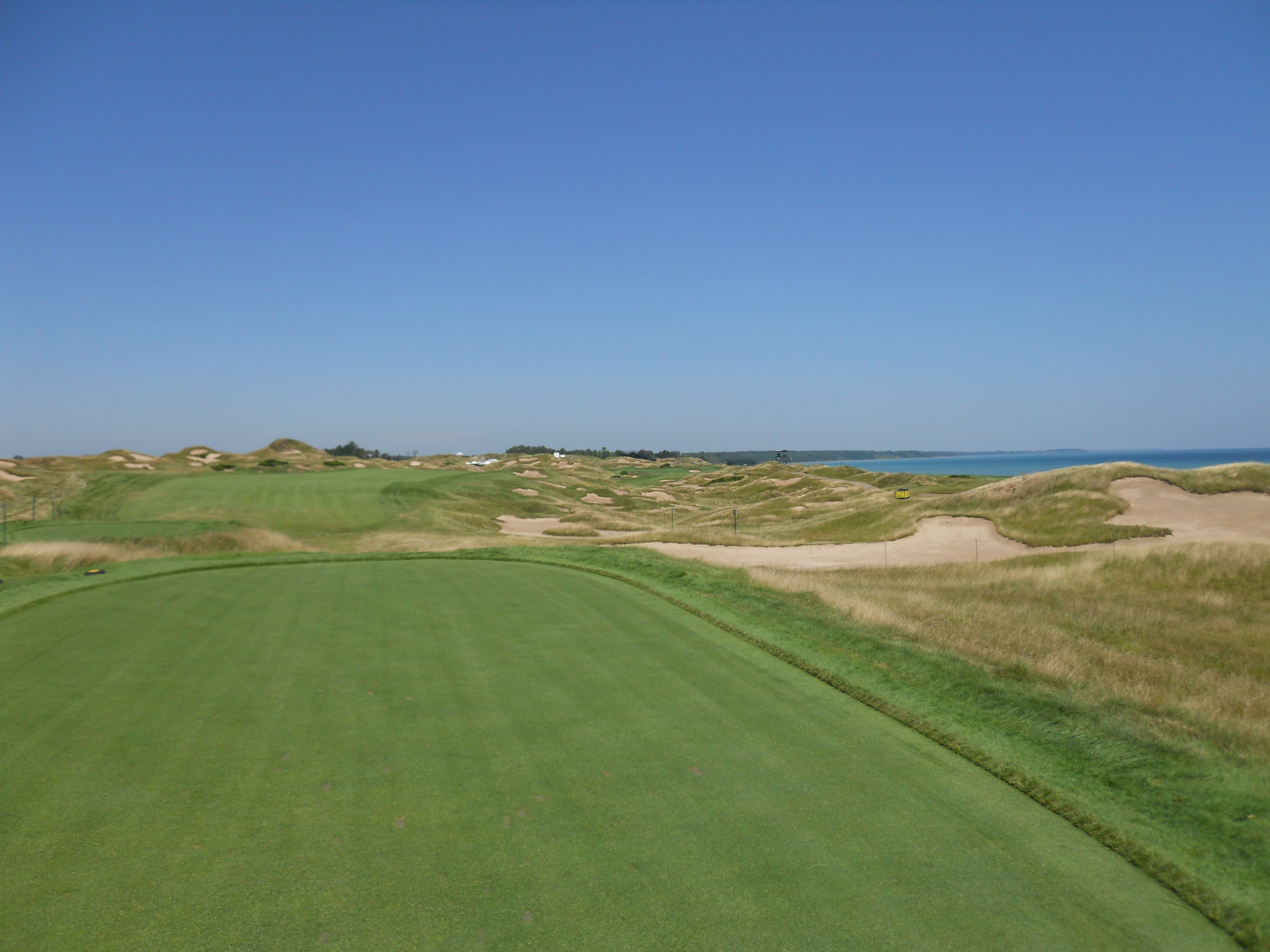
11 Fairway on the Straits Course

Whistling Straits is one of two 36-hole links-style golf courses associated with Destination Kohler, a luxury golf resort owned and operated by the Kohler Company in Kohler, Wisconsin. The other course is Blackwolf Run, located in the Village of Kohler. The Whistling Straits complex is located north of Sheboygan, in the unincorporated community of Haven in the Town of Mosel in Sheboygan County. Whistling Straits is separated into two courses, the Straits Course and the Irish Course.

The courses at Whistling Straits (and Blackwolf Run) were designed by Pete and Alice Dye.

== Straits Course ==
The Straits Course is the flagship course at Whistling Straits. As of 2012, it had a length of 7,790 yards (7,123 m) and a par of 72. It hosted the 2004 PGA Championship, the 2007 U.S. Senior Open, and the 2010 PGA Championship. The course hosted the PGA Championship for a third time in 2015 and the 2021 Ryder Cup was held on the course with the United States winning 19–9.

The Straits Course replicates the ancient seaside links courses of the United Kingdom and Ireland. Nestled along a two-mile (3 km) stretch of Lake Michigan shoreline, the course has eight holes hugging the lake, a flock of Scottish Blackface sheep, three stone bridges, and elevation changes of approximately 80 feet (24 m). It has vast rolling greens, deep pot bunkers, grass-topped dunes and winds that sweep in off the lake. Being a coastal links-style course, there are few large trees or woods on the course, which is open and exposed to wind and the elements.

Before the course was built, the property was an abandoned airfield called Camp Haven (1949–1959), with a stream running through the middle. Wisconsin Electric purchased the property in the 1970s and attempted to build the Haven Nuclear Power Plant on the property, but its construction was opposed by local residents and Wisconsin Power & Light (Sheboygan County's major electric utility), and the company never built the plant. It then sold the property to the Kohler Company in the early 1990s.

Kohler Company CEO Herbert Kohler hired the Dyes to be the course architects. During construction, the original landscape of the Straits Course was covered with about 800,000 cubic yards (610,000 m^{3}) of soil and sand.

Hiroshi Iwata holds the course record for the Straits Course with a 63 in the second round of the 2015 PGA Championship.

== Irish Course ==
The second course at Whistling Straits is the Irish Course, an inland grass-and-dune layout. It is a par-72 course that features 7,201 yards (6,585 m) of golf from the longest tees, with a course rating of 75.6 and a slope rating of 146. Also designed by Pete Dye, it opened for play in 2000. The course record of 67 was shot by Mike Frechette in 2007 and then matched by Garret Buckley at the 2014 Whistling Straits Intercollegiate.

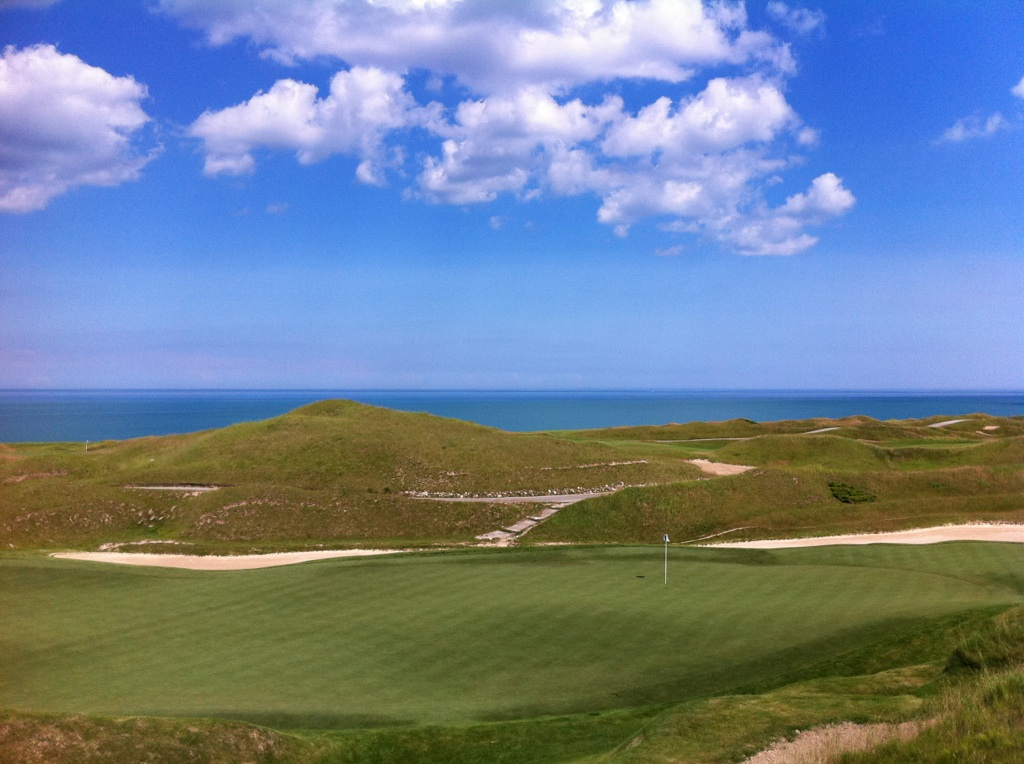
View of Lake Michigan from the Irish Course

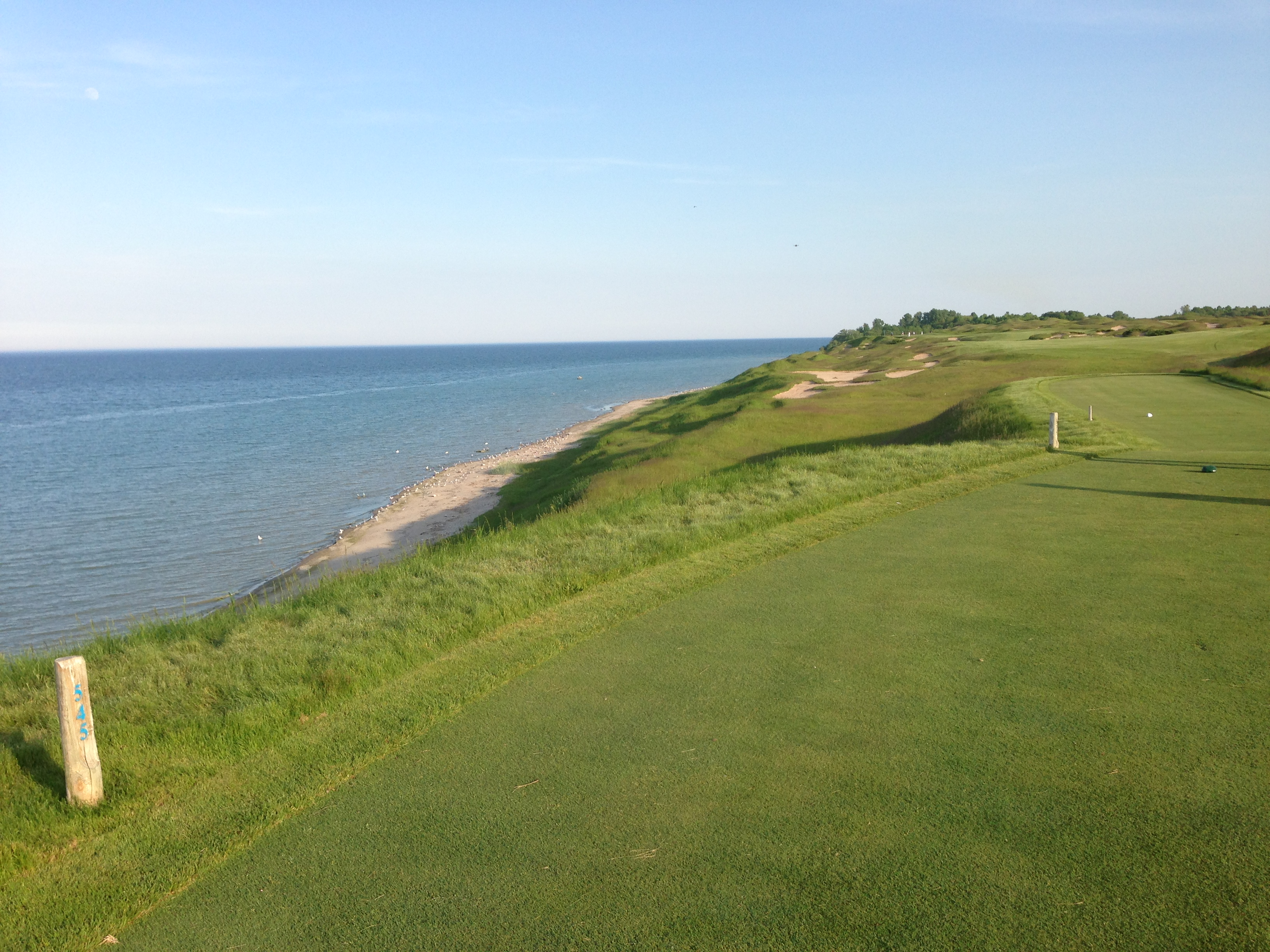
Par 5 along Lake Michigan

== Major tournaments hosted ==
Year	Tournament	Winner	Score	Margin of victory	Runner(s)-up	Winner's share ($)
2004	PGA Championship	(Fiji) Vijay Singh	280 (−8)	Playoff	(United States) Justin Leonard (United States) Chris DiMarco	1,125,000
2007	U.S. Senior Open	(United States) Brad Bryant	282 (−6)	3 strokes	(United States) Ben Crenshaw	470,000
2010	PGA Championship	(Germany) Martin Kaymer	277 (−11)	Playoff	(United States) Bubba Watson	1,350,000
2015	PGA Championship	(Australia) Jason Day	268 (−20)	3 strokes	(United States) Jordan Spieth	1,800,000
2021	Ryder Cup	United States	19−9		Europe	n/a

== Course layout ==
=== Straits Course ===
Hole	Name	Yards	Par	Hole	Name	Yards	Par
1	Outward Bound	408	4	10	Voyageur	361	4
2	Cross Country	593	5	11	Sand Box	563	5
3	O' Man	181	3	12	Pop Up	143	3
4	Glory	489	4	13	Cliff Hanger	404	4
5	Snake	603	5	14	Widow's Watch	397	4
6	Gremlin's Ear	355	4	15	Grand Strand	518	4
7	Shipwreck	221	3	16	Endless Bite	569	5
8	On the Rocks	507	4	17	Pinched Nerve	223	3
9	Down and Dirty	446	4	18	Dyeabolical	520	4
Out		3,803	36	In		3,698	36
Source:				Total		7,501	72

Previous course lengths for major championships:

- 7,514 yards (6,871 m) – par 72, 2010 PGA Championship
- 7,514 yards (6,871 m) – par 72, 2004 PGA Championship

=== Irish Course ===
Hole	Name	Yards	Par	Hole	Name	Yards	Par
1	High Ground	400	4	10	Shepherd's Post	398	4
2	Giants Leap	372	4	11	Lamp Chop	208	3
3	Sleeper	147	3	12	Highland Trek	413	4
4	Sandbanks	489	4	13	Blind Man's Bluff	183	3
5	Devil's Elbow	570	5	14	Tullamore Dew	564	5
6	Mulligan's Watch	160	3	15	Frog Water	479	4
7	Troll	372	4	16	Deep Dye	474	4
8	Garden Creek	555	5	17	Irish Mist	375	4
9	Last Gaspe	484	4	18	Black and Tan	558	5
Out		3,549	36	In		3,652	36
Source:				Total		7,201	72
