= American Club (Kohler, Wisconsin) =

- U.S. National Register of Historic Places
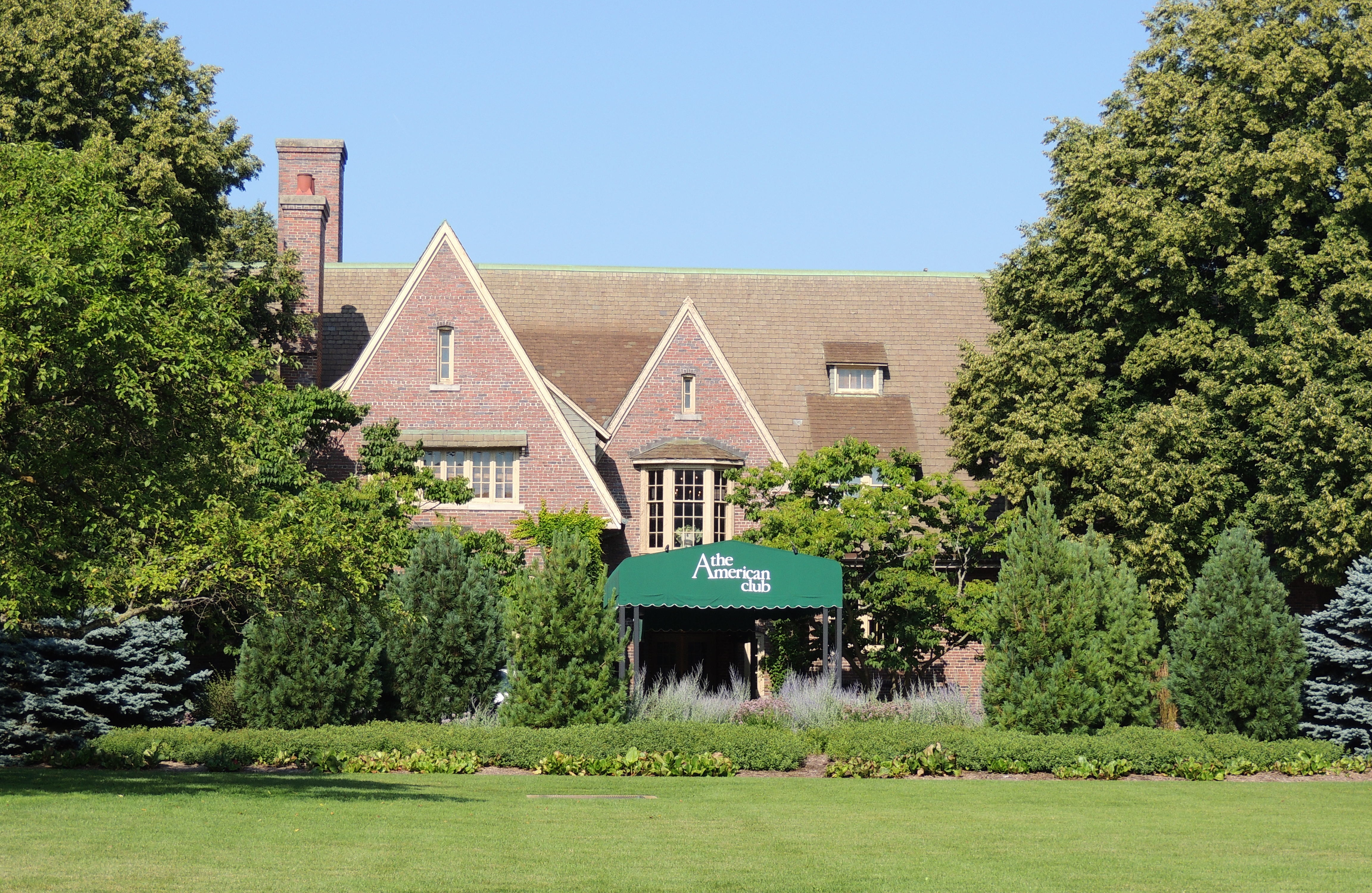
- The American Club in August 2025.
- Location: 419 Highland Drive; Kohler, Wisconsin; United States
- Coordinates: 43°44′23″N 87°46′51″W
- Area: 4 acres (1.6 ha)
- Built: 1924
- Architect: Richard Philipp
- Architectural style: Tudor Revival
- NRHP reference No.: 78000141
- Added to NRHP: May 22, 1978

The American Club is a luxury spa and resort located in Kohler, Wisconsin. It is owned and operated by the Kohler Company. It has received various awards, including the Top 100 Golf Resorts by Conde Nast Traveler magazine, and is the Midwest's only AAA Five Diamond Resort Hotel. It is now part of Destination Kohler. The American Club is a member of Historic Hotels of America, the official program of the National Trust for Historic Preservation.

== Site ==
The American Club is located in the former company town Kohler, Wisconsin, which was founded by Walter J. Kohler, the son of Kohler Co. founder John Michael Kohler. Initially built around the manufacturing plant to meet the needs of the growing workforce it became an independently functioning village and was incorporated as such in 1912 as the Village of Kohler. The famous landscape architect Frederick Law Olmsted was involved into the planning of the village layout.

== Architecture ==
In 1924, or even a couple years prior, the planning was commissioned to architect Richard Philipp of Brust & Philipp in Milwaukee, Wisconsin. He used the Tudor Revival-style as an inspiration.

== History ==
The American Club hotel was built in 1918 to house the Kohler Company's immigrant workers.

Nearby Whistling Straits and Blackwolf Run golf courses are affiliated with The American Club.

It was listed on the National Register of Historic Places in 1978.

== See also ==
- List of Historic Hotels of America
