= Blackwolf Run =

Golf course in Wisconsin, United States

Coordinates: 43.725°N 87.771°W

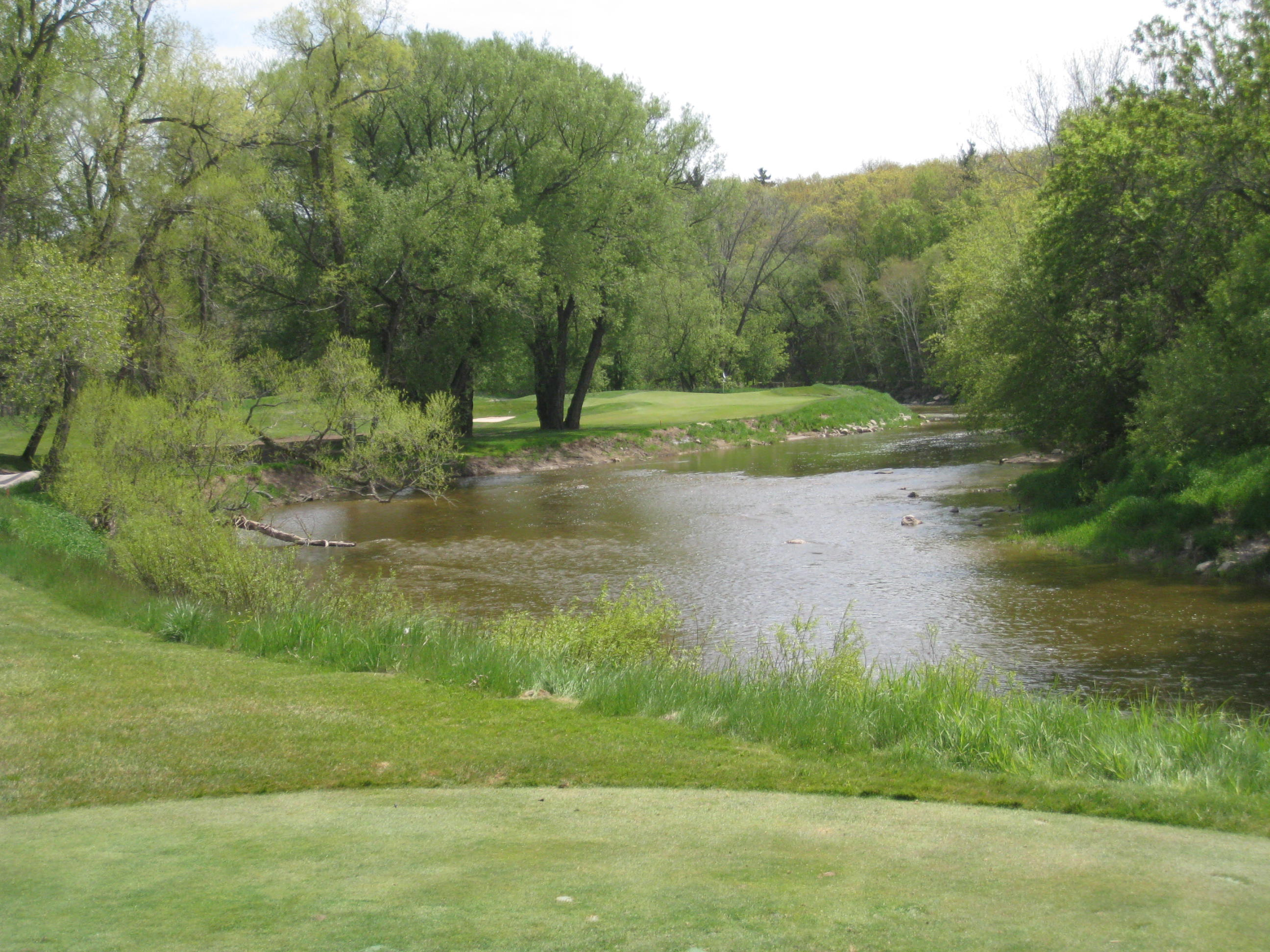
- River Course in May 2008
- Interactive map of Blackwolf Run

Club information
- Location: Kohler, Wisconsin, U.S.
- Established: 1988
- Type: Public
- Owner: Kohler Company
- Operator: The American Club
- Total holes: 36
- Tournaments: U.S. Women's Open: 1998, 2012
- Website: Blackwolf Run

Meadow Valleys Course
- Designed by: Pete Dye
- Par: 72
- Length: 7,314 yd (6,688 m)
- Course rating: 75.1
- Slope rating: 145

River Course
- Designed by: Pete Dye
- Par: 72
- Length: 7,404 yd (6,770 m)
- Course rating: 76.2
- Slope rating: 151

Blackwolf Run is a golf course complex in Kohler, Wisconsin. It is one of two golf destinations associated with The American Club, owned by a subsidiary of the Kohler Company. The other is the Whistling Straits complex in nearby Haven.

Opened in 1988 with 18 holes, Blackwolf Run was named that year's "Best New Public Course" by Golf Digest magazine, and has continued to accumulate awards and honors including regular ranking on the list of "America's 100 Greatest Golf Courses" by Golf Digest and the "Top 100 You Can Play" by Golf Magazine. Nine holes were added in 1989 and it became a 36-hole facility in 1990. Most recently, both the River and Meadow Valleys courses received the coveted 5-Star ranking from Golf Digest.

== River Course ==
The River Course is an 18-hole layout along a glacial river basin that features a 7,404 yards (6,770 m) of golf from the longest tees for a par of 72. The course has a rating of 76.2, and it has a slope rating of 151. Designed by noted course architect Pete Dye, the course uses half of the original holes opened in 1988 and is played on bent grass. The river is the meandering Sheboygan River, which flows eastward to Lake Michigan at Sheboygan.

== Meadow Valleys Course ==
The Meadow Valleys Course is an 18-hole layout at 7,250 yards (6,629 m) for a par of 72. Also designed by Dye, the course rating is 75.1, with a slope of 145.

== The Baths ==
The Baths at Blackwolf Run is a 10-hole par-3 course that opened in June 2021. This course was designed by Chris Lutzke, a protégé of Pete Dye, who was on the crew who originally built Blackwolf Run in the late 1980s. Attached to the 10th green is an 18-hole putting course, which takes place over two acres and features different locations each week. The Baths has also played host to nighttime golf under stadium lights, and features a full bar and a food truck.

== Purebred Farm ==
Purebred Farm is a 14-hole golf course that is currently under construction at Blackwolf Run, which was formally announced with ground broken in the fall of 2025. The course is designed by King-Collins Dormer, their first collaboration with Kohler Company. The routing, intended to provide a near three-hour round of golf, is set to open in the summer of 2027. The course features par-3's, par-4's and par-5's, and a food and beverage station in a renovated Tomczyk Cabin which has sat on the site since the 19th century.

== U.S. Women's Open ==
The Original Championship Course (holes 10–18 on the Meadow Valleys Course and holes 1-4 and 14–18 on the River Course) was used for the 1998 U.S. Women's Open, won by Se Ri Pak in an extended playoff. The composite course uses the original 18 holes at Blackwolf Run, which were split between the two courses when the second 18 holes were added. The championship course employs the back nine from the Meadow Valleys course and the first four and last five holes from the River course; in 1998 it was set at par 71 with a length of 6,412 yards (5,863 m). The same layout was used for the 2012 U.S. Women's Open, but extended by over 500 yards (460 m) and at par 72. The length for 2012 was 6,954 yards (6,359 m) at an approximate elevation of 650 feet (200 m) above sea level.

== Scorecards ==
Meadow Valleys Course at Blackwolf Run
Tee	Rating/Slope	1	2	3	4	5	6	7	8	9	Out	10	11	12	13	14	15	16	17	18	In	Total
Black	75.1 / 145	392	446	182	565	403	475	520	240	485	3708	382	522	461	341	423	227	590	182	478	3606	7314
Blue	73.2 / 139	368	402	176	539	380	470	494	187	462	3478	366	514	438	335	409	196	544	165	439	3406	6884
Green	71.5 / 136	349	385	158	516	362	444	488	176	432	3310	330	495	407	313	384	189	487	152	383	3140	6450
White	70.3 / 132	335	375	142	473	340	406	475	160	413	3119	320	487	395	304	376	150	478	138	373	3021	6140
White/Red	68.3 / 127	335	278	142	428	340	406	475	112	307	2823	320	460	327	304	376	103	478	138	373	2879	5702
Red	65.2 / 123	281	278	110	428	314	341	426	112	307	2597	242	460	327	233	293	103	415	92	303	2468	5065
SI		7	5	15	9	11	1	17	13	3		10	14	2	8	6	16	12	18	4
Par		4	4	3	5	4	4	5	3	4	36	4	5	4	4	4	3	5	3	4	36	72

River Course at Blackwolf Run
Tee	Rating/Slope	1	2	3	4	5	6	7	8	9	Out	10	11	12	13	14	15	16	17	18	In	Total
Black	76.2 / 151	610	377	468	219	427	388	426	532	361	3808	227	621	486	231	346	374	620	181	510	3596	7404
Blue	73.7 / 144	564	370	410	195	400	361	401	524	337	3562	204	560	465	205	310	354	560	175	470	3303	6865
Green	72.1 / 139	526	355	395	185	388	333	374	492	316	3364	194	536	423	150	304	346	540	168	440	3101	6465
White	70.3 / 132	501	345	389	146	376	308	352	470	302	3189	175	522	372	135	294	329	511	153	415	2906	6095
White/Red	68.0 / 127	501	310	295	146	275	308	352	470	302	2959	147	446	372	101	294	290	511	131	351	2643	5602
Red	65.7 / 123	411	310	295	117	275	265	298	401	238	2610	147	446	333	101	228	290	483	131	351	2510	5120
SI		5	13	1	15	3	17	7	9	11		14	6	2	10	16	18	8	12	4
Par		5	4	4	3	4	4	4	5	4	37	3	5	4	3	4	4	5	3	4	35	72
