= Matt Jones (golfer) =

Australian professional golfer (born 1980)

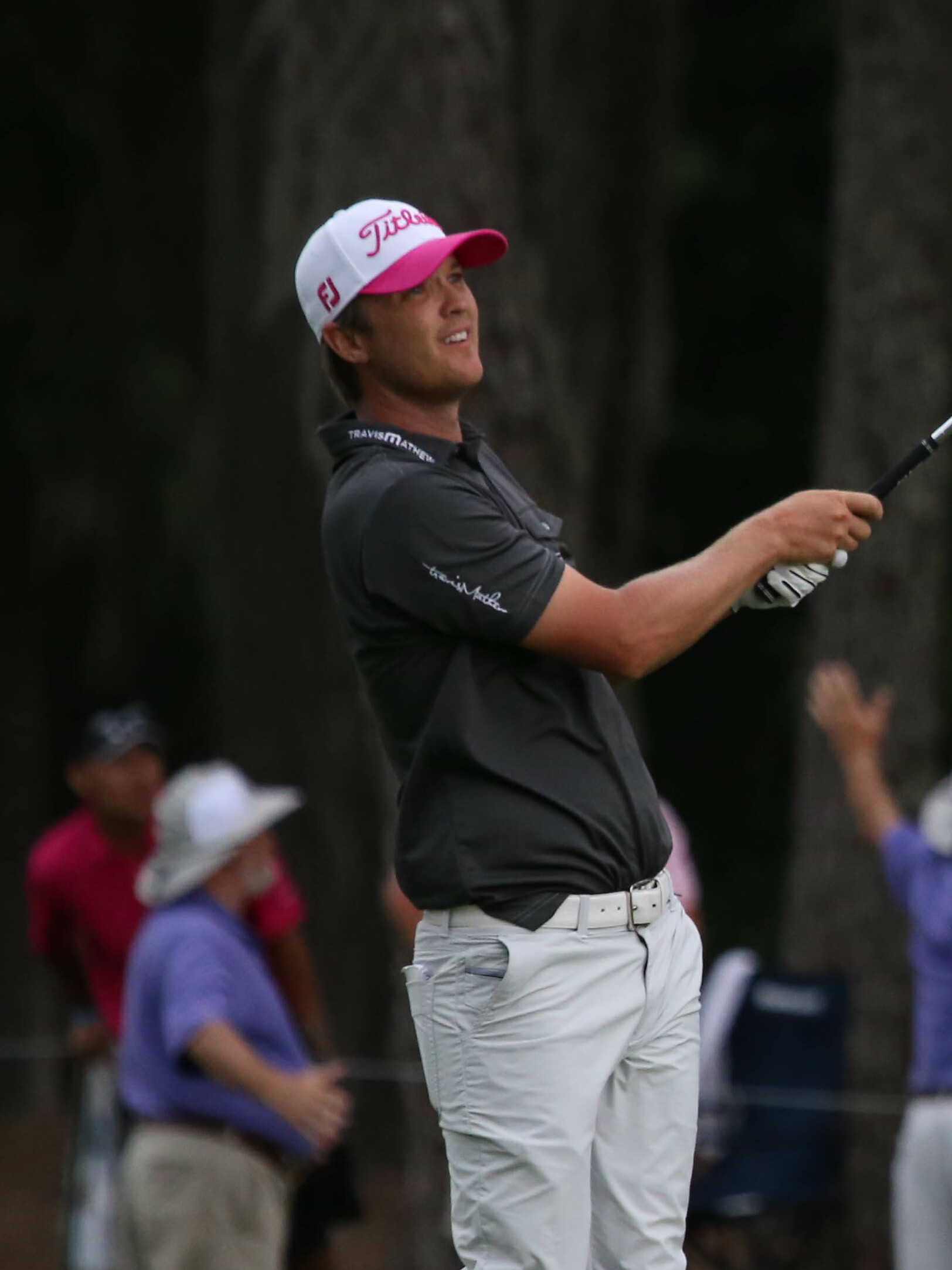
- Jones at the 2014 Players Championship

Personal information
- Full name: Matthew Paul Jones
- Nationality: Australia
- Born: 19 April 1980 (age 46) Sydney, Australia
- Height: 6 ft 0 in (1.83 m)
- Weight: 170 lb (77 kg; 12 st)
- Spouse: Melissa Weber (m. 2010)
- Children: 3

Career
- Sport: Golf
- College: Arizona State University
- Turned professional: 2001
- Current tours: Asian Tour; PGA Tour of Australasia
- Former tours: PGA Tour; Nationwide Tour; LIV Golf
- Professional wins: 4
- Highest ranking: 41 (6 April 2014)

Number of wins by tour
- PGA Tour: 2
- PGA Tour of Australasia: 2

Best results in major championships
- Masters Tournament: T26: 2021
- PGA Championship: T21: 2015
- U.S. Open: T65: 2021
- The Open Championship: T30: 2015

Matthew Paul Jones (born 19 April 1980) is an Australian professional golfer who plays on LIV Golf. Previously he played on the PGA Tour where he won twice, in the 2014 Shell Houston Open and The Honda Classic in 2021. Jones has also won the Emirates Australian Open twice, in 2015 and 2019.

== Early life and amateur career ==
In 1980, Jones was born in Sydney, Australia. He later moved to the United States to attend Arizona State University where he was a first-team All-American.

== Professional career ==
In 2001, Jones turned professional. In 2004, he joined the Nationwide Tour but did not have a break-out year until 2007. After having only a combined 8 top-10 finishes in his first three seasons between 2004 and 2006, he almost matched that in one season. He had 6 top-10s in 2007, finishing second four times and losing in two playoffs. He finished 7th on the money list and qualified to play his rookie season on the PGA Tour in 2008.

In his rookie season on the PGA Tour in 2008, Jones found limited success. His best finish of the season was a tie for 4th at the Honda Classic and the Buick Open. He finished the season with $775,899, but did not finish inside the top 125 on the money list, leaving him with conditional status for the 2009 season. In 2009 Jones had two top-10s, both 5th-place finishes at the Buick Invitational and at the John Deere Classic. At the six-round PGA Tour Qualifying Tournament in December 2009, where the top 25 finishers obtained their 2010 PGA Tour cards, Jones finished 3rd.

He finished fifth at the 2010 John Deere Classic and seventh at the Quail Hollow Championship. Also, he finished second at the Australian Open. His best result in 2011 was sixth at the Zurich Classic of New Orleans.

Jones improved in the 2013 PGA Tour season. He resulted second at the Greenbrier Classic, fifth at the Wyndham Championship, sixth at the Memorial Tournament, seventh at the John Deere Classic and eighth at the BMW Championship. Later he finished sixth at the Australian Open.

In his 156th PGA Tour start, Jones got his first PGA Tour win at the 2014 Shell Houston Open, beating Matt Kuchar on the first playoff hole when he made a 42-yard chip in for a birdie. He had previously made a 46-foot putt on the 18th hole to take the match to a playoff. The win also made Jones the last guaranteed entrant to the Masters and moved him to 41st in the Official World Golf Ranking. In May he finished 17th at The Players Championship.

In the 2015 PGA season, Jones finished 11th at the Hyundai Tournament of Champions. At the 2015 PGA Championship, Jones led the tournament by two strokes over Jason Day at the 36-hole stage. He shot rounds of 68–65 over the first two days for a total of 11-under-par. He started the third round strongly and extended his lead to three strokes midway through the round, but ended the round poorly, dropping four strokes in his last four holes to finish five behind the 54-hole leader, Jason Day. He would end the tournament T-21.

On 29 November 2015, Jones won his first title on his home PGA Tour of Australasia, with a victory in the Emirates Australian Open, one of the three Australian majors. He held off challenges by the world number one Jordan Spieth and Adam Scott to prevail by one stroke. Jones had led by three going into the final round, but dropped three shots in his opening two holes and also carded a triple bogey on the ninth hole. But he recovered by shooting two under on the back nine for a 73 to claim victory by one stroke. The win qualified Jones for the 2016 Open Championship.

On 8 December 2019, Jones won the Emirates Australian Open for the second time. With this win, he became one of 14 players, including Gary Player, Jack Nicklaus, Greg Norman, Peter Thomson and Jordan Spieth, who have won the Australian Open at least twice since World War II.

In March 2021, Jones won The Honda Classic by five strokes, for his first PGA Tour victory since 2014.

In January 2022, Jones finished 3rd at the Sentry Tournament of Champions at 32-under-par. He shot 62, 61 in the third and final round, a combined 23-under-par on the weekend.

In June 2022, Jones signed with LIV Golf.

== Personal life ==
Jones is married to Melissa Weber, who represented Idaho in Miss USA 2009 and has three daughters.

His brother Brett Jones was formerly the head club professional of Due Process Stable Golf Club in Colts Neck, New Jersey. Recently he has returned to Sydney, Australia though. Brett played in the 2015 PGA Championship.

== Professional wins (4) ==
=== PGA Tour wins (2) ===
No.	Date	Tournament	Winning score	To par	Margin of victory	Runner-up
1	6 Apr 2014	Shell Houston Open	68-68-71-66=273	−15	Playoff	(United States) Matt Kuchar
2	21 Mar 2021	The Honda Classic	61-70-69-68=268	−12	5 strokes	(United States) Brandon Hagy

PGA Tour playoff record (1–0)

No.	Year	Tournament	Opponent	Result
1	2014	Shell Houston Open	(United States) Matt Kuchar	Won with birdie on first extra hole

=== PGA Tour of Australasia wins (2) ===
Legend
Flagship events (2)
Other PGA Tour of Australasia (0)

No.	Date	Tournament	Winning score	To par	Margin of victory	Runner(s)-up
1	29 Nov 2015	Emirates Australian Open^{1}	67-68-68-73=276	−8	1 stroke	(Australia) Adam Scott, (United States) Jordan Spieth
2	8 Dec 2019	Emirates Australian Open (2)	67-65-68-69=269	−15	1 stroke	(South Africa) Louis Oosthuizen

^{1}Co-sanctioned by the OneAsia Tour

== Playoff record ==
Asian Tour playoff record (0–1)

No.	Year	Tournament	Opponent	Result
1	2023	St Andrews Bay Championship	(Spain) Eugenio Chacarra	Lost to par on tenth extra hole

Nationwide Tour playoff record (0–2)

No.	Year	Tournament	Opponents	Result
1	2007	Oregon Classic	(United States) Kyle Thompson, (United States) Jon Turcott	Thompson won with birdie on second extra hole
2	2007	Mark Christopher Charity Classic	(United States) Jeremy Anderson, (Wales) Richard Johnson	Johnson won with birdie on first extra hole

== Results in major championships ==
Results not in chronological order in 2020.

Tournament	2009	2010	2011	2012	2013	2014	2015	2016	2017	2018
Masters Tournament						CUT				
U.S. Open	WD					CUT				CUT
The Open Championship						T54	T30	T39		CUT
PGA Championship		CUT			T40	T46	T21	T79		

Tournament	2019	2020	2021	2022
Masters Tournament			T26	
PGA Championship		CUT	T30	CUT
U.S. Open	CUT	CUT	T65	
The Open Championship		NT	CUT	

Did not play

CUT = missed the half-way cut
WD = withdrew
"T" = tied
NT = No tournament due to COVID-19 pandemic

=== Summary ===
Tournament	Wins	2nd	3rd	Top-5	Top-10	Top-25	Events	Cuts made
Masters Tournament	0	0	0	0	0	0	2	1
PGA Championship	0	0	0	0	0	1	8	5
U.S. Open	0	0	0	0	0	0	6	1
The Open Championship	0	0	0	0	0	0	5	3
Totals	0	0	0	0	0	1	21	10

- Most consecutive cuts made – 6 (2014 Open – 2016 PGA)
- Longest streak of top-10s – 0

== Results in The Players Championship ==
Tournament	2008	2009
The Players Championship	CUT	

Tournament	2010	2011	2012	2013	2014	2015	2016	2017	2018	2019
The Players Championship		T19		CUT	T17	CUT	CUT			

Tournament	2020	2021	2022
The Players Championship	C	T55	CUT

Did not play

CUT = missed the halfway cut
"T" indicates a tie for a place
C = Cancelled after the first round due to the COVID-19 pandemic

== Results in World Golf Championships ==
Results not in chronological order before 2015.

Tournament	2014	2015	2016	2017	2018	2019	2020	2021
Championship								
Match Play		T34	T51				NT^{1}	
Invitational	T31		T16				T59	T51
Champions	T53	T40					NT^{1}	NT^{1}

^{1}Cancelled due to COVID-19 pandemic

Did not play

QF, R16, R32, R64 = Round in which player lost in match play
NT = No tournament
"T" = Tied

== See also ==
- 2007 Nationwide Tour graduates
- 2009 PGA Tour Qualifying School graduates
- 2012 PGA Tour Qualifying School graduates
- 2017 Web.com Tour Finals graduates
- 2018 Web.com Tour Finals graduates
