= Austin Peters =

American writer/director

- Born: July 30; Los Angeles, California
- Education: New York University
- Occupation: Filmmaker
- Years active: 2013–present

Austin Peters is an American director and writer best known for his debut black comedy crime film, Skincare (2024), which he co-wrote and directed.

== Career ==
Austin Peters' work is characterized by a keen attention to aesthetics, an understanding of character, and an awareness of the environments he portrays.

=== Film ===
==== Skincare (2024) ====
Starring Elizabeth Banks as Hope Goldman, Skincare follows an aesthetician to the stars as she is about to launch her own skincare line. Convinced someone is trying to sabotage her once her professional rival opens a boutique across the street, the film follows Hope as she attempts to unravel the mystery of who is out to get her. The film is loosely based on the true story of Dawn LaLuise, a Los Angeles aesthetician accused of attempted murder-for-hire of a professional rival. Peters' aesthetic palette of pastels is inspired by the color saturation of American photographer Philip-Lorca diCorcia. To maintain the authenticity of the setting, Peters shot the film on location in Los Angeles. Set in the recent past of 2014, Skincare confronts topical concerns, such as digital alienation, cancel culture, the American Dream and late capitalism.

==== Give Me Future (2017) ====
Give Me Future is a concert documentary of a Major Lazer performance in Havana, Cuba. Shortly after then President Barack Obama eased the United States trade embargo against Cuba, Major Lazer traveled to Havana for an unprecedented outdoor concert, attracting nearly 500,000 people. Give Me Future documents the set up and execution of that concert, while simultaneously exploring Cuban youth culture, the underground information system of el paquete semenal, and the current state of music. Peters directed the film, which Premiered at the 2017 Sundance Film Festival and was acquired by Apple Music.

==== NYC, 1981 (2015) ====
Commissioned by the film's distributor A24, Peters directed this six-minute documentary as a companion piece to the J. C. Chandor film, A Most Violent Year (2014). The short film examines how dangerous and violent the year 1981 was for New Yorkers, through testimonies from Guardian Angels' founder Curtis Sliwa, performance artist Penny Arcade, actress Johnnie Mae, and Harlem fashion icon Dapper Dan.

=== Music videos ===
Peters has directed music videos for artists including Haim, Charli XCX, Bastille, and Orville Peck.

In 2015, Peters directed the music video for Chvrches' song "Empty Threat", which was listed as one of the ten best music videos of 2015 by Rolling Stone.

In 2018, Peters directed the music video "Moonlight" for Lil Xan and Charli XCX and, the following year, he directed a musical short film for Country musician, Orville Peck's song "Queen of the Rodeo." Peters has directed several other music videos for Peck, including all of the videos from his album "Bronco".

Peters has also directed campaigns for commercial brands. In 2019, he directed a campaign for Nike starring LeBron James, and in 2021, directed a campaign for Rag & Bone called "Times Change," starring choreographer Lil Buck and his wife Ali Shimatsu.
