= John Michael Kohler House =

Historic house in Wisconsin, United States

- U.S. National Register of Historic Places
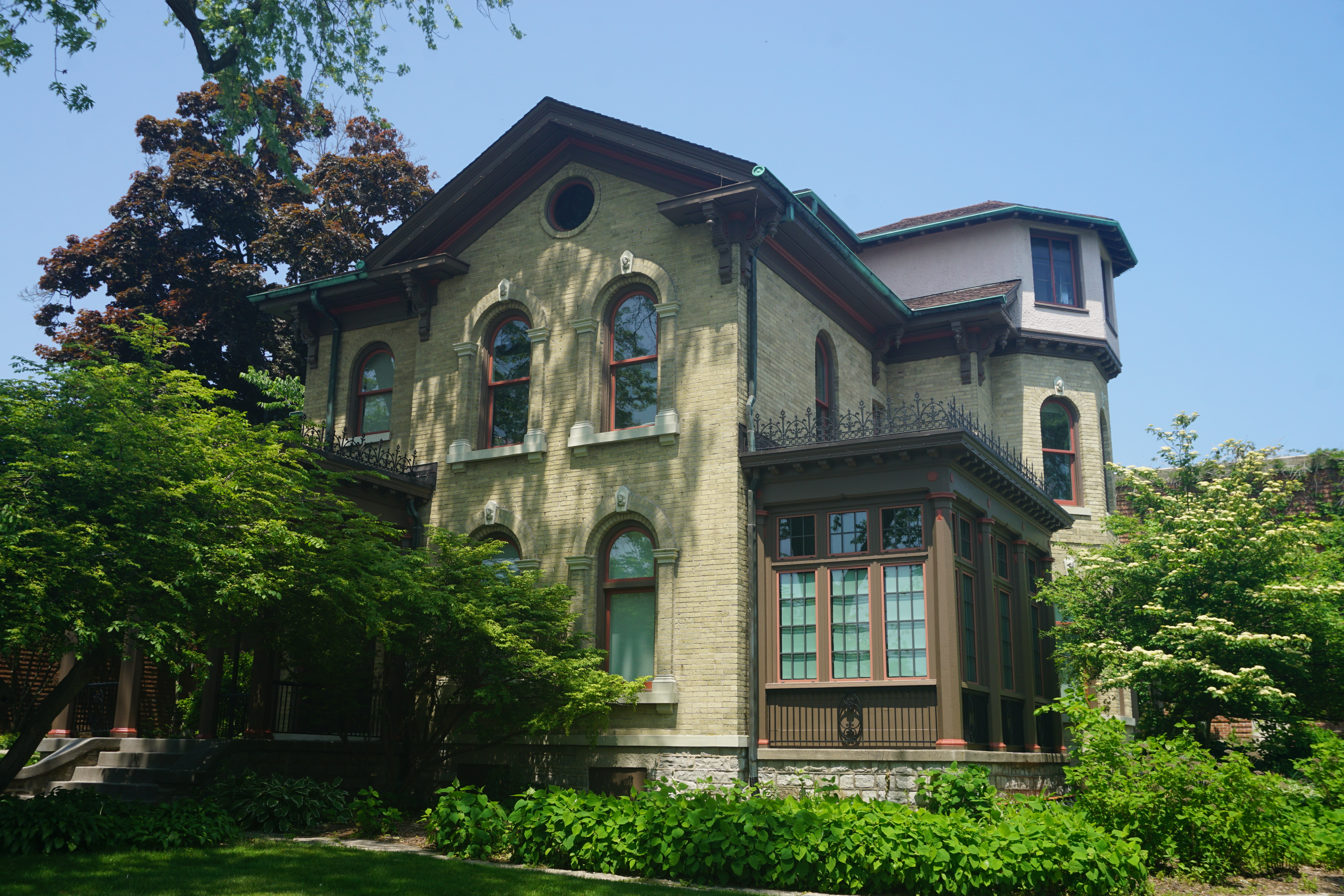
- John Michael Kohler House

- Location within Wisconsin Location within the United States
- Location: 602 New York Avenue; Sheboygan, Wisconsin
- Coordinates: 43°45′8″N 87°42′36″W
- Built: 1882
- Architect: Richard Philipp (1920 remodel)
- Architectural style: Italianate
- Website: www.jmkac.org
- NRHP reference No.: 82001850
- Added to NRHP: November 30, 1982

The John Michael Kohler House is an historic house listed on the National Register of Historic Places in Sheboygan, Wisconsin, United States. The house is currently a part of the John Michael Kohler Arts Center complex.

== History ==
The house was constructed in 1882 by John Michael Kohler (1844–1900), a past mayor of Sheboygan and founder of the Kohler Company. No documentary record of the house's architect has been found. Family tradition recalls that John Michael Kohler, himself, designed the house. This is plausible, because it is known that other members of the Kohler family in Austria engaged in architecture, including John Michael's father, whose design of a small church survives.

An extensive addition and remodel was completed in 1920. At the time the house was occupied by his second wife, Wilhemina Minnie Vollrath (1842-1929) and four of his children Evangeline (1872-1954), Marie (1876-1943), Lillie (1877-1965), and Herbert Sr (1891-1968).

Ownership of the house was transferred to the Kohler Foundation in the will of Evangeline Kohler in 1954 with a life estate for her sister Lillie.

The Sheboygan Arts Foundation, Inc. was created in 1959 and its first board included Mrs. Walter J. Kohler III.

In 1966, after the death of Lillie Kohler in 1965, the Kohler Foundation gifted the house to the Sheboygan Arts Foundation, Inc. for the use of the arts center.

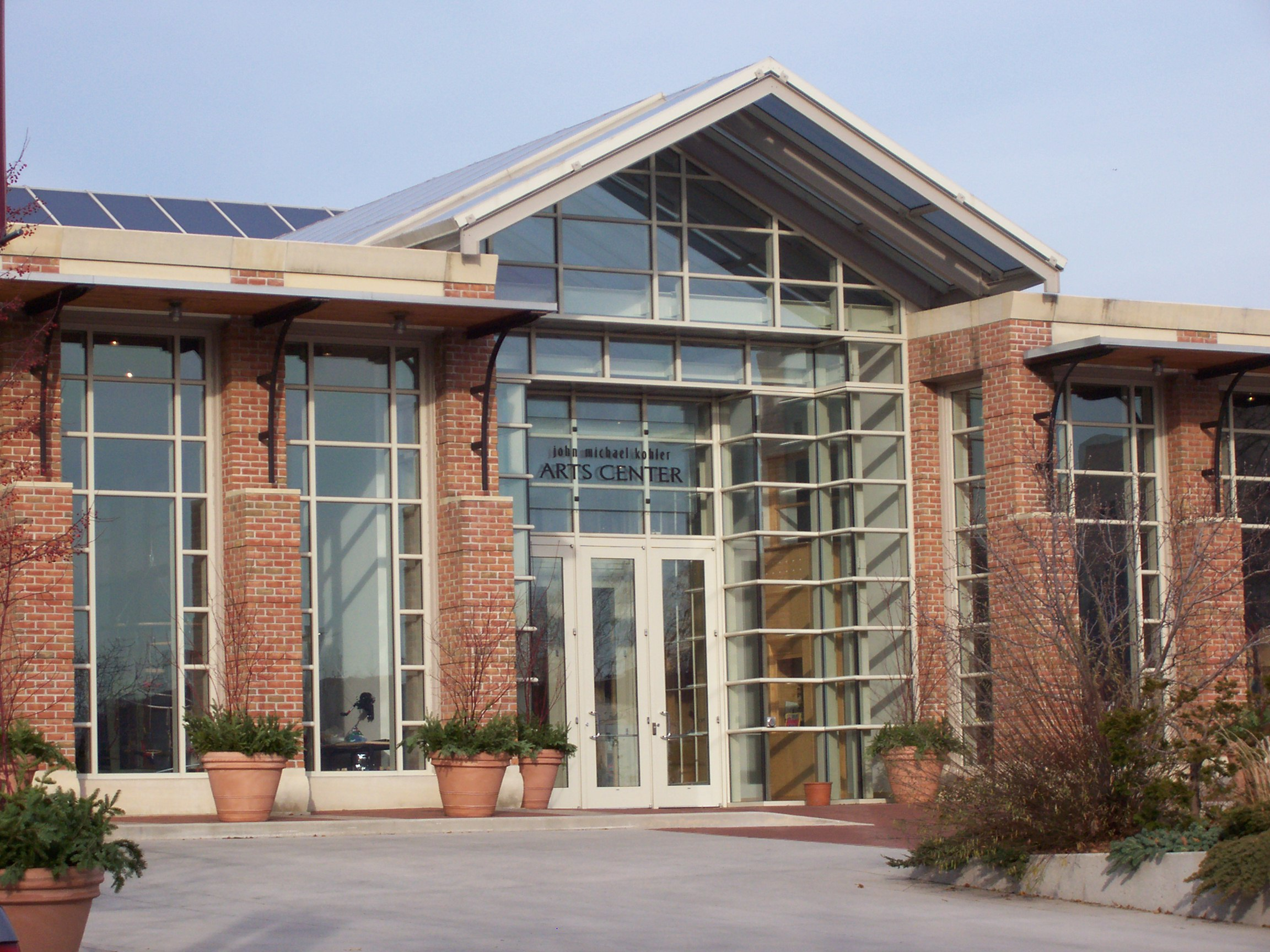
John Michael Kohler Arts Center

== Architecture ==
Note:The following text is primarily sourced from the NRHP application for the house.

The house is a two-story brick veneered structure on a coursed limestone foundation capped with an iron water table. Plan and massing are asymmetrical, with pavilions projected on all facades. The east-facing pavilion contains a two-story bay. The roofline is gently pitched and had projecting gables with heavy eaves and cornices and with returns suggestive of a classical pediment. The eaves have carved and scroll cut brackets with turned pendants. The main facade gable is pierced with a bull's-eye window. Windows have round arches with distinctive cast iron keystones that may have been made in the Kohler foundry. The arches are supported on pilasters with decorative iron capitals and bases footed on iron sills.

A projecting single story porch facing both the front walk and the driveway to the left dominates the southwest corner of the house and shelters the main entrance. Single story porches are also found on the southeast and northeast corners of the house, although the southeast porch was enclosed in the 1920s remodeling. At this time Victorian porch columns and gingerbread were replaced with heavier hexagonal columns and cornice, but original cast iron cresting still crowns each porch.

The original main floor plan formed an asymmetrical cross with parlors dominating the front and center portions and dining room, study, and kitchens occupying the rear and west pavilions. The parlors were separated by massive sliding doors. Most essential features of the plan, as well as the sliding doors, decorative cove moulding in the parlors, and the staircase were retained in the 1920s remodeling. The iron gazebo and the fountain, which features a cast zinc sculpture depicting three children with a dolphin are original to the house, although they were relocated during the remodeling. The gazebo and the fountain sculpture may have been made at the Kohler foundry.

The 1920s remodeling did not greatly alter the exterior appearance of the house. The southeast porch was enclosed with windows and panels to provide a sunroom adjacent to the front parlor. The east bay was raised a third story to create a penthouse bedroom, and the rear-facing pavilion was extended in a two-story bay, These additions were finished with stucco in a muted Mediterranean Revival fashion and in sympathy with the original architecture of the house. The fenestration of the west-facing pavilion and back part of the west facade was altered to accommodate remodeling of the dining room and to increase the lighting of the master bedroom above it.

On the interior, the remodeling was more thoroughgoing and utilized accepted Italian motifs of the Eclectic Resurgence. The interior has been little altered in the building's reuse. Victorian wall finishes were replaced with textured plaster painted in cream tones. The dining room was relocated to the west facing pavilion and decorated with oak paneling, ceiling beams, built-in cabinets and sideboards, and a massive table and chairs. Casement windows and cabinet doors are of decorative stained and leaded glass designed by Kaspar Albrecht. Flooring is of decorative Moravian tile from Henry Mercer's Pennsylvania factory. The room and its furnishings are preserved as the formal meeting room of the arts center. Moravian tile and Albrecht glass were'also employed in the new north facing bay, which became a part of the relocated study. The bay also features a characteristic vaulted ceiling and a carved stone fireplace. Moravian tile was also used in the upstairs hall, the master bedroom, and the redecorated main fireplace. The master bedroom has casement windows of Albrecht glass.
