= Marilyn Lysohir =

American ceramist

Marilyn Lysohir (born 1950) is an American ceramist.

Lysohir is a native of Sharon, Pennsylvania. Her mother served in the United States Marine Corps and her father in the U.S. Army during World War 2. Beginning in high school, she worked for a chocolate factory, eventually creating sculptures out of chocolate. In 1972 she earned her bachelor's degree from Ohio Northern University, following with a Master of Fine Arts degree from Washington State University in 1979. She lives in Moscow, Idaho, where she was founder and owner of the company Cowgirl Chocolates; she also spent time as an adjunct instructor at the Washington State University and The University of Idaho, and has been an artist-in-residence or visiting artist at the Kohler Foundation, the Kansas City Art Institute, and The New York State College at Alfred, and Ohio State University. Much of her work takes as its subject elements of her own family history. Lysohir, who is married to Ross Coates, is of Ukrainian descent. She and her husband are the founding editors of annual arts journal High Ground. She is best known for her large-scale ceramics; examples include The Dark Side of Dazzle, a two-ton installation of a battleship and bathroom, and Good Girls, 164 portrait busts of all the girls she graduated with in 1968 from Sharon High School in Sharon, Pennsylvania.
