= Kohler Distinguished Guest Series =

Distinguished Guest Series

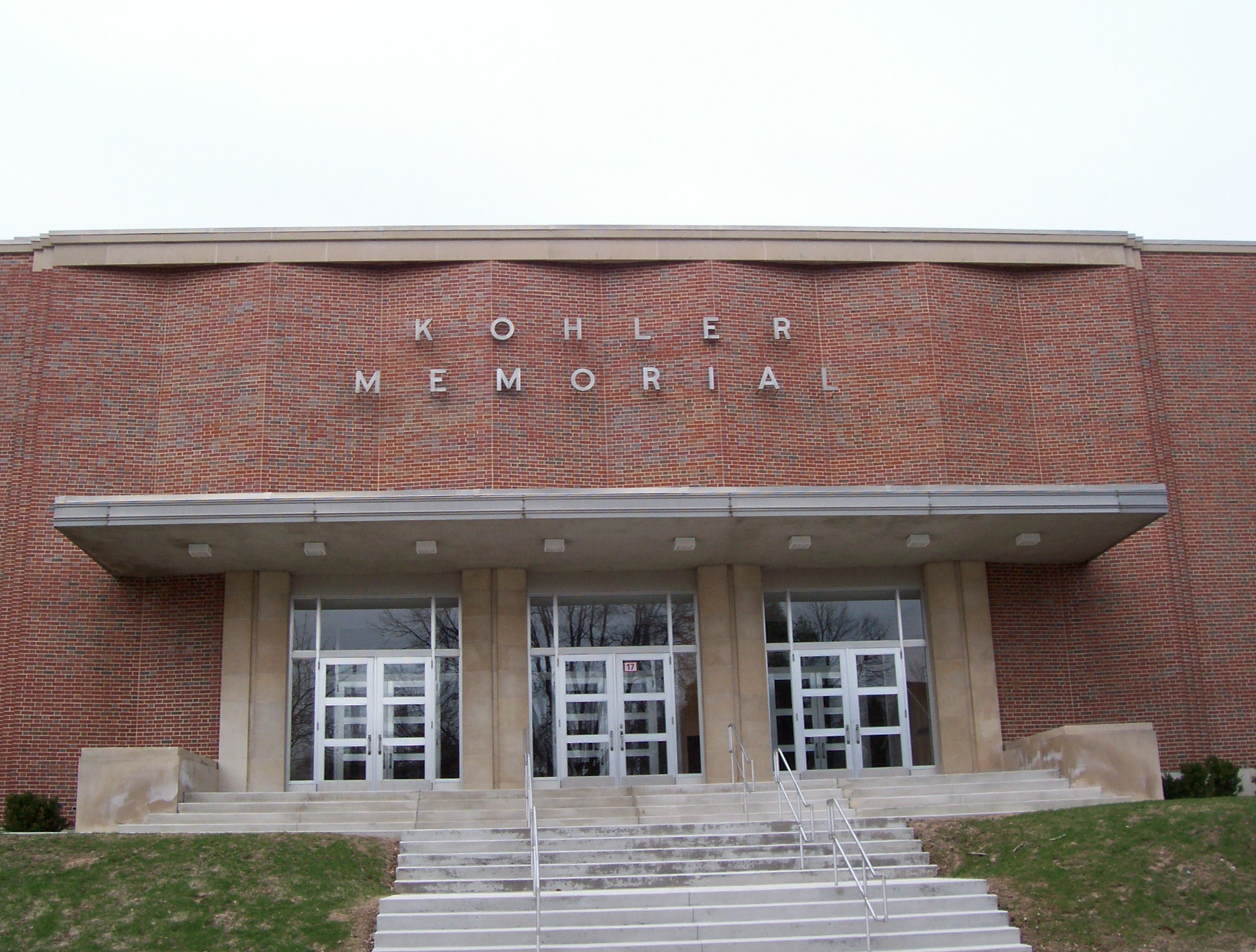
- Home of the Kohler Memorial Theatre
- Interactive map of Distinguished Guest Series
- Address: Kohler Memorial Theatre; Kohler, Wisconsin; United States
- Coordinates: 43°44′21″N 87°47′05″W

Construction
- Opened: 1944
- Years active: 70

Website
- www.kohlerfoundation.org/distinguished-guest-series/

Kohler Distinguished Guest Series is a series of lecture and performing arts programs began in 1944 with a current venue at the Kohler Memorial Theatre in Kohler, Wisconsin.

== History ==
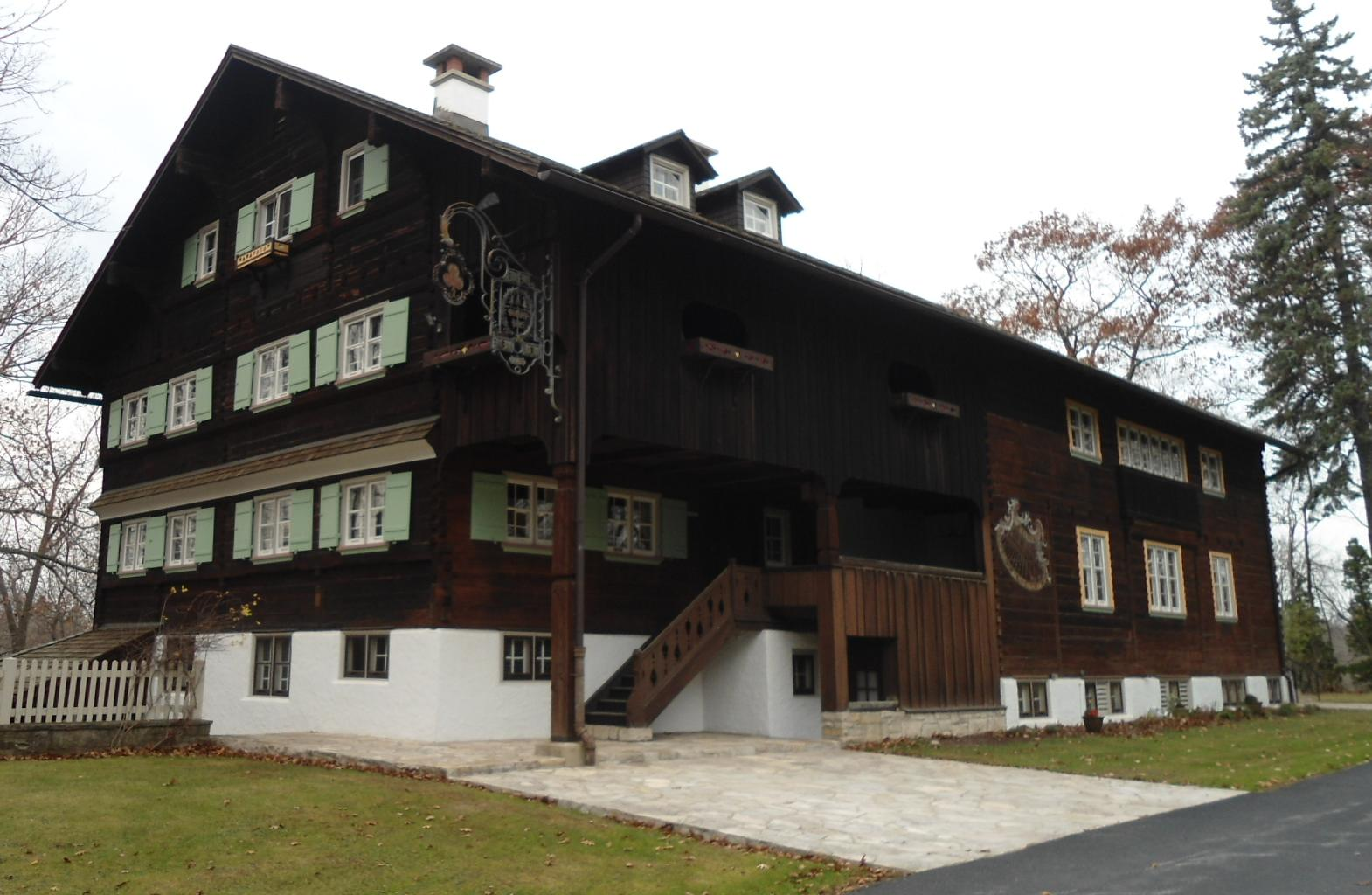
Waelderhaus

The Kohler Women's Club formally established the Distinguished Guest Series in 1944. The series arranged for guest lectures and art performances on a semi-regular basis during a season than ran from fall to spring the next year. "Through this series it is the club's purpose to bring to the membership impartial discussion of important events of the day by outstanding authorities. Programs of a purely artistic nature are for cultural uplift". In the early years, the events were primarily arranged by Ruth DeYoung-Kohler.

The Kohler family had previously on occasion sponsored guest speakers and performers. In 1925, the John Philip Sousa band performed in Kohler for a crowd estimated at 30000. On November 29, 1930, Admiral Richard Byrd appeared before an audience of about 2000 at the Kohler Recreation Hall to talk about his flight over the south pole a year earlier. Admiral Byrd returned in 1947 and appeared as a formal guest during the fourth season of the series.

In the early years, most of the events were limited to members of the Women's Club and were held in the Waelderhaus in Kohler, Wisconsin. Growing popularity of some of the musical events that were opened to the public necessitated that they be held at the Kohler Recreation Hall. In 1952, attendance for the Leslie Bell Singers totaled over 1500.

In May 1953, the Kohler Foundation announced that it would join the Kohler Women's Club as a co-sponsor of the series. This change followed the death of Ruth DeYoung-Kohler in March, 1953. The events were primarily open to the public and in season 11, all but two of the events were held in the Kohler Recreation Hall. The recreation hall opened in 1927 and was located in the Kohler store building, at the corner of Orchard and Highland St, in Kohler. Most events were held in the Kohler Memorial center, at the Kohler High School, after it was completed in 1957.

Beginning with the 1970–1971 season, the afternoon lectures and the evening arts performances were separated with the Kohler Women's Club continuing the lecture series and the Kohler Foundation continuing the arts programs under the Distinguished Guest Series title.

The arts series has continued and as of the 2018–2019 season was in its 75th year.

== List of notable guests ==
This is a selected list of guests who have appeared in the series. The selection criteria are based on documented appearances and the existence of Wikipedia articles. Announced schedules are not considered authoritative due to some speakers and events being rescheduled or cancelled.

=== 1940s ===
Season	Years	Notable guest – Appearance date
1	1944–1945	Lena Madesin Phillips – Oct 16, 1944; Channing Pollock – November 1, 1944; Osa Johnson – Dec 6, 1944
2	1945–1946	Margaret Culkin Banning – October 1, 1945; Trapp Family Singers – Feb 26, 1946; Nora Waln – April 3, 1946; George Papashvily – April 17, 1946
3	1946–1947	Franklin Pierce Adams – Nov 5, 1946; Erika Mann – Nov 5, 1946
4	1947–1948	Admiral Richard Byrd – Oct 22, 1947; Susan Reed – Nov 19, 1947; Dorothy Thompson – Dec 3, 1947; Kurt Schuschnigg – Jan 7, 1947; Vivien Kellems – Jan 28, 1948; De Paur's Infantry Chorus- Feb 15, 1947; John Ott – March 17, 1948; Jesse Stuart – April 14, 1948
5	1948–1949	Anna Russell – Oct 6, 1948; Raymond Moley – Oct 20, 1948; John Erskine – Nov 8, 1948; Norman Vincent Peale – Jan 19, 1949; Otto von Habsburg – Feb 16, 1949; Ruth Bryan Owen – March 9, 1949; Joe E. Brown – April 24, 1949
6	1949–1950	Ilka Chase – Oct 19, 1949; Adolphe Menjou – Oct 25, 1949; William Bradford Huie – Nov 16, 1949; Burl Ives – Dec 6, 1949; Dorothy Liebes – Jan 18, 1950; Peter II of Yugoslavia – Jan 10, 1950; Alec Templeton – March 15, 1950

=== 1950s ===
Season	Years	Notable guest – Appearance date
7	1950–1951	Hildegarde – Oct 21, 1950; Mary Garden – Jan 24, 1951; Ernestine Gilbreth Carey – Feb 14, 1951; Clare Boothe Luce – Feb 26, 1951
8	1951–1952	Vera Maxwell – Oct 3, 1951; Carleton Smith – Oct 17, 1951; Camille Kelley – January 16, 1952; Hedda Hopper – April 2, 1952; Nelson Eddy – April 15, 1952; Princess Ileana of Romania – April 23, 1952
9	1952–1953	William F. Buckley, Jr. Oct 8, 1952; Leslie Bell Singers – Oct 22, 1952; Elsa Lanchester and Ray Henderson, – Nov 2, 1952; Rosita Forbes – Nov 19, 1952; Richard Gump – Jan 21, 1953; Harry Emerson Fosdick – Feb 4, 1953; Margaret Bourke-White – Feb 18, 1953; Oscar Levant – March 5, 1953; Bertita Harding – April 15, 1953; Gershwin Concert Orchestra with Lorin Maazel, Jesús Maria Sanromá, Carolyn Long, and Theodor Uppman – May 10, 1953
10 (Note: The news story announcing the lineup for 1953–54 refers to previous nine seasons being organized by Ruth DeYoung-Kohler.)	1953–1954	Lloyd Wendt – Oct 28, 1953; Guard Republican Band of Paris Nov 21, 1953; William Warfield March 7, 1954
11	1954–1955	Robert Shaw Chorale – Oct 3, 1954; Obernkirchen Children's Choir – Oct 17, 1954; Salzburg Marionettes – Nov 3, 1954; Harlan Tarbell – Jan 22, 1955; Fulton Lewis – Feb 12, 1955; Dorothy Maynor – Mar 1, 1955; K. C. Wu – March 16, 1955
12 (Note: There are some inconsistencies in the season numbering. The news story announcing the lineup for 1955–56 refers to this as the 13th season.)	1955–1956	Marie Powers – Oct 22, 1955; William Montgomery McGovern – Nov 16, 1955; Nikolai Khokhlov – Dec 7, 1955; Jean Ritchie – Feb 1, 1956; Jascha Heifetz – March 4, 1956; John D. Craig – March 21, 1956; Eileen Farrell – April 13, 1956
13	1956–1957	Camilla Williams with Todd Duncan – Jan 12, 1957; Hazel Scott – Feb 12, 1957; Winged Victory – March 9, 1957
14	1957–1958	Mark W. Clark – Nov 30, 1957; Josef Traxel – Jan 12, 1958; Norman Garbo – Jan 22, 1958; Hilde Gueden – Feb 16, 1958; Purdue Varsity Glee Club – March 22, 1958
15 (Note: The news story announcing the lineup for 1958–59 refers to this as the 15th year.)	1958–1959	Joyce Brothers – Nov 19, 1958; Cesare Siepi – Nov 29, 1958; Mary Martin – Jan 12, 1959; Erroll Garner – Feb 18, 1959; Jarmila Novotná – March 18, 1959; Willy Ley – April 13, 1959
16	1959–1960	Duke of Bedford – Oct 28, 1959; Irmgard Seefried – Nov 21, 1959; Barry Langford – Jan 27, 1960; Marian Anderson – March 5, 1960; Boston Opera Group – March 16, 1960; Munro Leaf – April 20, 1960

=== 1960s ===
Season	Years	Notable guest – Appearance date
17	1960–1961	Don Freeman – Oct 19, 1960; J.B. feat. Shepperd Strudwick and Mary Curtis Verna – Nov 19, 1960; Fiore de Henriquez – April 5, 1961; Risë Stevens – April 27, 1961
18	1961–1962	Marie Torre – Oct 4, 1961; Bayanihan Philippine Dance Company – Nov 3, 1960; Suzanne Johnson – Nov 15, 1961; Bach Aria Group – Feb 1, 1962; Mary Costa – Feb 28, 1962; Moura Lympany – April 14, 1962
19	1962–1963	Jerome Hines – Jan 22,1963; Willard L. Beaulac – Feb 6, 1963; Lehman Engel – Feb 20, 1963; Carroll Glenn and Eugene List – March 10, 1963; Mary Costa – April 4, 1963
20	1963–1964	Anna Chennault – Jan 15, 1964; Joy Adamson – Jan 29, 1964; Edith Peinemann – Feb 11, 1964; Ralph Votapek – Feb 29, 1964; Jens Bjerre – March 11, 1964; Anna Moffo – March 25, 1964
21	1964–1965	John Frederick Coots – Oct 7, 1964; Beyond the Fringe with Peter Cook, Dudley Moore, Alan Bennett, and Jonathan Miller – Oct 21, 1964; Jim Fowler – Jan 13, 1965; Elinor Ross – Jan 20, 1965; Gina Bachauer – March 9, 1965; Thomas Franck – March 24, 1965
22	1965–1966	Betty Furness – Oct 6, 1965; Eve Merriam – Jan 12, 1966; Richard Ellsasser – Jan 27, 1966; Greta Keller – March 2, 1966; Earl Wrightson and Lois Hunt – March 31, 1966
23	1966–1967	Ferrante & Teicher – Oct 24, 1966; Harry Mark Petrakis – Nov 2, 1966; Robert Manry – Jan 11, 1967; Little Angels – Feb 1, 1967; Bergen Evans – Feb 8, 1967; The Romeros – March 7, 1967; Don Keefer – March 29, 1967; Monica Dickens – April 12, 1967
24	1967–1968	Princess Nadine Tereshchenko – Oct 18, 1967; Joyce Grenfell – Nov 6, 1967; McHenry Boatwright – Dec 5, 1967; Sir John Wedgwood – Jan 17, 1968; Royal Winnipeg Ballet – Jan 27, 1968; Robert Edwin Lee – March 13, 1968
25	1968–1969	National Theatre of the Deaf – Oct 23, 1968; John Spencer-Churchill – Nov 6, 1968; Jens Bjerre – Jan 27, 1969; Minneapolis Symphony, Stanisław Skrowaczewski cond. – Feb 15, 1969; William Walker – April 16, 1969
26	1969–1970	Rita Hauser – Oct 1, 1969; Vienna Boys' Choir – March 3, 1970; William G. Callow – April 22, 1970

=== 1970s ===
Season	Years	Notable guest – Appearance date
27	1970–1971	Pennsylvania Ballet – Oct 10, 1970; New York Pro Musica – Nov 4, 1970; Music From Marlboro – Jan 25, 1971; World's Greatest Jazz Band – April 1, 1971
28	1971–1972	Marcel Marceau – Oct 6, 1971; Alexis Weissenberg – Feb 3, 1972; National Players – March 11, 1972
29	1972–1973	Gregg Smith Singers – Oct 19, 1972; Emlyn Williams – Dec 1, 1972; Lar Lubovitch – Feb 14, 1973; Gary Graffman and Leonard Rose – April 10, 1973
30	1973–1974	Vienna Johann Strauss Orchestra – Oct 16, 1973; Cantigas de Santa Maria – Dec 2, 1973; Minnesota Orchestra – April 5, 1974
31	1974–1975	Shirley Verrett – Oct 14, 1974; Susan Starr – Feb 18, 1975
32	1975–1976	Mantererdi Choir of Hamburg feat. Ian Partridge, Nigel Rogers and Barbara Schlick – Oct 28, 1975; William Windom – Nov 20, 1975; Jelly Roll Morton tribute – Feb 28, 1976; Odetta – April 14, 1976
33	1976–1977	Matrix – Oct 28, 1976; Fires of London – Nov 18, 1976; Nicanor Zabaleta – Feb 8, 1977; Cincinnati Ballet – April 28, 1977
34	1977–1978	Georgian National Ballet Oct 18, 1977; Garrick Ohlsson Nov 22, 1977; Wagner Chorale Feb 6, 1978; Franz Liszt Chamber Orchestra April 9, 1978
35	1978–1979	Lionel Hampton Dec 4, 1978
36	1979–1980	New Christy Minstrels – Nov 5, 1979; Marian McPartland May, 1980

=== 1980s ===
Season	Years	Notable guest – Appearance date
37	1980–1981	The Swingle Singers – Nov, 1980; Kurt Weill – Feb, 1981
38	1981–1982	
39	1982–1983	
40	1983–1984	
41	1984–1985	
42	1985–1986	
43	1986–1987	Dale Warland Singers
44	1987–1988	
45	1988–1989	
46	1989–1990	

=== 1990s ===
Season	Years	Notable guest – Appearance date
47	1990–1991	
48	1991–1992	
49	1992–1993	
50	1993–1994	
51	1994–1995	Alvin Ailey – Sep 18, 1995; Bobby McFerrin with Saint Paul Chamber Orchestra – Jan 25, 1996
52	1995–1996	
53	1996–1997	
54	1997–1998	
55	1998–1999	
56	1999–2000	

=== 2000s ===
Season	Years	Notable guest – Appearance date
57	2000–2001	Three Dog Night Oct 21, 2001; Ailey II Feb, 2001; Sweet Honey in the Rock April, 2001
58	2001–2002	The Waverly Consort Nov, 2001; Boys Choir of Harlem Feb 23, 2002
59	2002–2003	London City Opera Feb, 2003
60	2003–2004	The Ten Tenors Oct, 2003; Forbidden Broadway Feb, 2004; The Roches April 3, 2004
61	2004–2005	Shanghai Circus – Jan, 2005; John Amos – April 9, 2005
62	2005–2006	Salzburg Marionettes – Dec 2, 2005; Hal Holbrook – March, 2006
63	2006–2007	The 5 Browns – Feb 6, 2007; Toxic Audio – April 14, 2007
64	2007–2008	MOMIX – Oct 7, 2007; Intergalactic Nemesis – March 1, 2008; Maya Angelou – April 26, 2008
65	2008–2009	Leahy – Oct 18, 2008; Moscow Ballet – Jan, 2009; The Ten Tenors – April 22, 2009
66	2009–2010	Virsky Ukrainian Dance Ensemble – Oct 29, 2009; Diane Schuur & Bobby Caldwell – Feb 12, 2010

=== 2010s ===
Season	Years	Notable guest – Appearance date
67	2010–2011	Ballet Hispanico – Feb 12, 2011; John Tesh – April 19, 2011
68	2011–2012	Cellicentric – Feb 18, 2012; Kenny Loggins – April 21, 2012
69	2012–2013	Straight No Chaser – Dec 6, 2012; Shanghai Circus – March 6, 2013; Michael McDonald – April 27, 2013
70	2013–2014	Air Supply – Nov 9, 2013; Five Guys Named Moe – Feb 14, 2014; Itzhak Perlman – April 5, 2014
71	2014–2015	Yo-Yo Ma and Kathryn Stott – Oct 19, 2014; Announced Schedule (subject to change): Audra McDonald – Feb 27, 2015; Straight No Chaser – April 10, 2015
72	2015–2016	
73	2016–2017	
74	2017–2018	
75	2018–2019	Katharine McPhee - November 13, 2018
76	2019–2020	

=== 2020s ===
Season	Years	Notable guest – Appearance date
	2020–2021	theatre under renovation
77	2021–2022	
78	2022–2023	
79	2023–2024	
