= Waelderhaus =

- Wälderhaus (German)
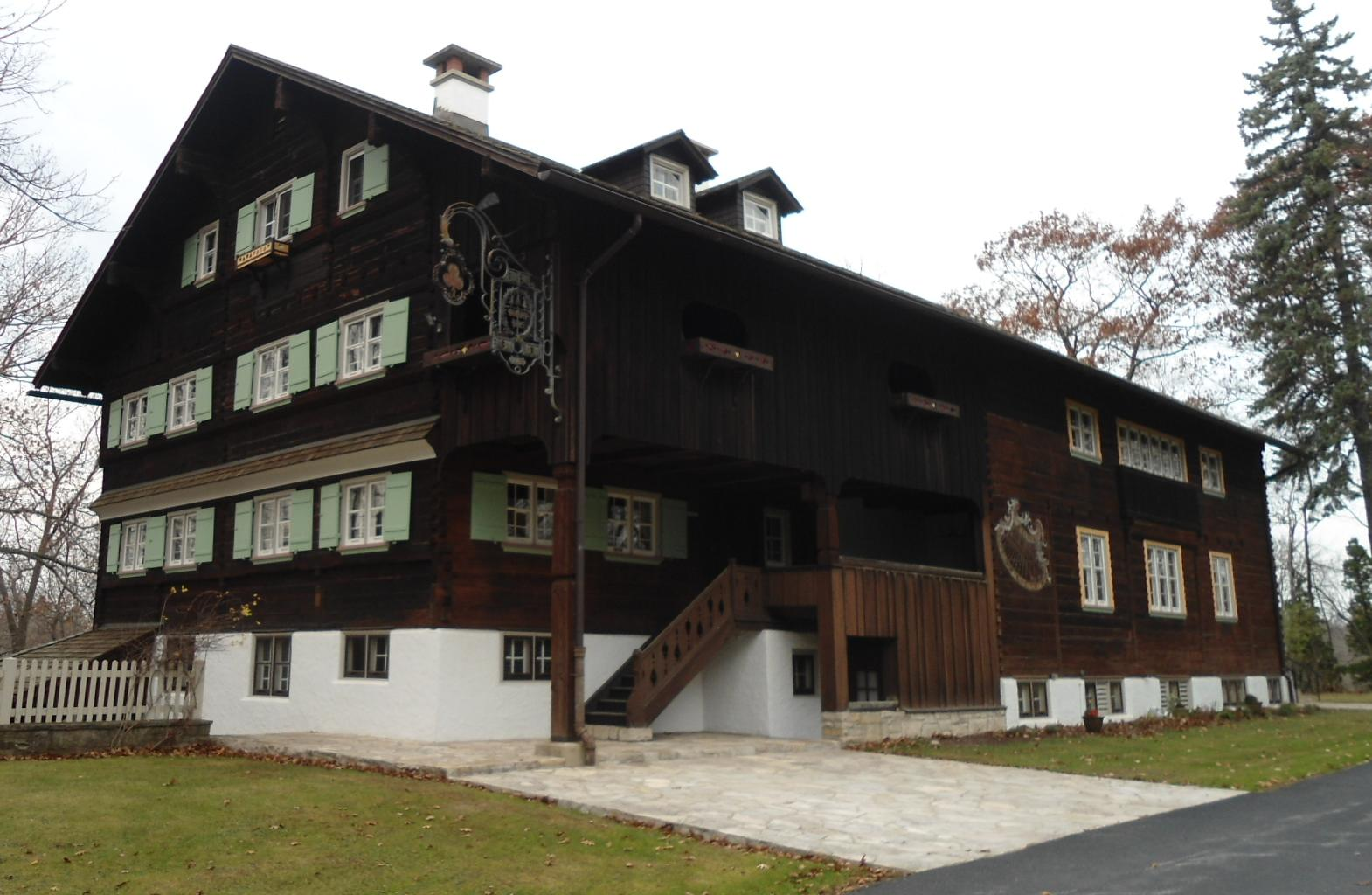

- Location within Wisconsin
- 43°43′58″N 87°46′49.5″W
- Location: 1100 W. Riverside Dr, Kohler, Wisconsin

History
- Built: 1929–1931

Site notes
- Architect: Kaspar Albrecht
- Architectural style: Bregenzerwald
- Owner: Kohler Foundation, Inc.

The Waelderhaus is a structure in Kohler, Wisconsin, managed by the Kohler Foundation. It was constructed by Marie C Kohler as a memorial to her father John Michael Kohler II (1844–1900). It was built as a headquarters for the Kohler Women's Club, the local chapter of Girl Scouts and as a public meeting place for lectures and small performances.

== Architecture ==
The building was designed and furnished by Austrian architect Kaspar Albrecht. It was designed in the traditional style of the Bregenzerwald (Bregenz Forest) region of western Austria. The veranda, living room and work room were done in the original style. The lower level was provided with modern facilities in the kitchen. The lower level also houses a dining room along with the dressing and make-up rooms to service the auditorium on the main level.

The second floor houses a traditional Bregenzerwald style kitchen and contains articles brought from Austria by the Kohler family. The second level also contained a werk zimmer (work room), a stube (living room), a traditional style bedroom and a meeting room for the Girl scouts dedicated to Sir Robert Baden-Powell the founder of the Scout Movement.

The third floor contains a keeper's apartment with two bedrooms, a living room, a kitchen and a bathroom. The wardrobe for theatricals is also on the third floor.

The interior contain many rich carvings, wrought-iron craftsmanship, stained glass, Austrian furniture and tapestries.

The exterior of the building contains an example of a Nodus Sundial. It is also an example of a Vertical declining sundial as it is on a vertical wall and the wall does not face due south. The dial shows the seasons as indicated by Zodiac symbols but will only show the time from sunrise to noon.

The building was officially dedicated on July 26, 1931.

The building was the venue for most of the lecturers that were part of the Kohler Distinguished Guest Series beginning in 1944. Many of the musical and performing arts events were also held there until the opening of the Kohler Memorial theater at the Kohler High School in 1957.

The building is still used for special community performances by the Kohler Foundation. The house is open daily (except holidays) to the public for free guided tours.

== Gallery ==
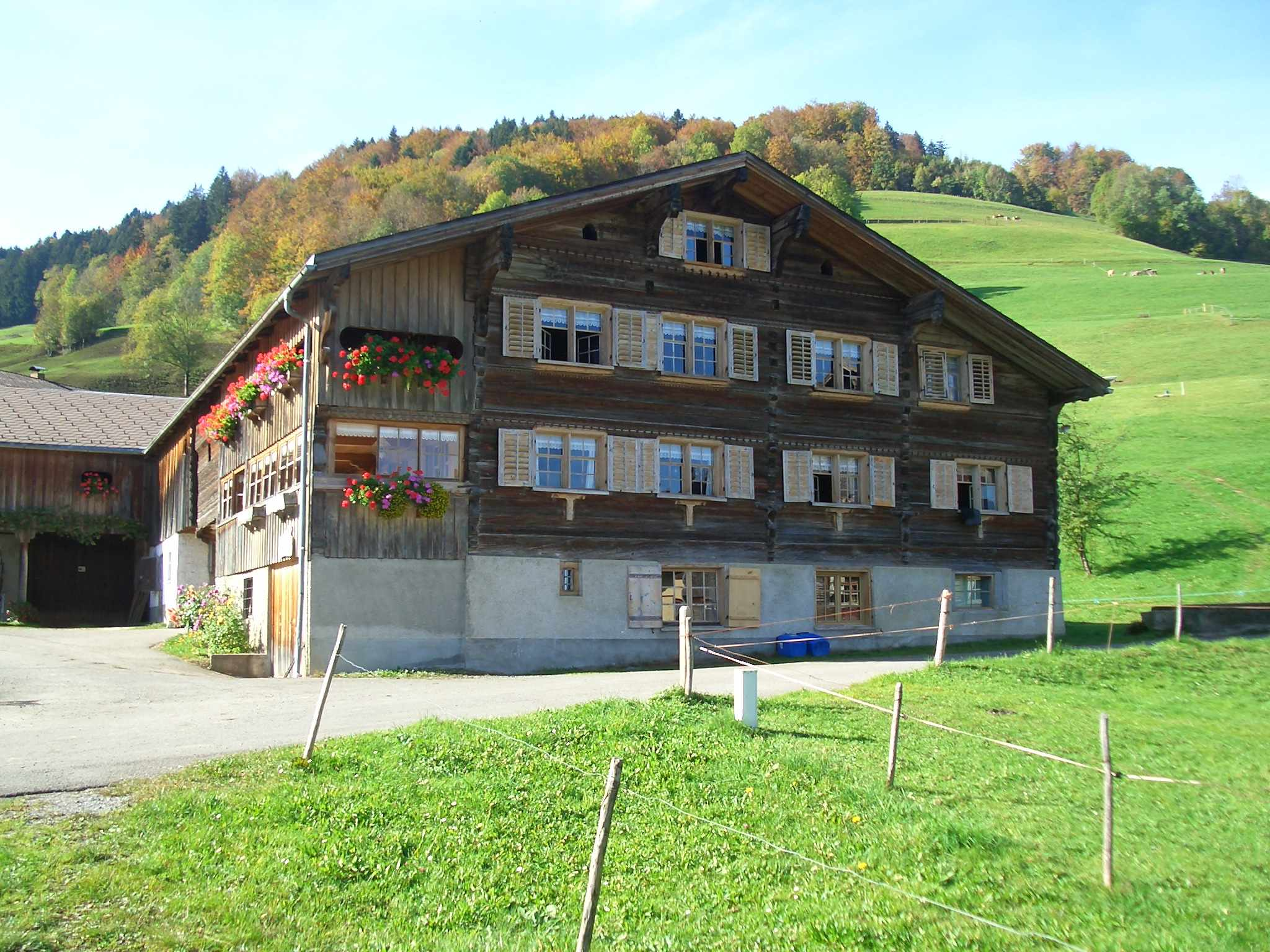
A typical house in Schwarzenberg, Austria

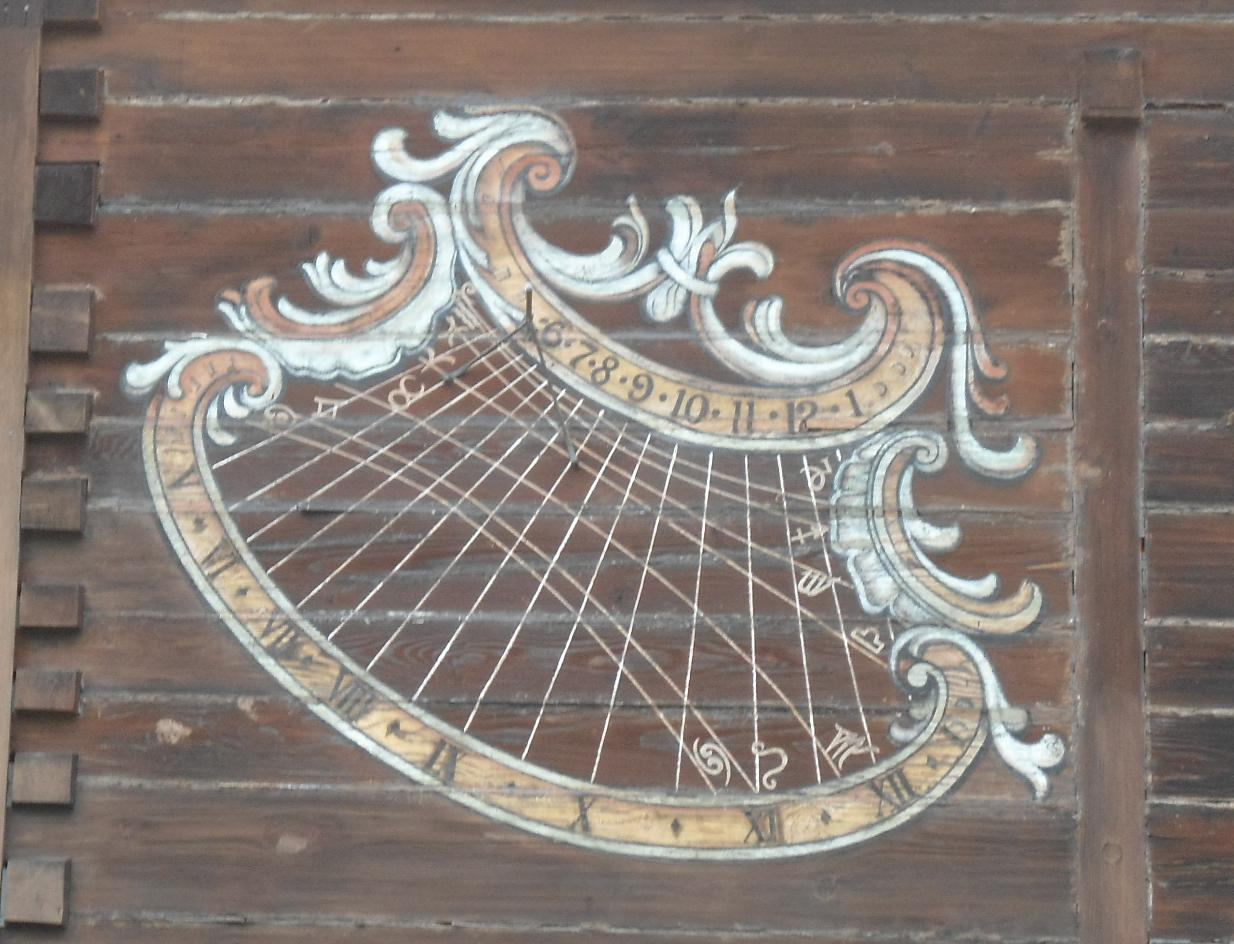
Waelderhaus Sundial
