= Flambeau Paper Company Office Building =

- U.S. National Register of Historic Places
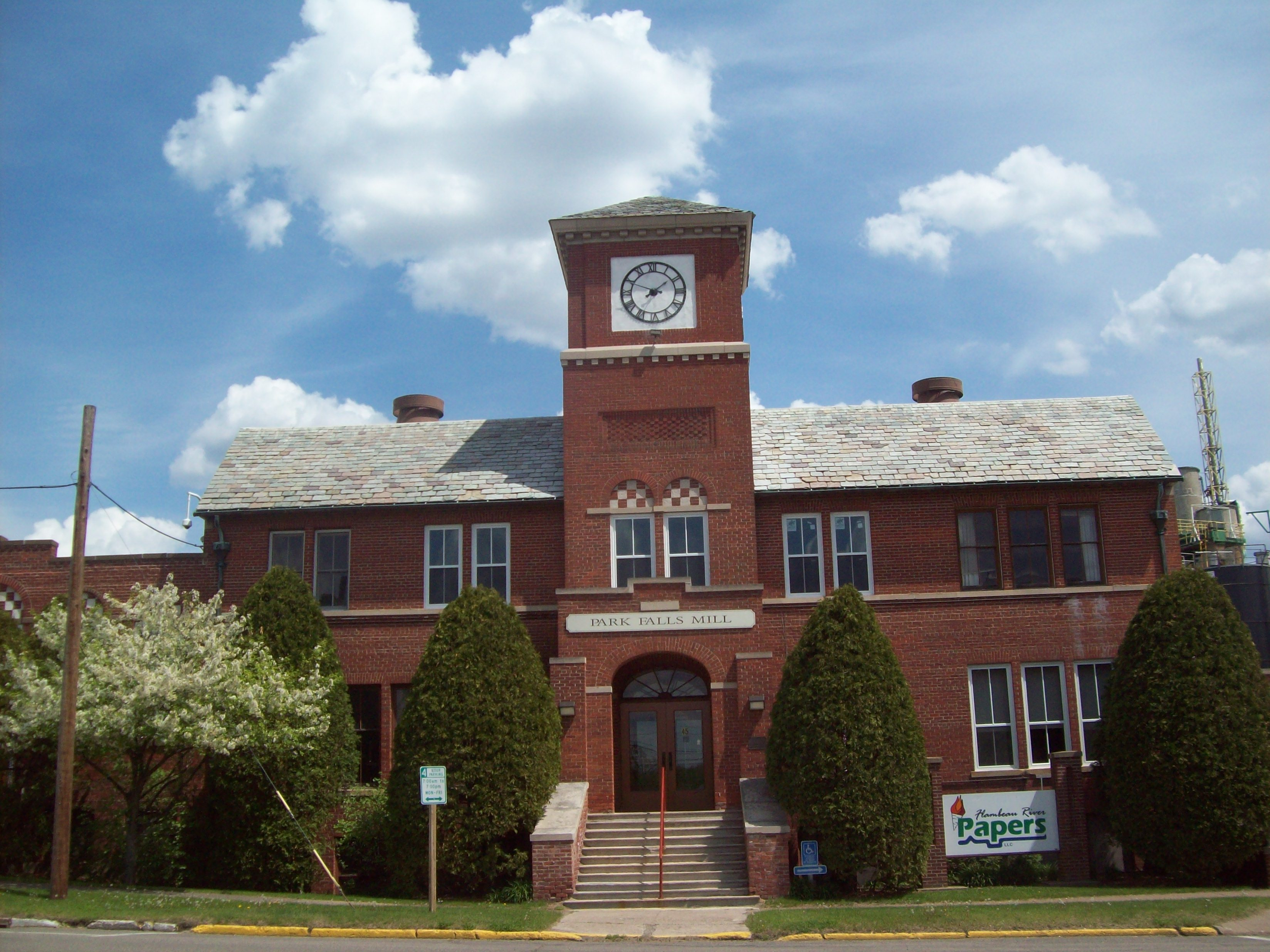
- Flambeau Paper Company Office Building
- Location: 200 N. First Ave. Park Falls, Wisconsin
- Coordinates: 45.93612°N 90.44754°W
- Built: 1925-1928
- Architect: Richard Philipp
- NRHP reference No.: 85002331
- Added to NRHP: September 12, 1985

The Flambeau Paper Company Office Building is located in Park Falls, Wisconsin. It was added to the National Register of Historic Places in 1985.
