= Marie Christine Kohler =

American philanthropist from Sheboygan, Wisconsin

- Born: July 13, 1876; Sheboygan, Wisconsin
- Died: October 11, 1943 (aged 67); Sheboygan, Wisconsin
- Known for: Founding of Kohler Foundation, Inc.

Marie Christine Kohler (July 13, 1876 – October 11, 1943) was a member of the Kohler family of Wisconsin and was prominent in the community life of Sheboygan and Kohler, active in social work and better homes projects, and was well known for her philanthropic deeds.

== Biography ==
Miss Kohler was born in Sheboygan, Wisconsin On July 13, 1876, the fourth child of John Michael Kohler II and Elizabeth Lillie Vollrath. She was educated in the Sheboygan public schools and was a graduate of the University of Wisconsin (1901). For a number of years she taught English literature at the Sheboygan High School, and she was secretary of the Kohler Company from 1905 to 1909.

Kohler was instrumental in construction of the Waelderhaus in the Village of Kohler. It was designed by Austrian architect Kaspar Albrecht and was designed as a tribute to the tradition of Bregenzerwald (forest of Bregenz) Province of Vorarlberg, Austria. The name Waelderhaus (ger. wälderhaus) means forest house. The building was dedicated to the use of the girl scouts upon completion in 1931.

== Social and Philanthropic work ==
She was Instrumental in organizing the Sheboygan County Chapter of the American Red Cross in 1916, and helped to organize branches of the Red Cross and the Junior Red Cross in the schools.

She started the Girl Scouts movement at Kohler in 1919.

Miss Kohler was one of the organizers of the American Association of University Women in 1924 and presided at its first meeting. She was president of the Wisconsin Conference of Social Work at the time the state legislature passed the children's code and she was very influential in the passage of the code.

Miss Kohler was a member of then Secretary of Commerce Herbert Hoover's committee on house building and home ownership. Along these lines she was also state chairman of the Better Homes in America organization.

She was chairman of the Sheboygan Better Cities contest sponsored by the Wisconsin Conference of Social Work in 1924 and 1925.

She was active in the organization of the Sheboygan department of public recreation in 1921 and 1926. Miss Kohler was active in the Federation of Woman's clubs for many years and served as a delegate for Wisconsin to the national convention in New York City in 1916. She was state chairman of the community service committee of the Wisconsin Federation of Woman's clubs.

She Instituted the Sheboygan County Children's board in 1930 under the state code. Under her leadership, Sheboygan county was the first in the state to have a paid worker In this field.

In the late 1930s, Miss Kohler was chairman of the Woman's Field Army in its fight against cancer, and under her guidance Sheboygan County was outstanding in this work in the state.

== Later years ==
In 1940, along with her sisters, Evangeline Kohler and Lillie B. Kohler, her 3/4-brother, Herbert V. Kohler Sr. and O.A. Kroos, she co-founded the Kohler Foundation, Inc.

Marie was chairman of the Scouting Council of the Girl Scouts and directed the construction of the Waelderhaus for their headquarters in 1941. The building was also dedicated as a memorial to her father John Micheal Kohler.

She died on October 11, 1943, at St. Nicholas hospital after an illness. She was never married and had no heirs.

Her will made specific bequests including $5000 to the Wisconsin Alumni Research Foundation, $10,000 to the University of Wisconsin Regents student loan fund and the major portion of the estate going to the Kohler Foundation.
