= La Crosse State Teachers College Training School Building =

- U.S. National Register of Historic Places
- Morris Hall
- Location: 1615 State St. La Crosse, Wisconsin
- Coordinates: 43.81339°N 91.23199°W
- Architect: Brust and Brust
- NRHP reference No.: 99000850
- Added to NRHP: July 15, 1999

The La Crosse State Teachers College Training School Building was a building used to educate teachers at the University of Wisconsin–La Crosse in La Crosse, Wisconsin. The building is at 1615 State Street in La Crosse. The present building was built in 1940 and was known was the Campus School.

The Campus School continued until 1973, when it closed and was renamed Morris Hall in honor of Thomas Morris, who was instrumental in the establishment of the University of Wisconsin–La Crosse.

== Sources ==
- Recollections 1909–1973 Campus School—University of Wisconsin–La Crosse, Susan Hessel, 1992, the University of Wisconsin–La Crosse Foundation. Courtesy of the La Crosse Public Library archives.
