= Riverbend (estate) =

Historic house in Wisconsin, United States

- Riverbend Estate
- U.S. National Register of Historic Places
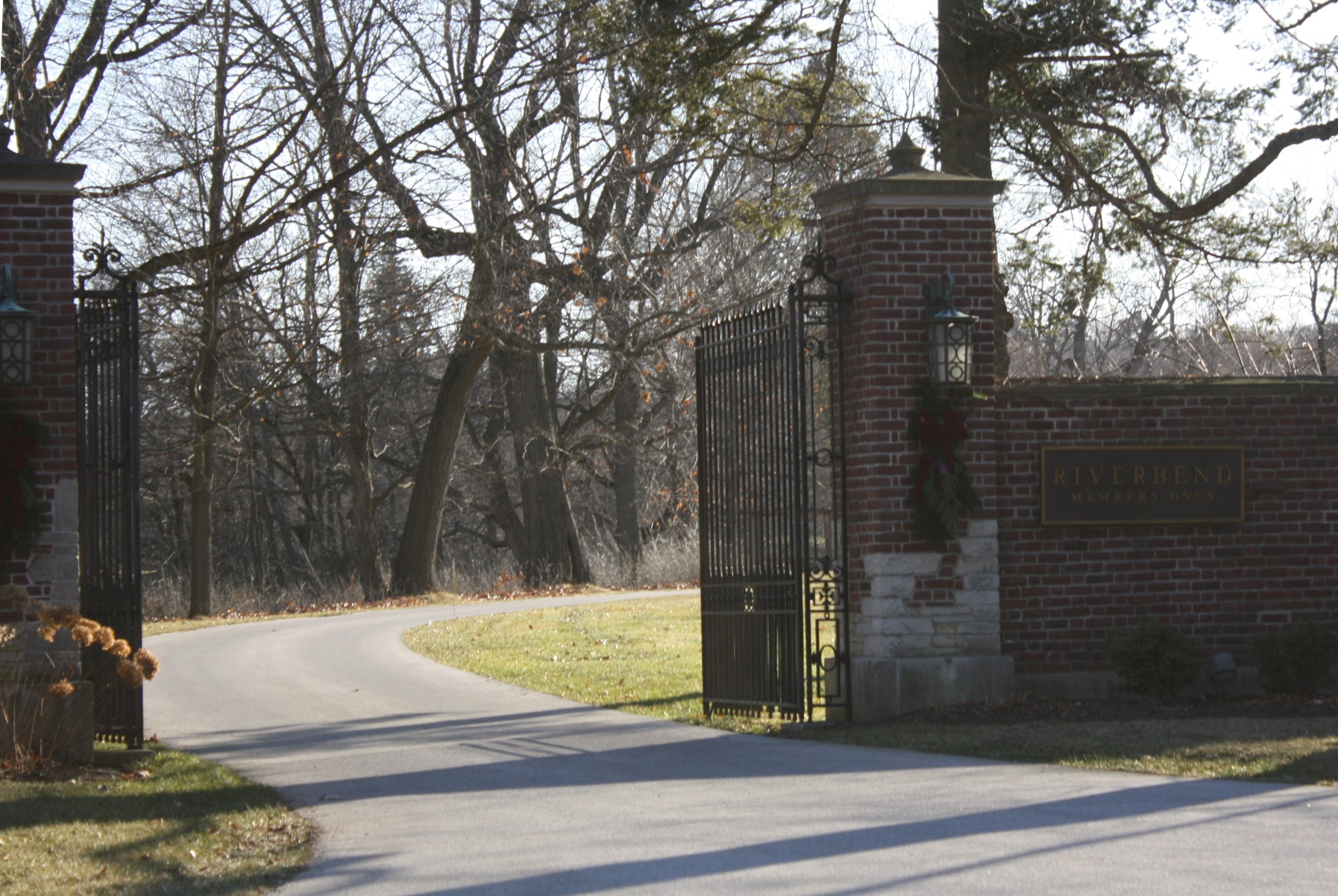
- Riverbend Estate

- Location within Wisconsin
- Location: 1161 W. Lower Falls Road; Kohler, Wisconsin; United States
- Coordinates: 43°43′44″N 87°47′26″W
- Built: 1922–1923
- Architect: Richard Philipp
- NRHP reference No.: 80000197

The Kohler Riverbend Estate is an historic property located in Kohler, Wisconsin. It was built in 1922–1923 by Walter J. Kohler Sr., then governor of Wisconsin and president of the Kohler Company. It was reported to cost in excess of $1,000,000 to construct (equivalent to $18,900,000 in 2025).

== History ==
Kohler commissioned architect Richard Philipp, of the Milwaukee firm of Brust & Philipp, to design the house. Phillip had previously designed a house for Walter's father, John Michael Kohler. Phillip had also previously worked on the Kohler Village for Walter Kohler, designing most of the new structures built from 1916 through the mid-1920s. Kohler commissioned the Olmsted Brothers, well known for creating Central Park in New York City and the Harvard and Stanford campuses, to design the grounds of the estate.

The grounds were landscaped in the English tradition to accentuate the natural beauty of the site that captivated Walter and his wife Charlotte. The design of the house and grounds was inspired during trips that they made to Great Britain and Europe.

Throughout the 1920s and 1930s, Riverbend was a gathering place for social occasions. Walter and Charlotte entertained their guests on a grand scale.

Walter Kohler died in 1940 and his Charlotte died in 1947. In 1948 The property was purchased by his son, John Michael Kohler III, and his wife Julilly House Kohler. John and Julilly would continue the tradition opening the house to the public and of hosting large events. John Kohler died in 1968 and Julilly died in 1976.

The property was added to the National Register of Historic Places in 1980.

The house was acquired from Walter's descendants by the National Trust for Historic Preservation. The Kohler Co. in turn purchased Riverbend in 1985 from the Trust. The house sat empty for about 15 years until the restoration effort was begun in March 2000. The home was expanded and remodeled with a four-story addition added at the east end, and opened in 2001 as an exclusive private membership club.

The house currently features 31 guest rooms, two dining rooms, solarium, living room, Rathskeller, meeting rooms, spa with treatment areas, steam room, sauna, whirlpool, and an indoor-outdoor year-round swim-through pool.

== Architecture ==
=== House ===
The house is a prime example of Tudor Revival architecture. The house was considered architecturally significant enough that it was included in the book Great Houses of America along with 29 other houses such as Monticello, Biltmore, The Breakers, and Lyndhurst. The house was notable, partly because unlike most Tudor Revival homes constructed in the time period, it was not designed with a modern interior. There was much effort to use typical old-world materials and craftsmanship in the construction.

The house as constructed, was a three-story building with no rigid floor plan and approximately 50 rooms. The exterior is a complex of gables, dormers, hip roofs, turrets and varied offsets. The exterior was primarily brick with varied cut stone insertions in areas such as corners and windows. Some of the faces under the gable ends were finished in a smooth light stucco. The open solarium in the southern facade was surrounded in four-centred archways supporting additional floors of living space above. Many of the windows were divide into triple sections by stone mullions.

The interiors, while not a strict reproduction of authentic Tuder style, contained many natural materials like stone and timbers. Other design elements included tiled floors, carved stone fireplaces, and stained glass medallions in the windows.

The main door leading into the great hall contained leaded glass divided lites. This large room measured 20 by 42 feet and was paved with Vermont granite slabs, a wooden ceiling supported by cased oak beams, white stucco walls and numerous four-centred arch openings. The main feature of the room is a massive fireplace built of carved Madison sandstone.

Many of the rooms contained vaulted ceiling and the hallway ceilings were typically varied combinations of different sizes of intersecting vaults. An unusual octagonal circular stairway leads from the second floor to the third.

The house was furnished with many antiques such as Kurdistan rugs, William and Mary highback chairs, Flemish tapestries, a Queen Anne bookcase (c. 1719), and a Chippendale chest (c. 1780). Most of the antiques were imported.

The fashion in the twenties for interiors emphasized ample draperies and heavy wall hangings. Dark walls and upholstery, furniture in dark woods like Jacobean oak and William and Mary walnut were also common. In the late 1940s after acquiring the house, John and Julilly made changes to bring more light into the house. Changes included lighter curtains around the widows, first floor walls and ceilings painted mostly white, bedrooms in pastel colors or papered, removing heavy draperies and wall hangings and substituting lighter fabrics and colors whenever possible.

The original house had in excess of 28,000 square feet of floor space. The addition, constructed in 2000–2001, added more than 10,000 square feet to the house. The addition was constructed with design information from the original architect to be as true to the house as possible. The addition contains four floors, making it taller than the original house but efforts were made to make it match as closely as possible. Restoration work to the original house involved matching many different types of plaster work including repairs to many elaborate detailed ornamental features. Much of the original plaster had to be removed and replaced due to moisture causing the different layers to delaminate. It was estimated that about 80% of the original ceiling detail was saved. Exterior restoration work included replacing much of the original stucco on the gables ends with a modern EIFS in matching textures and colors.

=== Landscape ===
The primary elements of the landscaping are rustic stone walls, rock gardens, sunken lawns an allée of evergreens, formal beds, and a bowling green. An unusual feature of the landscaping was the focus on an unusual box-elder tree with a span in excess of 100 feet. The longest lower limbs dipped to ground level rooting themselves. A painting of the tree by Charlotte, titled Earthbound, was featured in a gallery display of Wisconsin art sponsored by The Milwaukee Journal, in 1930. The tree began to die in the 1970s and is now gone.
