= Peter Brust =

Peter J. Brust (November 4, 1869 – June 22, 1946) was an American architect, and fellow of the American Institute of Architects, who practiced his craft from approximately 1893 to 1946, in Milwaukee, Wisconsin. Brust designed hundreds of residential, ecclesiastical (churches, convents, chapels, monasteries, rectories, and seminaries), business, school, medical, public, memorial, recreation, and theater commissions. In 1906, Peter Brust partnered with Richard Philipp and formed the architecture firm of Brust & Philipp. By the 1920s, the firm was the largest architectural firm in Wisconsin. In 1938, Peter Brust established the firm of Brust & Brust with his sons John and Paul. The firm remained in that name until 1973 when it became Brust-Zimmerman.

The residential designs of Peter Brust were overwhelmingly influenced by Old English architecture. Brust didn't intend to bring medieval architecture to Milwaukee, but rather bring the best of English tradition and infuse into his designs. The English influence on house design was felt across America from the 1880s into the 1940s. The Tudor Revival craze (influenced by wealthy Americans) hit Milwaukee in the 1920s and 1930s, which Brust & Phillip capitalized on. Brust's commissions have been placed on the National Register of Historic Places . In addition, numerous Brust commissions were featured in Western Architecture throughout the 1910s, 1920s, and 1930s.

Works include (with attribution):

- St. Joseph's Chapel, 1501 South Layton Boulevard, Milwaukee, WI (Brust and Philipp), contributing building to the National Register-listed South Layton Boulevard Historic DistrictNRHP-listed
- Kohler Company Factory Complex, 444 Highland Dr., Kohler, WI (Brust and Philipp), NRHP-listed
- La Crosse State Teachers College Training School Building, 1615 State St., La Crosse, Wisconsin (Brust and Brust), NRHP-listed
- One or more works in Pearl and Grand Avenue Historic District, Pearl Ave. bounded by Grand Ave. and Franklin St. and portions of Pleasant and Division Sts., Mukwonago, WI (Brust & Brust), NRHP-listed
- South Branch Library, 931 W. Madison St., Milwaukee, WI (Brust, Peter), NRHP-listed
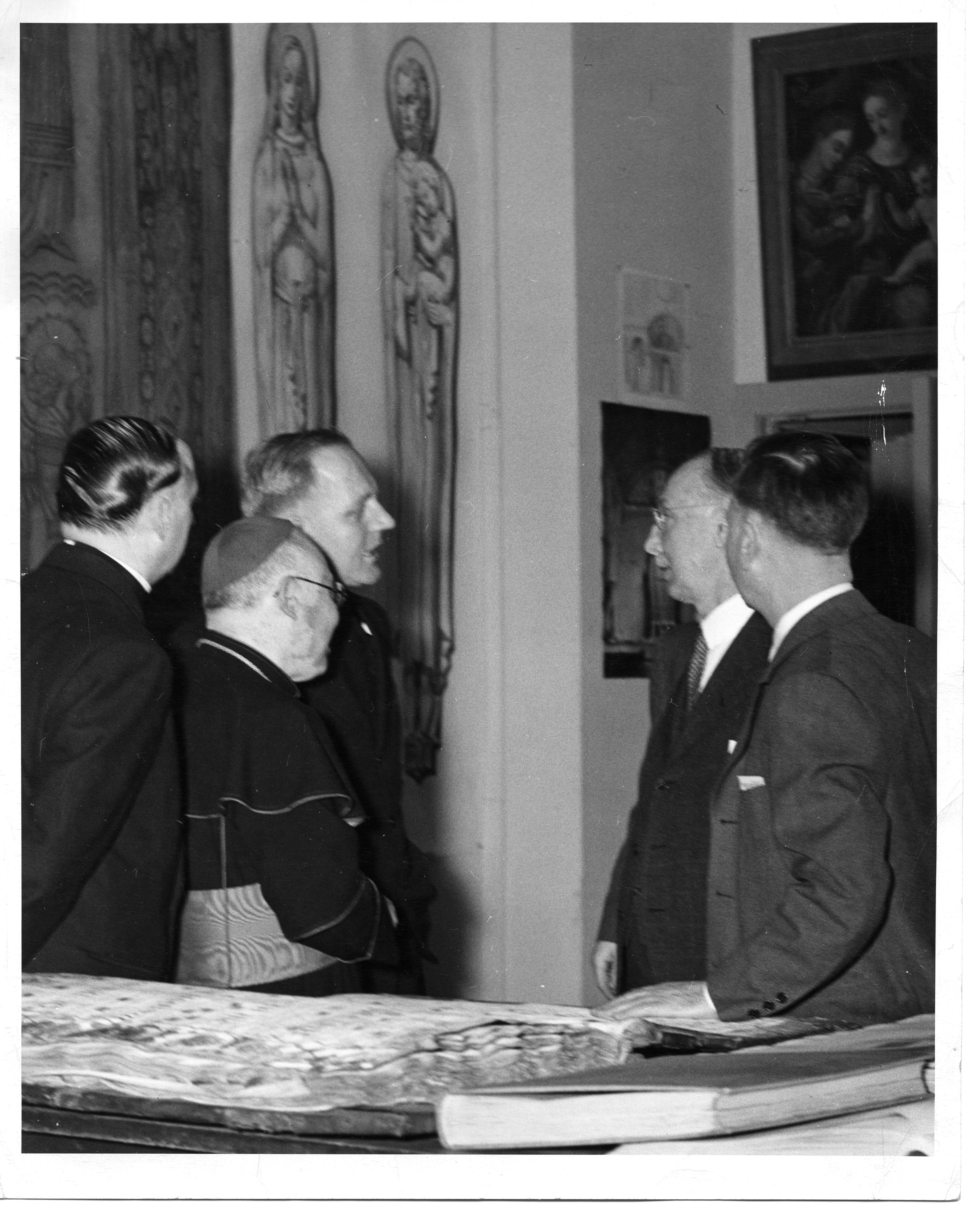
Architect Peter Brust (second from right)
