= Kohler Foundation =

Kohler Foundation, Inc.
- Founded: 1940
- Founders: Evangeline Kohler; Marie Christine Kohler; Lillie B. Kohler; Herbert V. Kohler Sr. O. A. Kroos
- Location: Kohler, Wisconsin
- Services: Art preservation; Grants; Scholarships; Performing arts
- Website: www.kohlerfoundation.org

The Kohler Foundation, Inc., is a philanthropic organization that works in the areas of art preservation, grants, scholarships, and performing arts.

== History ==
Kohler Foundation was founded in 1940 by Evangeline Kohler, Marie Christine Kohler, Lillie B. Kohler, Herbert V. Kohler Sr., and O. A. Kroos. The original stated purpose of the Foundation was to fund programs supporting the aged and infirm, orphans, students, victims of floods, famine, epidemics, tornados, and other national emergencies.

Marie Kohler died in 1943, and her will specified that the major portion of her estate went to the Kohler Foundation.

== Building projects ==
Marie Christine Kohler was instrumental in construction of the Waelderhaus (German for "forest house") in the Village of Kohler, completed in 1931 and initially intended for use by the Kohler Women's Club and the Girl Scouts. Designed by Austrian architect Kaspar Albrecht, it is a tribute to the traditions of the Bregenz Forest region of western Austria. Currently managed by the Kohler Foundation, the building is open for tours and available for events.

In 1950, the Foundation purchased the Wade House in Greenbush, Wisconsin, for restoration and preservation. After renovation was completed, the Wade House was turned over to State Historical Society of Wisconsin.

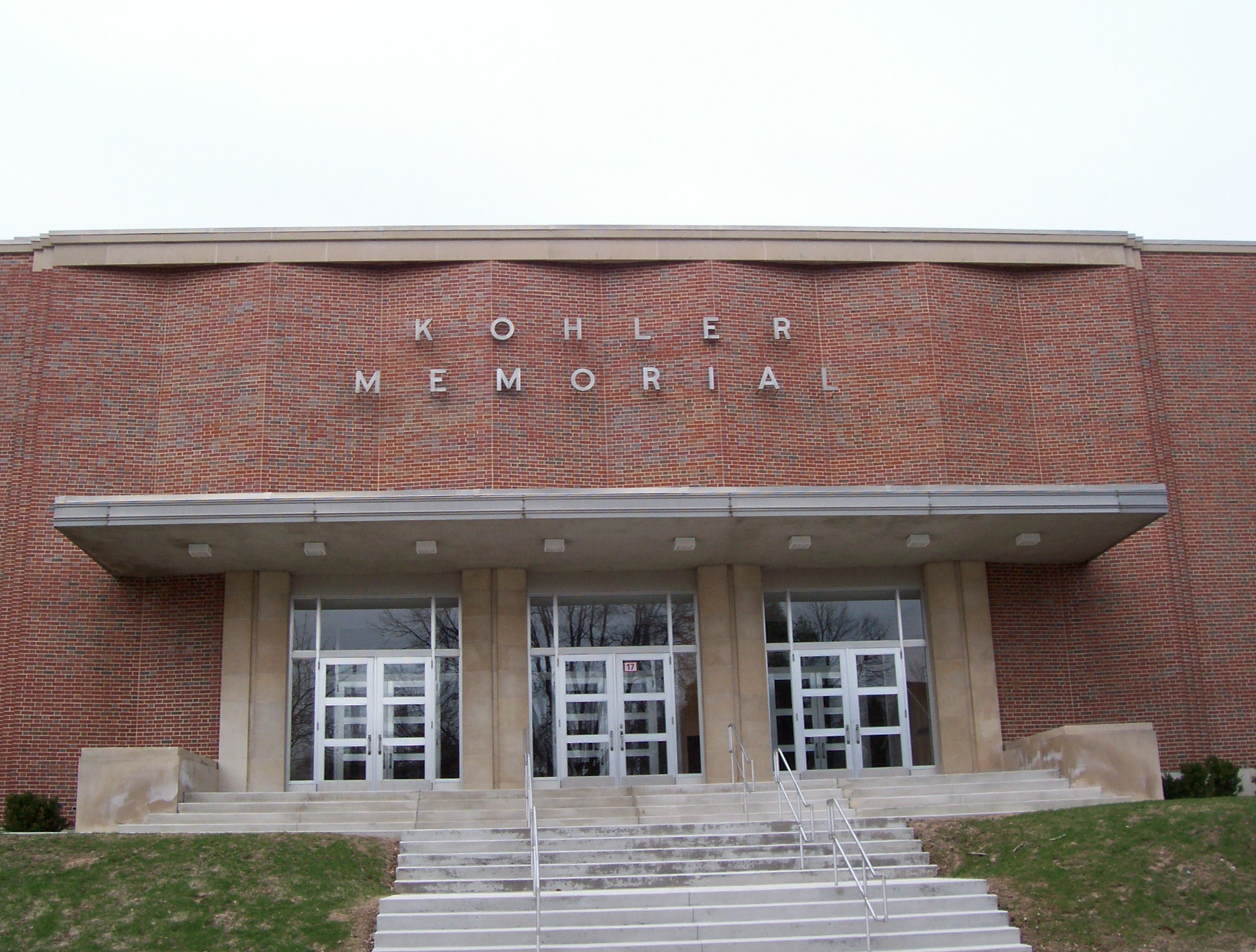
Kohler Memorial

The Foundation was a major sponsor of the construction of the Kohler Memorial addition to the Kohler public school which opened in 1957. The Foundation contributed $300,000. The other major contributors to the project were a trust from the late Governor Walter J. Kohler Sr. worth $500,000, the Village of Kohler, and the Joint School District No. 2. The building cost $1,500,000 to construct and comprised a grand theater, gymnasium, indoor-outdoor swimming pool, and a youth center. After it was opened, the building's theater became the venue for events of the Distinguished Guest Series.

Also in 1957, the hospital in Plymouth, Wisconsin, completed an addition to which the Foundation contributed $60,000 for the construction of the east wing, named the Kohler Wing.

In 1966, the Foundation gifted the Kohler homestead on New York Avenue in Sheboygan to the Sheboygan Arts Foundation, Inc., to establish a community arts center. It was named the John Michael Kohler Arts Center.

In 1980, the Foundation purchased the Painted Forest building in Valton, Wisconsin. Originally constructed by the Modern Woodmen of America in the late 1800s, its entire interior was painted in folk art style by the itinerant artist Ernest Hűpeden in 1898–1899. The Foundation restored the building and entrusted it to Sauk County, Wisconsin, with the Historical Society of the Upper Baraboo Valley acting as custodian. Sauk County returned the site to the Foundation in 2001. Following additional infrastructure work, the Foundation gifted the Painted Forest to Edgewood College in 2004. The Foundation also constructed an art studio and study center in Valton and dedicated it to Edgewood College in 2005.

== Arts ==
In 1944 the Kohler Women's Club established the Distinguished Guest Series, sponsoring concerts, plays and speakers, such as the Salzburg Marionettes, the Robert Shaw Chorale, and the singer William Warfield. In May 1953 it was announced that the Kohler Foundation would join the Kohler Women's Club as a co-sponsor of the series. This change followed the death of Ruth DeYoung-Kohler in March 1953. The series continues to run, and the 2023–24 season is its 80th year.

In 1970 the Kohler Foundation, along with the Kohler Company and the estate of Herbert V. Kohler Sr., contributed funds to found of the Kohler Art Library in the newly constructed Elvehjem Art Center at the University of Wisconsin. The total construction cost of the Elvehjem was $3.5 million. The art library is still housed in the art center along with Chazen Museum of Art.

In 1998, the foundation acquired the home of Loy Allen Bowlin, known as "The Original Rhinestone Cowboy." It was dismantled and donated to the John Michael Kohler Art Center, where it was reconstructed and is preserved as a folk art treasure.

== Scholarships ==
The Kohler family has a history of funding college scholarship dating to 1927 when the Kohler Family Scholarships were established with two endowment funds, one for boys and one for girls, each in the amount of $10,000. The initial amount of the scholarship was a total of no more than $500 to each recipient. This fund was administered by the University of Wisconsin Board of Regents. The endowment was increased in 1943 by an additional $10,000 by the estate of Marie Kolher. The funds in the scholarship endowments are periodically increased by the Kohler Foundation.

In 1955, the Kohler Foundation began financing a resident graduate fellowship program called the Marie Christine Kohler Fellowship at the University of Wisconsin. Until 2012, students in the program were housed in the former governor's mansion dubbed the Knapp House. The Foundation continues to support graduate fellowships at the university's Wisconsin Institute for Discovery (WID). The fund is currently known as the Marie Christine Kohler Fellows @ WID. Fellows receive an annual stipend of $3,000.

== Other funding ==
The Foundation and the Kohler family have also supported the International Crane Foundation by funding education and research and aiding with transportation. In 1978, the Patrick and Anna M. Cudahy Fund and Kohler Foundation, Inc., supported a full-time educator. Funding was also given for crane habitat studies in China. In the late 1990s members of the family began transporting Siberian crane eggs between Asia and Baraboo with company jets and continued to do so for a number of years.
