= Richard Philipp =

American architect

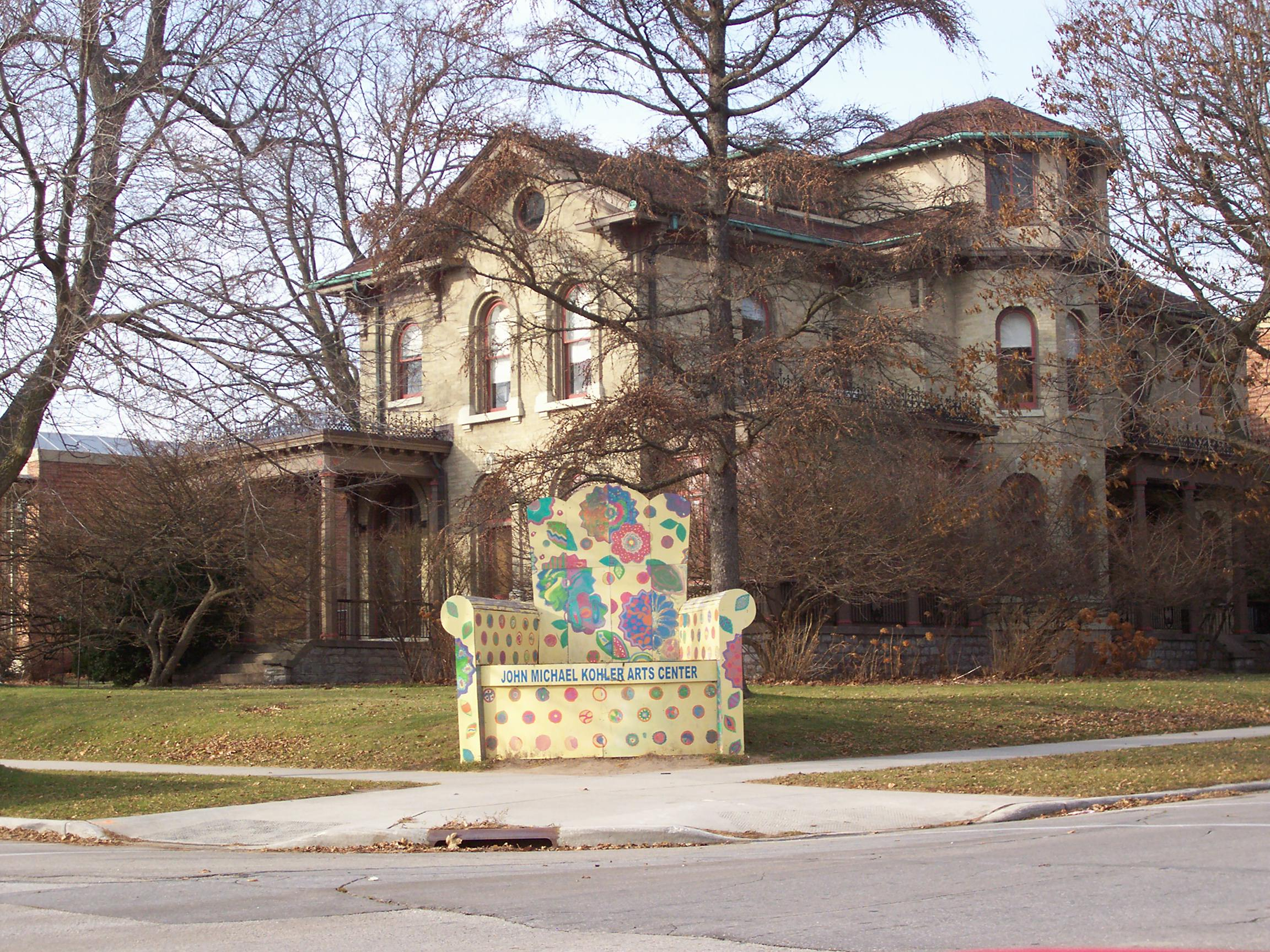
John Michael Kohler House

Richard Philipp (August 2, 1874 - March 15, 1959) was an American architect.

Beginning in 1906, he partnered with Peter Brust in the firm of Brust & Philipp based in Milwaukee, Wisconsin. He was primarily known for his work done for the Kohler family, most prominently the planning of the company settlement of Village of Kohler, Wisconsin, commissioned by Walter J. Kohler Sr. between 1916 and the mid-1920s.

== Early life and education ==
Philipp was born in Mayville, Wisconsin to German immigrant parents Julius Philipp (1824-1894) and Anna Sophia (née Melcher; 1834-1900), both born in the Kingdom of Prussia. He had a modest upbringing with eight siblings. He attended local public schools and would later pursue studies in architecture under Dr. Gerhard Balg.

== Career ==
Between 1892-1906 he worked as a draftsman at several architecture firms, before forming Brust & Philipp in Milwaukee, Wisconsin with his business partner Peter Brust. This practice existed until 1927, after that he decided to work independently, where he primarily served as the architect to the Kohler family as well as for Lawrence College in Appleton, Wisconsin. Richard Philipp has been listed as notable architect by Marquis Who's Who. He was a former president of the Fellow American Institute Architects of the Wisconsin chapter.

== Family ==
On August 23, 1923 he married Ella Smith. The couple had no children.

== Selected works ==
A number of his works are listed on the U.S. National Register of Historic Places.

Works include (with attribution):

- American Club, High St., Kohler, Wisconsin (Philipp, Richard), NRHP-listed
- Flambeau Paper Company Office Building, 200 N. First Ave., Park Falls, Wisconsin (Philipp, Richard), NRHP-listed
- Holy Hill, 1525 Carmel Rd., Erin, Wisconsin (Philipp, Richard), NRHP-listed
- Kohler Company Factory Complex, 444 Highland Dr., Kohler, Wisconsin (Brust and Philipp), NRHP-listed
- John Michael Kohler House, 608 New York Ave., Sheboygan, Wisconsin (Philipp, Richard), NRHP-listed
- Riverbend, Walter J. Kohler Sr. house, 1025 W Riverside Dr., Kohler, Wisconsin (Brust and Philipp), NRHP-listed
- Gustave Pabst Estate, 36100 Genesee Lake Rd., Summit, Wisconsin (Philipp, Richard), NRHP-listed
- One or more works in Third Avenue Historic District, along Third Ave. between 61st and 66th Sts., Kenosha, Wisconsin (Philipp, Richard), NRHP-listed
