= Kaspar Albrecht =

Austrian architect and sculptor

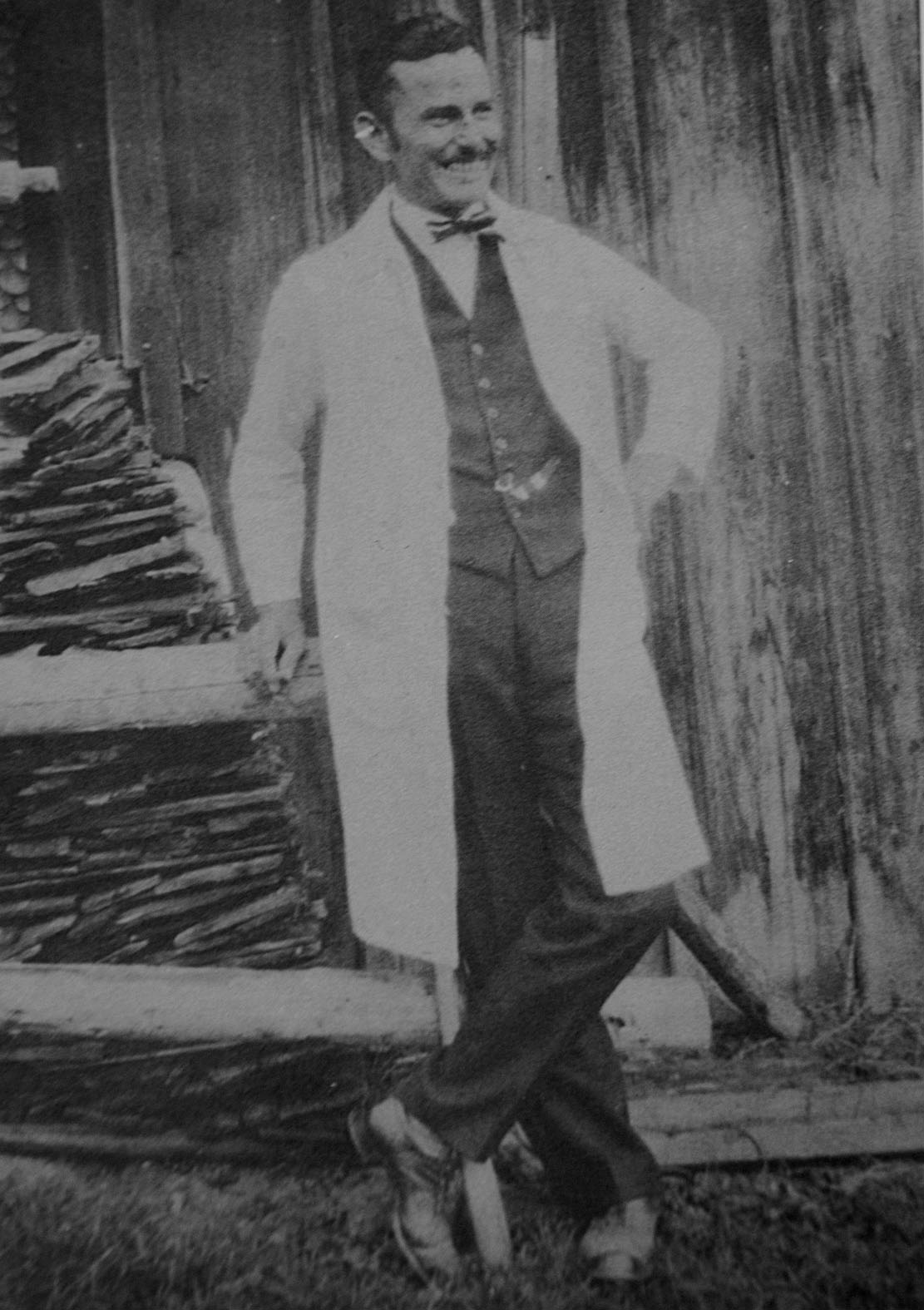
- Kaspar Albrecht circa 1928
- Born: 22 August 1889; Au, Vorarlberg, Austria
- Died: 25 March 1970 (aged 80); Rehmen, Austria
- Occupations: Architect and sculptor
- Known for: Waelderhaus

Kaspar Albrecht (22 August 1889 – 25 March 1970) was an Austrian architect and sculptor.

== Biography ==
Kaspar Albrecht grew up in a large family in Rehmen, Austria, in rather poor conditions in Bregenzerwald. He attended the State Trade School in Innsbruck from 1906 to 1910 to begin his artistic training. He then studied at the Municipal Commercial School in Munich and at the Academy of Fine Arts Vienna with Josef Muellner. In addition to the sculptural work, he was also active architecturally.

During World War I, he was a lieutenant in the Tyrolean Kaiserjaeger for three years and was decorated with the Gold Medal of Courage, the highest award of its kind presented by the Austrian Army.

In 1920 an extensive remodeling and additions to the John Michael Kohler House were designed by Richard Philipp. Albrecht was involved with the design and creation of the decorative stained and leaded windows and glass cabinet doors.

As an architect, his biggest job was the Waelderhaus in Kohler Village, Wisconsin. John Michael Kohler, the father of the industrialist Walter J. Kohler Sr. also came from the Bregenzerwald. In addition to designing the Waelderhaus, Albrecht supervised construction from 1929 to 1931 and personally executed the many artistic pottery reliefs, wood cuts, maps, stained-glass windows, tapestry designs, bronze statues, and other handiwork.

In 1951, he was Member of the National Geographic Society (US).

Albrecht returned to Kohler in 1957 when he executed the bronze sculptured panel in the foyer of Kohler Memorial Theater. At this time he also created the life-sized figure of Old Abe the bald eagle that was the mascot of the 8th Wisconsin Volunteer Infantry Regiment during the Civil War. The figure was carved in basswood.

In 1961, he received the honorary award and in 1968 the silver decorations of Vorarlberg.

== Works ==
- 1922: Kaiserjäger monument in Bregenz, Fluher street in Bregenz, stone reliefs
- 1924: war memorial chapel Bezau, chapel building, as well as wood and clay reliefs
- 1927: war memorial memory portal in the church of St. Nicholas at the cemetery in Egg
- War memorial in the cemetery wall of Bizau
- Tombs in the municipal cemetery to the taxi park in Bregenz
- 1929: Waelderhaus, Wisconsin (opening 26 July 1931)
- 1932: Theresa Chapel in Ratzen, Schwarzenberg, Crucifixion
- 1934: War Memorial in Au
- 1935: Kuratienkirche St. Joseph in the district Rehmen in Au, crucifix.
- 1946: Chapel Bengat in Mellau, chapel buildings and facilities
- 1956/57: Parish Church Sts. Philip and James in Schoppernau, enlargement of the church and built a choir loft, memorial stone with portrait bust Jacob fields († 1924)
- 1957: plaque commemorating the Au Guild in Au
- 1964: Parish Church of St. Sebastian. in Langen near Bregenz, design the communion rail
- Altach parish church, baptismal font and stoup with reliefs

== Gallery ==
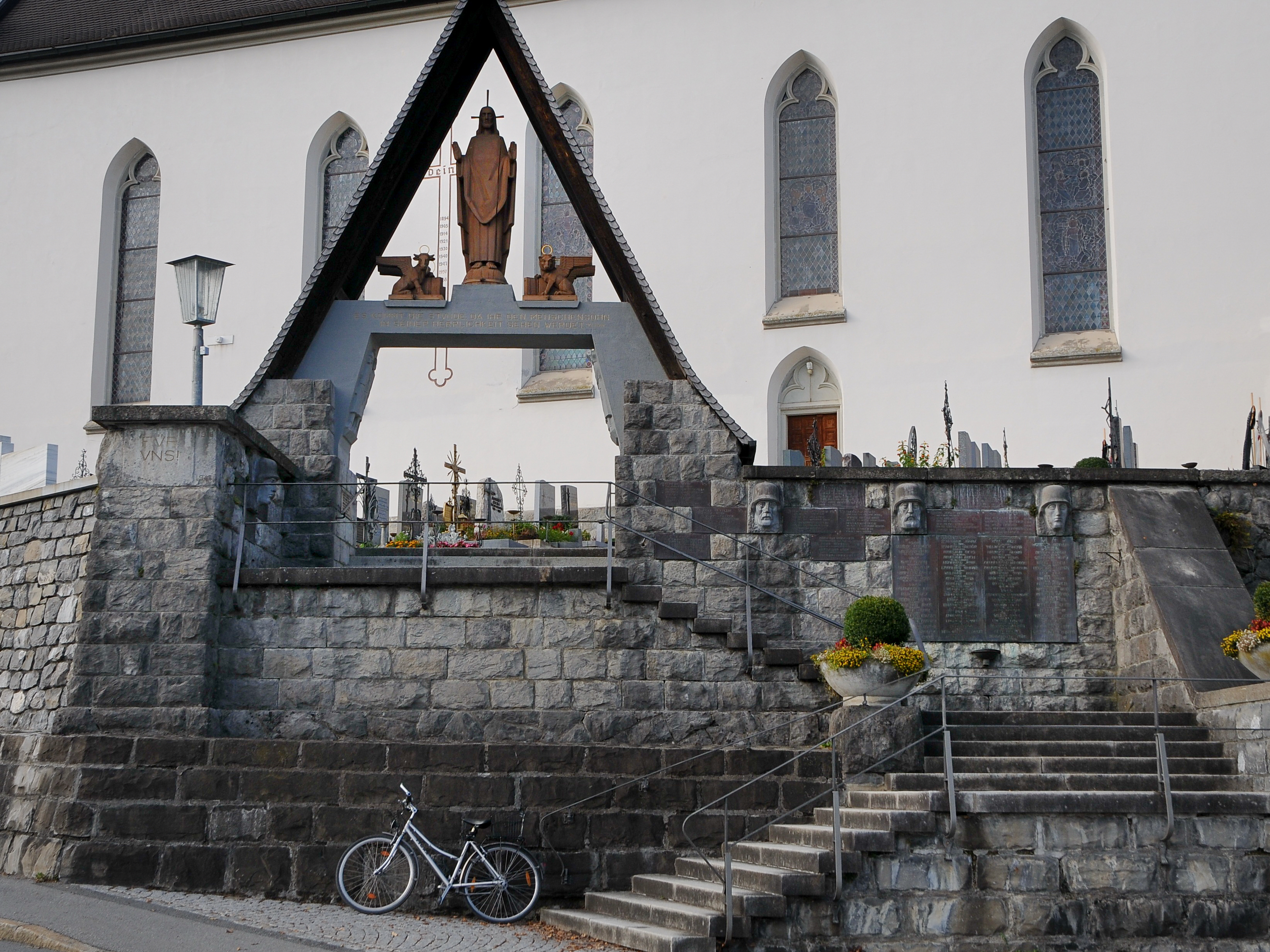
War memorial in Egg

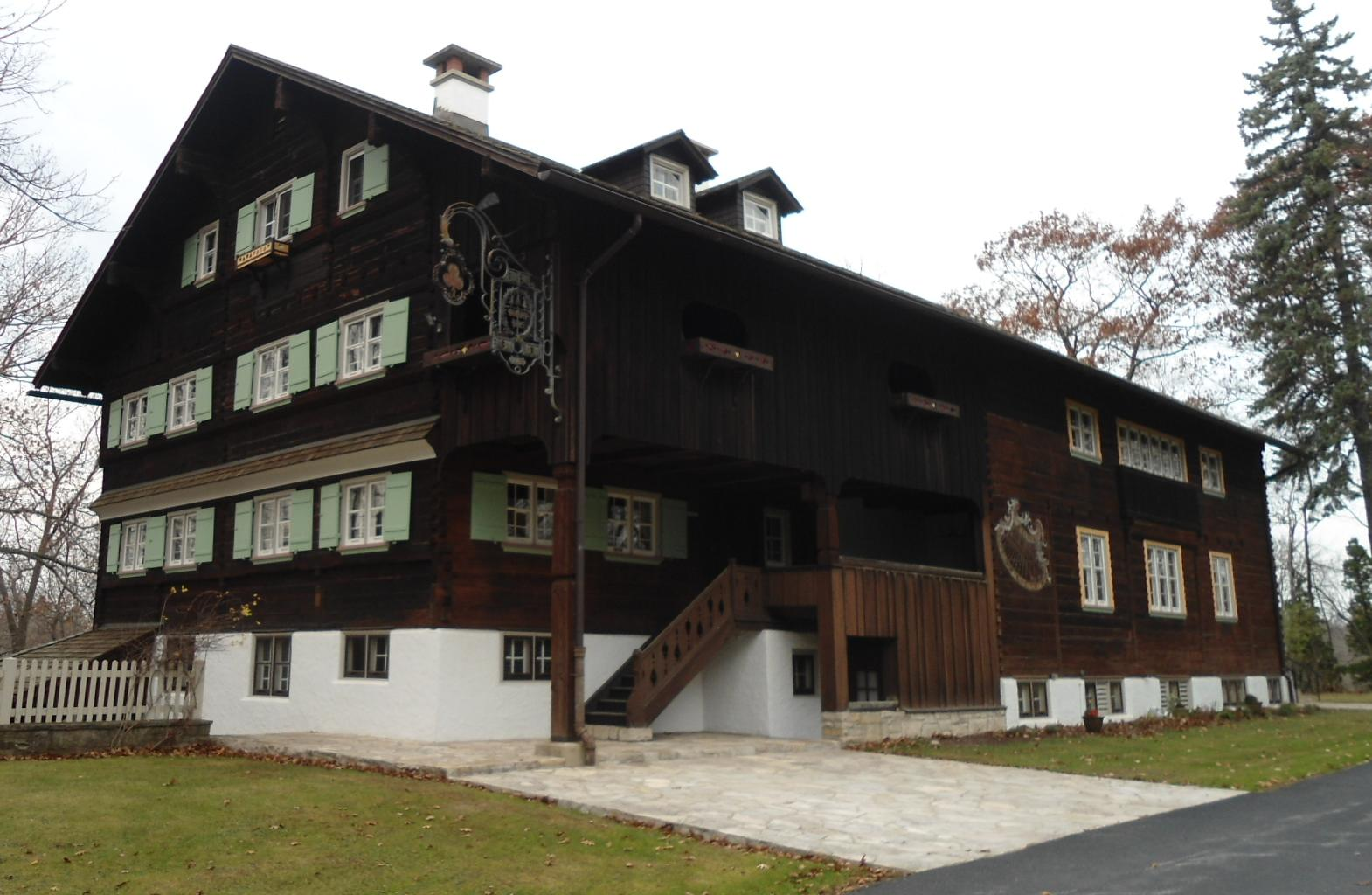
Bregenz Waelderhaus, Kohler, Wisconsin, United States

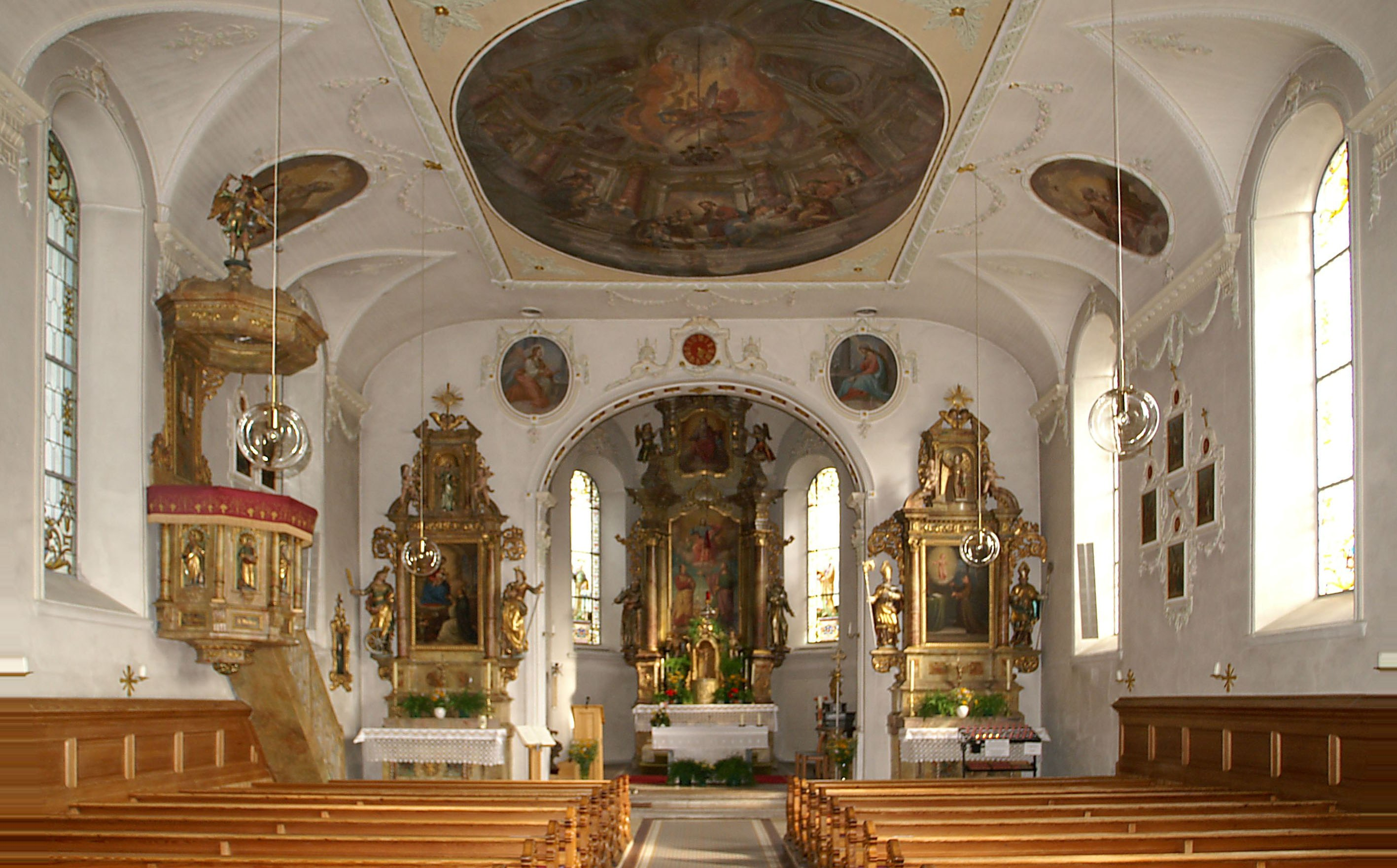
Schoppernau Church in the Bregenz Forest

== Bibliography ==
- DEHIO-Handbuch. Die Kunstdenkmäler Österreichs: Vorarlberg. Bundesdenkmalamt (Hrsg.), Verlag Anton Schroll & Co, Vienna 1983, ISBN 3-7031-0585-2, Künstlerverzeichnis.
- Helmut Swozilek: Kaspar Albrecht (1889-1970), Ausstellung der Gemeinde Au mit dem Vorarlberger Landesmuseum, Schulhaus Au, 29. Juli - 2. September 1990, Verlag Vorarlberger Landesmuseum, Bregenz 1990
