= Jens Bjerre (adventurer) =

Danish author, filmmaker, and adventurer (1921–2020)

- Born: 16 March 1921; Maribo, Denmark
- Died: 17 February 2020 (aged 98)
- Occupations: filmmaker, adventurer

Jens Bjerre (16 March 1921 – 17 February 2020) was a Danish author, filmmaker and adventurer. He trained as a journalist at newspapers in provincial Denmark before becoming political editor at Aftenbladet in Copenhagen in 1943–1947. During the German occupation of Denmark, Bjerre was active in the resistance group BOPA. In 1947, Bjerre embarked on a lifelong career as a freelance journalist by going to South Africa, where he lived among the San bushmen and studied their culture and customs. The following year, he returned and shot the documentary movie Kalahari, which gives an insight into the lives and rituals of this ancient people. In the mid-1960s, Bjerre spent almost a year among the nomadic aborigines of the Northern Territory in Australia. Jens Bjerre wrote five books about his travels and encounters with primitive people, which have been translated into 15 languages. His latest book was the memories Lost Worlds from (2005). Bjerre was chairman of the Danish branch of the Adventures Club in 1977.

== Travel writer ==
In 1947, Bjerre began working as a freelance travel journalist. He wrote articles for numerous Danish and international newspapers and magazines such as Life Magazine, Paris Match and The London Illustrated News, and he also produced radio features from Africa for the BBC.

== Scientific expeditions and lectures ==
Bjerre conducted scientific expeditions to the Kalahari Desert and the interior of Australia in collaboration with the Royal Geographical Society in London and the National Museum in Copenhagen. He also participated in several mapping expeditions to unknown areas of New Guinea on behalf of the Australian government, and co-organized and participated in the University of Copenhagen's Noona Dan-expedition to the Pacific in 1961–62. He collected cultural artefacts among tribal people in New Guinea for the Danish National Museum, and lectured on universities and museums throughout the world, among them Harvard, Yale, Stanford and National Geographic Society in Washington and the Royal Geographical Society in London. He spoke at the international congress of anthropologists in Moscow in 1964.

== Bibliography in Danish ==
- Blandt menneskeædere på Ny Guinea, 1955.
- Kalahari – Atomtidens stenalder, 1958.
- Gensyn med Stenalderen, 1963.
- Endnu lever eventyret, 1971. '
- Forsvundne verdner – 50 år blandt naturfolk , 2005.

== Danish documentaries ==
- Blandt menneskeædere på Ny Guinea
- Fra Cairo til Cap
- Himalaya. Verdens tag
- Kalahari. Afrikas buskmænd
- Atomtidens stenalderfolk. Australiens aboriginals
- På togt med Noona Dan
- Sydhavets glemte folk
- Det nye Kina
- Indiens sjæl

== Sources ==
- Jens Bjerre: Lost Worlds, 2005 (autobiography)
- Portrait at www.gyldendal.dk/jens-bjerre (in Danish)
