= List of city chambers and town halls in Scotland =

This is a list of city chambers and town halls in Scotland. The list is sortable by building age and height, and provides a link to the listing description where relevant. The list, which was compiled using the list of 1,000 Largest Cities and Towns in the UK by Population, published by The Geographist, to ensure completeness, includes over 170 surviving buildings. The oldest town hall is West Wemyss Tolbooth, thought to have been completed in around 1525. The tallest town hall is Greenock Municipal Buildings, whose "Victoria Tower" rises to 245 feet (75 m).

Town or city	Building	Image	Lieutenancy area	Built	Height	Notes
Aberdeen	Aberdeen Town House	More images	Aberdeen	1874		Category A listed (LB19990). Architects: Peddie and Kinnear.
Aberfeldy	Aberfeldy Town Hall	More images	Perth and Kinross	1891		Category B listed (LB20839). Architect: James MacLaren.
Airdrie	Airdrie Town Hall	More images	Lanarkshire	1912		Category B listed (LB20947). Architect: John Thomson.
Airdrie	Airdrie Town House	More images	Lanarkshire	1826	31 metres (102 ft)	Category B listed (LB20926). Architect: Alexander Baird.
Alloa	Alloa Town Hall	More images	Clackmannanshire	1889		Category C listed (LB20976). Architect: Alfred Waterhouse.
Alyth	Alyth Town Hall	More images	Perth and Kinross	1887		Architects: Andrew Heiton and Andrew Granger Heiton.
Annan	Annan Town Hall	More images	Dumfries	1878		Category B listed (LB21097). Architect: Peter Smith.
Anstruther Easter	Anstruther Easter Town Hall	More images	Fife	1872		Category B listed (LB36109). Architect: John Harris.
Anstruther Wester	Anstruther Wester Town Hall	More images	Fife	1795		Category C listed (LB36193).
Arbroath	Arbroath Town House	More images	Angus	1808		Category B listed (LB21172). Architect: David Logan.
Ardrossan	Ardrossan Civic Centre	More images	Ayrshire and Arran	1851		Category B listed (LB21267).
Ardrossan	Old Town Hall, Ardrossan	More images	Ayrshire and Arran	1859		
Auchtermuchty	Auchtermuchty Town House	More images	Fife	1729		Category B listed (LB21372).
Auchterarder	Auchterarder Town Hall	More images	Perth and Kinross	1872		Category C listed (LB21337). Architect: Charles Sandeman Robertson.
Ayr	Ayr Town Hall	More images	Ayrshire and Arran	1830	69 metres (226 ft)	Category A listed (LB21692). Architect: Thomas Hamilton.
Ballater	Ballater Burgh Halls	More images	Aberdeenshire	1896		Category C listed (LB21833). Architects: W. Duguid & Son.
Banchory	Banchory Town Hall	More images	Kincardineshire	1873		Architect: James Thomson.
Banff	Banff Town House	More images	Aberdeenshire	1797		Category A listed (LB22063). Architect: James Reid.
Barrhead	Barrhead Burgh Hall	More images	Renfrewshire	1904		Category C listed (LB22115). Architects: Ninian MacWhannell and John Rogerson.
Beith	Beith Townhouse	More images	Ayrshire and Arran	1817		Category B listed (LB937). Architect: William Dobie.
Bo'ness	Bo'ness Town Hall	More images	Stirling and Falkirk	1904		Category B listed (LB22397). Architects: George Washington Browne.
Brechin	Brechin Town House	More images	Angus	1790		Category B listed (LB22495).
Burntisland	Burntisland Burgh Chambers	More images	Fife	1846		Category B listed (LB22820). Architect: John Henderson.
Campbeltown	Campbeltown Town Hall	More images	Argyll and Bute	1760		Category B listed (LB22918). Architect: John Douglas.
Castle Douglas	Castle Douglas Town Hall	More images	Kirkcudbrightshire	1863		Category B listed (LB22979). Architect: James Barbour.
Cellardyke	Cellardyke Town Hall	More images	Fife	1883		Architects: Henry Hall and Jesse Hall.
Clydebank	Clydebank Town Hall	More images	Dunbartonshire	1902		Category B listed (LB22986). Architect: James Miller.
Coatbridge	Coatbridge Municipal Buildings	More images	Lanarkshire	1894		Category B listed (LB23016). Architect: Alexander McGregor Mitchell.
Coldstream	Coldstream Town Hall	More images	Berwickshire	1863		Category B listed (LB23072). Architect: James Cunningham.
Colinsburgh	Colinsburgh Town Hall	More images	Fife	1895		Architects: Andrew Dewar and Alexander Cumming Dewar.
Coupar Angus	Coupar Angus Town Hall	More images	Perth and Kinross	1887		Category C listed (LB51347). Architect: David Smart.
Cove	Cove Burgh Hall	More images	Argyll and Bute	1893		Category B listed (LB43428). Architect: James Chalmers.
Crail	Crail Tolbooth and Town Hall	More images	Fife	1814		Category A listed (LB23287).
Crieff	Crieff Town Hall	More images	Perth and Kinross	1850		Category B listed (LB23484).
Cromarty	Cromarty Town House	More images	Ross and Cromarty	1773		Category A listed (LB23585).
Crosshill and Govanhill	Crosshill and Govanhill Burgh Hall	More images	Glasgow	1879		Category B listed (LB32427). Architect: Frank Stirrat.
Cullen	Cullen Town Hall	More images	Banffshire	1823		Category B listed (LB23743). Architect: William Robertson.
Culross	Culross Town House	More images	Fife	1626		Category A listed (LB23994).
Cumnock	Cumnock Town Hall	More images	Ayrshire and Arran	1884		Category C listed (LB24119). Architect: Robert Samson Ingram.
Cupar	Cupar Burgh Chambers	More images	Fife	1817		Category B listed (LB24156). Architect: Robert Hutchison.
Dalbeattie	Dalbeattie Town Hall	More images	Kirkcudbrightshire	1862		Category B listed (LB24310).
Dalkeith	Municipal Buildings, Dalkeith	More images	Midlothian	1882		Category B listed (LB24334). Architect: James Pearson Alison.
Dalkeith	Dalkeith Tolbooth	More images	Midlothian	1648		Category B listed (LB24417).
Darvel	Darvel Town Hall	More images	Ayrshire and Arran	1905		Category B listed (LB24493). Architect: Thomas Henry Smith.
Denny	Denny Town House	More images	Stirling and Falkirk	1931		Architect: Robert Wilson.
Dingwall	Dingwall Town Hall	More images	Ross and Cromarty	1745		Category B listed (LB24506). Architect: Mr Downie.
Dumbarton	Dumbarton Burgh Hall	More images	Dunbartonshire	1866		Category A listed (LB24874). Architects: Robert Grieve Melvin and William Leiper.
Dumbarton	Municipal Buildings, Dumbarton	More images	Dunbartonshire	1903		Category B listed (LB24881). Architect: James Thomson.
Dumfries	Municipal Buildings	More images	Dumfries	1932		Category C listed (LB26099). Architect: James Carruthers.
Dumfries	Midsteeple	More images	Dumfries	1707		Category A listed (LB26215). Architect: Tobias Bachop of Alloa.
Dunbar	Dunbar Town House	More images	East Lothian	1593		Category A listed (LB24790).
Dundee	Dundee City Chambers	More images	Dundee	1933		Category B listed (LB25262). Architect: John James Burnet of Glasgow.
Dunfermline	Dunfermline City Chambers	More images	Fife	1879		Category A listed (LB25973). Architect: James Campbell Walker.
Dunoon	Dunoon Burgh Hall	More images	Argyll and Bute	1874		Category B listed (LB26439). Architect: Robert Alexander Bryden.
Dysart	Dysart Tolbooth and Town House	More images	Fife	1576		Category A listed (LB36418).
East Kilbride	East Kilbride Civic Centre	More images	Lanarkshire	1968		Architects: Scott Fraser & Browning.
Edinburgh	Edinburgh City Chambers	More images	Edinburgh	1760		Category A listed (LB17597). Architects: John Adam and John Fergus.
Edzell	Edzell Parish Hall	More images	Angus	1898		Category A listed (LB11261). Architects: Charles and Leslie Ower.
Elie and Earlsferry	Elie and Earlsferry Town Hall	More images	Fife	1873		Category B listed (LB31056). Architect: John Currie.
Elgin	Elgin Town Hall	More images	Moray	1961		Category B listed (LB47391). Architect: William Kininmonth.
Falkirk	Old Municipal Buildings, Falkirk	More images	Stirling and Falkirk	1879		Category C listed (LB31207). Architect: William Black.
Falkland	Falkland Town Hall	More images	Fife	1801		Category A listed (LB31277). Architect: Thomas Barclay.
Forfar	Forfar Town and County Hall	More images	Angus	1788		Category B listed (LB31496). Architect: James Playfair.
Forres	Forres Town Hall	More images	Moray	1829		Category B listed (LB31643). Architect: Archibald Simpson.
Fraserburgh	Fraserburgh Town House	More images	Aberdeenshire	1855		Category B listed (LB31868). Architects: Matthews and MacKenzie.
Galashiels	Galashiels Burgh Chambers	More images	Roxburgh, Ettrick and Lauderdale	1867		Category B listed (LB31977). Architects: Robert Hall & Co. and Sir Robert Lorimer.
Gatehouse of Fleet	Gatehouse of Fleet Town Hall	More images	Kirkcudbrightshire	1885		Architect: James Robart Pearson.
Gifford	Gifford Town Hall	More images	East Lothian	1884		Category B listed (LB14684).
Glasgow	Glasgow City Chambers	More images	Glasgow	1888	73 metres (240 ft)	Category A listed (LB32691). Architect: William Young.
Gourock	Municipal Buildings, Gourock	More images	Renfrewshire	1924		Category C listed (LB34024). Architects: Stewart Tough & Alexander.
Govan, Glasgow	Govan Town Hall	More images	Glasgow	1901		Category B listed (LB33340). Architects: Thomson and Sandilands.
Govan, Glasgow	Govan Municipal Buildings	More images	Glasgow	1867		Category B listed (LB33361). Architect: John Burnet.
Grangemouth	Grangemouth Town Hall	More images	Stirling and Falkirk	1885		Architect: William Black.
Grangemouth	Grangemouth Municipal Buildings	More images	Stirling and Falkirk	1937		Architects: Robert Wilson and David Tait.
Greenlaw	Greenlaw Town Hall	More images	Berwickshire	1831		Category A listed (LB10492). Architect: John Cunningham.
Greenock	Greenock Municipal Buildings	More images	Renfrewshire	1886	75 metres (246 ft)	Category A listed (LB34122). Architects: H & D Barclay.
Haddington	Haddington Town House	More images	East Lothian	1745		Category A listed (LB34185). Architect: William Adam.
Hamilton	Hamilton Townhouse	More images	Lanarkshire	1928		Category B listed (LB34505). Architects: Cullen, Lochhead and Brown.
Hawick	Hawick Town Hall	More images	Roxburgh, Ettrick and Lauderdale	1886		Category A listed (LB34634). Architect: James Campbell Walker.
Helensburgh	Municipal Buildings, Helensburgh	More images	Dunbartonshire	1879		Category B listed (LB34825). Architect: John Honeyman.
Huntly	Huntly Town Hall	More images	Aberdeenshire	1875		Category C listed (LB34914). Architect: James Anderson.
Inverbervie	Inverbervie Town House	More images	Kincardineshire	1840		Category B listed (LB35065).
Invergordon	Invergordon Town Hall	More images	Ross and Cromarty	1871		Category B listed (LB35077). Architect: William Cumming Joass.
Inverkeithing	Inverkeithing Town House	More images	Fife	1770		Category A listed (LB35087). Architect: John and George Monroe.
Inverness	Inverness Town House	More images	Inverness	1882		Category A listed (LB35260). Architect: William Lawrie.
Inverurie	Inverurie Town Hall	More images	Aberdeenshire	1863		Category B listed (LB35399). Architect: John Russell Mackenzie.
Irvine	Irvine Townhouse	More images	Ayrshire and Arran	1862	37 metres (121 ft)	Category B listed (LB35414). Architect: James Ingram.
Jedburgh	Jedburgh Town Hall	More images	Roxburgh, Ettrick and Lauderdale	1900		Category B listed (LB35458). Architect: James Pearson Alison.
Kelso	Kelso Town Hall	More images	Roxburgh, Ettrick and Lauderdale	1816		Category B listed (LB35828). Architect: John Daniel Swanston and William Syme.
Kilbirnie	Kilbirnie Council Offices	More images	Ayrshire and Arran	1916		Architect: Robert James Walker.
Kilmaurs	Kilmaurs Tolbooth	More images	Ayrshire and Arran	1709		Category A listed (LB12588).
Kinghorn	Kinghorn Town Hall	More images	Fife	1830		Category B listed (LB36251). Architect: Thomas Hamilton.
Kingston	Kingston Public Halls	More images	Glasgow	1904		Category B listed (LB33524). Architect: Robert William Horn.
Kinross	Kinross Town Hall	More images	Perth and Kinross	1869		Category B listed (LB36299). Architect: Andrew Cumming.
Kintore	Kintore Town House	More images	Aberdeenshire	1747		Category A listed (LB36312).
Kirkcaldy	Kirkcaldy Town House	More images	Fife	1937–1956		Category B listed (LB36387). Architects: David Carr and William Howard of Edinburgh.
Kirkintilloch	Kirkintilloch Town Hall	More images	Dunbartonshire	1906		Category B listed (LB48641).
Kirkcudbright	Kirkcudbright Tolbooth	More images	Kirkcudbrightshire	1629		Category A listed (LB36542).
Kirkcudbright	Kirkcudbright Town Hall	More images	Kirkcudbrightshire	1881		Category B listed (LB36604). Architects: Peddie and Kinnear.
Kirkwall	Kirkwall Town Hall	More images	Orkney	1886		Category B listed (LB45980). Architect: Thomas Smith Peace.
Kirriemuir	Kirriemuir Town Hall	More images	Angus	1885		Category C listed (LB36916). Architects: Charles and Leslie Ower.
Kirriemuir	Kirriemuir Town House	More images	Angus	1604		Category B listed (LB36812).
Lanark	Lanark Tolbooth	More images	Lanarkshire	1778		Category B listed (LB36997).
Langholm	Langholm Town Hall	More images	Dumfries	1813		Category B listed (LB37122). Architect: William Elliot.
Lauder	Lauder Town Hall	More images	Roxburgh, Ettrick and Lauderdale	1735		Category B listed (LB37201).
Leith	Old Town Hall, Leith	More images	Edinburgh	1829		Category A listed (LB27857). Architects: R & R Dickson
Lerwick	Lerwick Town Hall	More images	Shetland	1883		Category A listed (LB37256). Architect: Alexander Ross.
Linlithgow	Linlithgow Burgh Halls	More images	West Lothian	1670		Category A listed (LB37362). Architect: John Smith.
Lockerbie	Lockerbie Town Hall	More images	Dumfries	1891	35 metres (115 ft)	Category A listed (LB37579). Architects: David Bryce and Frank Carruthers.
Lochmaben	Lochmaben Town Hall	More images	Dumfries	1723		Category A listed (LB37541).
Lossiemouth	Lossiemouth Town Hall	More images	Moray	1885		Architect: Duncan Cameron.
Macduff	Macduff Town Hall	More images	Aberdeenshire	1885		Category B listed (LB37634). Architects: John Bridgeford Pirie and Arthur Clyne.
Maryhill	Maryhill Burgh Halls	More images	Glasgow	1878		Category B listed (LB32349). Architect: Duncan McNaughtan.
Maybole	Maybole Town Hall	More images	Ayrshire and Arran	1887		Category B listed (LB37708). Architect: Robert Samson Ingram.
Millport	Millport Town Hall	More images	Ayrshire and Arran	1878		
Milnathort	Milnathort Town Hall	More images	Perth and Kinross	1855		Category B listed (LB17638). Architect: Mr Watt of Kinross.
Moffat	Moffat Town Hall	More images	Dumfries	1827		Category B listed (LB37927). Architect: Walter Newall.
Montrose	Montrose Town House	More images	Angus	1764		Category A listed (LB38083). Architect: John Hutcheson.
Motherwell	Motherwell Civic Centre	More images	Lanarkshire	1970		Category B listed (LB52545). Architects: Wylie, Shanks and Partners.
Motherwell	Motherwell Town Hall	More images	Lanarkshire	1887	37 metres (121 ft)	Category C listed (LB48305). Architect: John Bennie Wilson.
Musselburgh	Musselburgh Tolbooth	More images	East Lothian	1590		Category A listed (LB38309).
Nairn	Nairn Town and County Buildings	More images	Nairn	1818	24.7 metres (81 ft)	Category B listed (LB38427). Architect: Mr Smith.
Newburgh	Newburgh Town House	More images	Fife	1810		Category B listed (LB38506). Architect: John Speed.
New Cumnock	New Cumnock Town Hall	More images	Ayrshire and Arran	1889		Category C listed (LB50128). Architect: Allan Stevenson.
New Galloway	New Galloway Town Hall	More images	Kirkcudbrightshire	1875		Category B listed (LB38475).
Newton Stewart	Newton Stewart Town Hall	More images	Wigtownshire	1885		Category B listed (LB38669). Architect: Richard Park.
Newton Stewart	Old Town Hall, Newton Stewart	More images	Wigtownshire	1800		Category B listed (LB38686).
North Berwick	North Berwick Town House	More images	East Lothian	1724		Category B listed (LB38731).
Oban	Oban Municipal Buildings	More images	Argyll and Bute	1900		Category B listed (LB38799). Architect: Alexander Shairp.
Old Aberdeen	Old Town House, Old Aberdeen	More images	Aberdeen	1789		Category A listed (LB19992). Architect: George Jaffrey.
Oldmeldrum	Oldmeldrum Town Hall	More images	Aberdeenshire	1877		Category B listed (LB38892). Architect: William Smith.
Paisley	Paisley Town Hall	More images	Renfrewshire	1882		Category A listed (LB38978). Architects: William Henry Lynn of Belfast and William Young.
Partick	Partick Burgh Hall	More images	Glasgow	1872		Category B listed (LB32852). Architect: William Leiper.
Partick	Old Burgh Hall, Partick	More images	Glasgow	1853		Category B listed (LB32845). Architect: Charles Wilson.
Peebles	Peebles Burgh Hall	More images	Tweeddale	1859		Category A listed (LB39180). Architect: John Paris.
Peebles	Peebles Town House	More images	Tweeddale	1753		Category A listed (LB39188).
Penicuik	Penicuik Town Hall	More images	Midlothian	1894		Category C listed (LB46821). Architect: Campbell Douglas.
Perth	Perth City Hall	More images	Perth and Kinross	1914		Category B listed (LB39318). Architects: H E Clifford and Thomas Lunan of Glasgow.
Perth	Municipal Buildings, Perth	More images	Perth and Kinross	1881		Category B listed (LB39320). Architects: Andrew Heiton and Andrew Grainger Heiton.
Peterhead	Peterhead Town House	More images	Aberdeenshire	1788		Category B listed (LB39674). Architect: John Baxter.
Peterhead	Municipal Chambers, Peterhead	More images	Aberdeenshire	1805		Category B listed (LB39694).
Pitlochry	Pitlochry Town Hall	More images	Perth and Kinross	1900		Category B listed (LB47549). Architect: Alexander Ness.
Pittenweem	Pittenween Tolbooth	More images	Fife	1588		Category A listed (LB39868).
Pollokshaws	Pollokshaws Burgh Hall	More images	Glasgow	1898		Category A listed (LB33953). Architect: Robert Rowand Anderson of Edinburgh.
Pollokshields	Pollokshields Burgh Hall	More images	Glasgow	1890		Category A listed (LB33411). Architect: H. E. Clifford.
Port Glasgow	Town Buildings, Port Glasgow	More images	Renfrewshire	1816	46 metres (151 ft)	Category A listed (LB40071). Architect: David Hamilton.
Portobello	Portobello Town Hall	More images	Edinburgh	1914		Category B listed (LB27391). Architect: James Anderson Williamson.
Portobello	Old Town Hall, Portobello	More images	Edinburgh	1878		Category B listed (LB27463). Architect: Robert Paterson.
Portsoy	Old Town Hall, Portsoy	More images	Aberdeenshire	1798		Category C listed (LB40311).
Prestonpans	Prestonpans Town Hall	More images	East Lothian	1897		Category C listed (LB43945). Architect: Peter Whitecross.
Prestwick	Prestwick Burgh Hall	More images	Ayrshire and Arran	1837		Category B listed (LB40329).
Renfrew	Renfrew Town Hall	More images	Renfrewshire	1873	32 metres (105 ft)	Category A listed (LB40430). Architect: James Jamieson Lamb of Paisley.
Rothes	Rothes Town Hall	More images	Moray	1900		Architect: Robert Baillie Pratt.
Rothesay	Rothesay Town Hall and County Buildings	More images	Argyll and Bute	1835		Category B listed (LB40453). Architect: James Dempster.
Rutherglen	Rutherglen Town Hall	More images	Lanarkshire	1862	34 metres (112 ft)	Category A listed (LB33564). Architect: Charles Wilson.
Saltcoats	Saltcoats Town Hall	More images	Ayrshire and Arran	1826		Category B listed (LB40489). Architect: Peter King.
Sanquhar	Sanquhar Tolbooth	More images	Dumfries	1739		Category A listed (LB40540). Architect: William Adam.
Scalloway	Scalloway Public Hall	More images	Shetland	1902		Category C listed (LB47295).
Selkirk	Selkirk Town House	More images	Roxburgh, Ettrick and Lauderdale	1805	30 metres (98 ft)	Category A listed (LB40569). Architect: Robert Lees.
South Queensferry	South Queensferry Tolbooth	More images	Edinburgh	1720		Category B listed (LB40411).
St Andrews	St Andrews Town Hall	More images	Fife	1862		Category B listed (LB40695). Architect: James Anderson Hamilton.
Stirling	Stirling Tolbooth	More images	Stirling and Falkirk	1705		Category A listed (LB41110). Architect: Sir William Bruce.
Stirling	Municipal Buildings, Stirling	More images	Stirling and Falkirk	1918		Category B listed (LB41105). Architect: John Gaff Gillespie.
Stirling	Old Viewforth	More images	Stirling and Falkirk	1855		Category B listed (LB48323). Architect: J W Hay. Extended by James Miller.
Stonehaven	Stonehaven Town Hall	More images	Kincardineshire	1878		Category B listed (LB41534). James Matthews and William Lawrie.
Stonehaven	Stonehaven Town House	More images	Kincardineshire	1790		Category B listed (LB41615).
Stornoway	Stornoway Town Hall	More images	Western Isles	1929		Category B listed (LB41738). Architect: J Robertson. Subsequently rebuilt.
Stow of Wedale	Stow of Wedale Town Hall	More images	Roxburgh, Ettrick and Lauderdale	1857		Category B listed (LB51301).
Stranraer	Old Town Hall, Stranraer	More images	Wigtownshire	1776		Category A listed (LB41745). Architects: Edward Wallace and Thomas Hall.
Strathaven	Old Town Hall, Strathaven	More images	Lanarkshire	1896		Category C listed (LB50142). Architect: Alexander Cullen.
Strathmiglo	Strathmiglo Town House	More images	Fife	1734	21 metres (69 ft)	Category A listed (LB15754).
Strichen	Strichen Town House	More images	Aberdeenshire	1816		Category A listed (LB16551). Architect: John Smith.
Stromness	Old Town Hall, Stromness	More images	Orkney	1858		Category B listed (LB45345).
Tain	Tain Tolbooth	More images	Ross and Cromarty	1708		Category A listed (LB41867). Architect: Alexander Stronach.
Thurso	Thurso Town Hall	More images	Caithness	1871		Category B listed (LB41988). Architect: John Russell Mackenzie.
Troon	Troon Town Hall	More images	Ayrshire and Arran	1932		Category B listed (LB42136). Architect: James Miller.
West Wemyss	West Wemyss Tolbooth	More images	Fife	1525	18 metres (59 ft)	Category B listed (LB16694).
Whiteinch	Whiteinch Burgh Hall	More images	Glasgow	1894		Category B listed (LB50283).
Wick	Wick Town Hall	More images	Caithness	1828		Category B listed (LB42299). Architect: Robert Reid.
Wigtown	Wigtown Town Hall	More images	Wigtownshire	1863		Category B listed (LB42439). Architect: Thomas Brown II.

== See also ==
- List of city and town halls
