= Elie Parish Church =

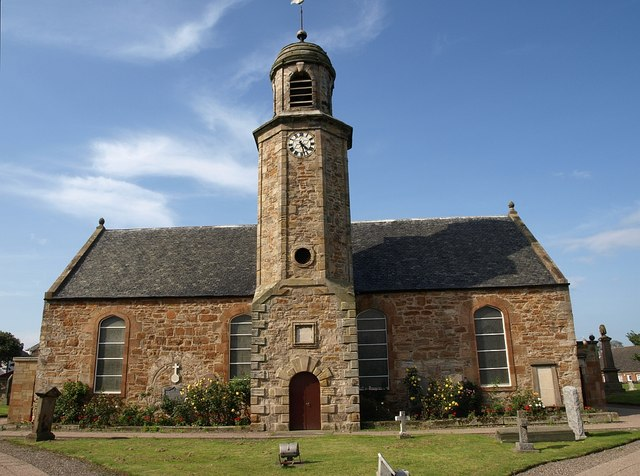
- The church in 2008, looking north from just inside the High Street gates
- Elie Parish Church
- 56°11′27″N 2°49′15″W
- Location: Elie, Fife
- Country: Scotland
- Denomination: Church of Scotland

Architecture
- Architect: William Burn
- Completed: 1831; 195 years ago (1726 clock tower retained)

Elie Parish Church is a church building in Elie, Fife, Scotland. It is Category B listed, its oldest surviving part (the clock tower) dating to the 1726.

An earlier church on the site was built in 1639, the work of William Burn, with the tower following just under a century later. The kirkyard is contemporary with the original church. William Scott, of Ardross, was the benefactor for the 1639 church, while Sir John Anstruther donated the funds for the construction of the tower.

John Currie was responsible for renovations made in 1855. Around fifty years later, Peter MacGregor Chalmers added the east porch, vestry and organ chamber.

== See also ==
- List of listed buildings in Elie and Earlsferry, Fife

== Gallery ==
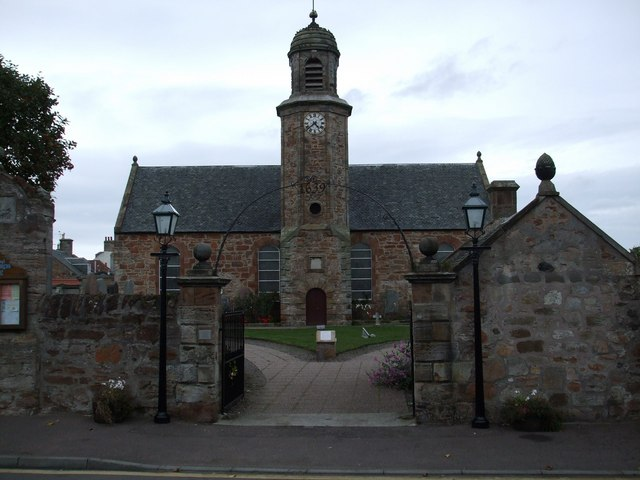
From outside the gates

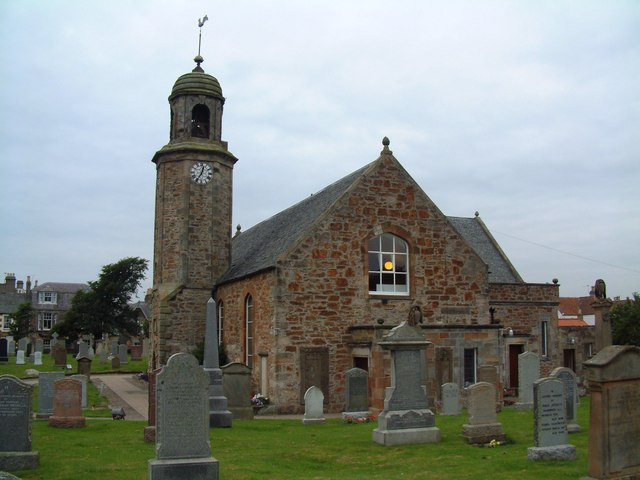
And from the kirkyard
