= David Greig =

David Greig may refer to:

- David Greig (supermarket), a supermarket chain of the Greig family of Hornsey, north London
- David Greig (landowner) (1837–?), Scottish landowner
- David Greig (dramatist) (born 1969), Scottish playwright and theatre director
- David Greig (MP), British member of parliament for Perth, 1839–1841
- David Cunningham Greig (1922–1999), British geologist
- David Middleton Greig (1864–1936), Scottish surgeon
