= List of listed buildings in Elie and Earlsferry, Fife =

This is a list of listed buildings in the parish of Elie and Earlsferry in Fife, Scotland.

== List ==
Name	Location	Date listed	Grid ref. (Note: Sometimes known as OSGB36, the grid reference (where provided) is based on the British national grid reference system used by the Ordnance Survey. • "Guide to National Grid". Ordnance Survey. • "Get-a-map". Ordnance Survey.)	Geo-coordinates	Notes	LB number (Note: Historic Environment Scotland assign a unique alphanumeric identifier to each designated site in Scotland, for listed buildings this always begins with "LB", for example "LB12345".)	Image
The Old Manse High Street				56°11′17″N 2°50′11″W	Category B	31086	Upload another image
Coulter Cottage, Links Road				56°11′23″N 2°50′05″W	Category C(S)	31090	Upload Photo
Elie Parish Churchyard Mural Monument High Street				56°11′26″N 2°49′14″W	Category B	30960	Upload Photo
Elie 22 High Street The Lodge And Offices To Hycroft				56°11′26″N 2°49′04″W	Category B	30966	Upload Photo
Elie 24 High Street Corner Of Stenton Row				56°11′26″N 2°49′04″W	Category C(S)	30967	Upload Photo
Elie 32 34 High Street (Red Cottage)				56°11′25″N 2°49′07″W	Category C(S)	30970	Upload Photo
Elie 36 High Street (Including Garden Walls)				56°11′25″N 2°49′08″W	Category C(S)	30971	Upload Photo
Elie Pilgrim's Way, Liberty				56°11′23″N 2°49′51″W	Category C(S)	30978	Upload Photo
Elie Seaforth Links Place Including Garden Walls				56°11′25″N 2°49′40″W	Category B	30981	Upload Photo
Elie 29 And 31 Park Place				56°11′29″N 2°49′19″W	Category C(S)	30987	Upload Photo
Wynd House Rankeillor Street Garden Walls To Rankeillor Street And High Street				56°11′25″N 2°49′10″W	Category C(S)	31007	Upload Photo
Elie, 7 The Terrace				56°11′23″N 2°49′13″W	Category C(S)	31039	Upload Photo
Elie, 8 The Terrace, Duddingston House				56°11′23″N 2°49′14″W	Category B	31040	Upload Photo
Elie 1-5 The Toft				56°11′21″N 2°49′00″W	Category C(S)	31041	Upload Photo
Chapel Green Lane, Glovers Wynd, Iona House				56°11′13″N 2°50′16″W	Category C(S)	31048	Upload Photo
Earlsferry, 15-17 High Street, Viewforth And Viewforth Cottage				56°11′21″N 2°50′01″W	Category C(S)	31055	Upload Photo
Earlsferry, 57-59 High Street, St Leonards				56°11′18″N 2°50′07″W	Category C(S)	31064	Upload Photo
Earlsferry, 42 High Street, Kenilworth				56°11′19″N 2°50′07″W	Category C(S)	31077	Upload Photo
Elie 13 High Street Rosebank				56°11′28″N 2°49′02″W	Category C(S)	30945	Upload Photo
St Leonard's Cottage High Street				56°11′18″N 2°50′08″W	Category C(S)	31081	Upload Photo
Earlsferry, 76-80 High Street, St John`S And Barclay				56°11′16″N 2°50′12″W	Category C(S)	31087	Upload Photo
Earlsferry Ravenscraig, Links Road				56°11′23″N 2°50′05″W	Category C(S)	31089	Upload Photo
Elie 2 High Street				56°11′28″N 2°48′57″W	Category C(S)	30961	Upload Photo
Elie Rosemary 12 High Street				56°11′27″N 2°49′00″W	Category B	30964	Upload Photo
Elie Marionville Links Place				56°11′27″N 2°49′39″W	Category B	30980	Upload Photo
Elie 3 Park Place				56°11′26″N 2°49′18″W	Category C(S)	30982	Upload Photo
Elie 5-17 (Odd Nos) Park Place				56°11′27″N 2°49′18″W	Category C(S)	30983	Upload Photo
Elie Elmbank 41 Park Place				56°11′31″N 2°49′20″W	Category C(S)	30990	Upload Photo
Elie Beechwood 43 Park Place				56°11′32″N 2°49′20″W	Category C(S)	30991	Upload Photo
Elie 4 Park Place				56°11′28″N 2°49′17″W	Category C(S)	30994	Upload Photo
9 Rankeillor Street				56°11′24″N 2°49′11″W	Category B	31003	Upload Photo
Elie 5 South Street				56°11′23″N 2°49′17″W	Category C(S)	31015	Upload Photo
Sunnybank South Street				56°11′24″N 2°49′27″W	Category C(S)	31024	Upload Photo
Elie 10 Stenton Row Stenton House				56°11′25″N 2°49′04″W	Category C(S)	31035	Upload Photo
Earlsferry, Chapel Green, Earlsneuk				56°11′05″N 2°50′21″W	Category C(S)	31047	Upload Photo
Ivy Cottage, Ferry Road				56°11′23″N 2°50′00″W	Category C(S)	31051	Upload Photo
Earlsferry, 4 High Street, The Riggings				56°11′22″N 2°50′01″W	Category C(S)	31069	Upload Photo
Earlsferry, 18-20 High Street				56°11′21″N 2°50′03″W	Category C(S)	31072	Upload Photo
Earlsferry Nelson Cottage High Street				56°11′19″N 2°50′07″W	Category C(S)	31078	Upload Photo
Elie 7 Bank Street Rose Cottage				56°11′26″N 2°49′20″W	Category B	30924	Upload Photo
1-13 Golf Court, Bank Street (Excluding Modern North-West Extension)				56°11′27″N 2°49′26″W	Category B	30928	Upload Photo
Elie 10 Bank Street				56°11′25″N 2°49′19″W	Category C(S)	30931	Upload Photo
Elie 14 Bank Street Greenbank				56°11′26″N 2°49′22″W	Category C(S)	30933	Upload Photo
7 High Street				56°11′29″N 2°48′59″W	Category B	30942	Upload Photo
Aldersyde High Street				56°11′19″N 2°50′07″W	Category C(S)	31079	Upload Photo
Ardwell High Street				56°11′17″N 2°50′10″W	Category C(S)	31085	Upload Photo
Earlsferry, 86 High Street, Orcadia				56°11′15″N 2°50′13″W	Category B	31088	Upload Photo
Elie 4 High Street Elie Estate Office				56°11′28″N 2°48′58″W	Category C(S)	30962	Upload Photo
Elie Kingscroft 18 High Street				56°11′27″N 2°49′01″W	Category C(S)	30965	Upload Photo
Elie 52-56 High Street				56°11′25″N 2°49′16″W	Category C(S)	30975	Upload Photo
Elie, 21 And 23 (Auldstanes) Park Place				56°11′28″N 2°49′19″W	Category C(S)	30985	Upload Photo
Elie 33-37 Park Place				56°11′30″N 2°49′19″W	Category B	30988	Upload Photo
Elie, The Elms, 12 Park Place				56°11′30″N 2°49′17″W	Category C(S)	30998	Upload Photo
7 Rankeillor Street				56°11′24″N 2°49′11″W	Category C(S)	31002	Upload Photo
Elie Wynd Lodge, Rankeillor Street				56°11′24″N 2°49′11″W	Category B	31004	Upload Photo
Tigh-Na-Mara. Rankeillor Street. & 5 The Terrace				56°11′23″N 2°49′12″W	Category C(S)	31005	Upload Photo
Elie Easter Gables And Seven Gables 2 South Street				56°11′22″N 2°49′15″W	Category B	31027	Upload Photo
Fairhaven				56°11′23″N 2°49′24″W	Category C(S)	31031	Upload Photo
Elie 8 Stenton Row Belvedere				56°11′25″N 2°49′04″W	Category C(S)	31034	Upload Photo
Elie, 6 The Terrace, Garden House				56°11′23″N 2°49′12″W	Category B	31038	Upload Photo
Elie Eastfield The Toft				56°11′20″N 2°48′59″W	Category B	31042	Upload Photo
Elie Seafield Bank The Toft				56°11′20″N 2°48′58″W	Category B	31043	Upload Photo
Elie Belhaven, Williamsburgh				56°11′23″N 2°49′54″W	Category C(S)	31045	Upload Photo
Earlsferry, 37 High Street, Rosemount And Roseneath				56°11′20″N 2°50′05″W	Category C(S)	31061	Upload Photo
Earlsferry, 71 High Street, Earlslea				56°11′15″N 2°50′11″W	Category C(S)	31067	Upload Photo
Earlsferry, 8 High Street, The Cross				56°11′22″N 2°50′02″W	Category C(S)	31070	Upload Photo
Elie 1 And 3 Bank Street And 1 Park Place				56°11′26″N 2°49′18″W	Category B	30922	Upload Photo
Elie Harbour				56°11′11″N 2°49′08″W	Category B	30937	Upload Photo
3 High Street				56°11′29″N 2°48′58″W	Category C(S)	30940	Upload Photo
5 High Street				56°11′29″N 2°48′59″W	Category C(S)	30941	Upload Photo
Elie 39 High Street				56°11′26″N 2°49′08″W	Category C(S)	30952	Upload Photo
Elie 41-47 Odd Nos. High Street				56°11′27″N 2°49′09″W	Category C(S)	30953	Upload Photo
Elie Clydesdale Bank 57 High Street/The Vennel				56°11′26″N 2°49′12″W	Category C(S)	30957	Upload Photo
Elie Parish Church, Gateway, Churchyard Wall, And Former Session House Now Public Shelter. High Street				56°11′26″N 2°49′15″W	Category B	30959	Upload Photo
Elie, Liberty House, Liberty				56°11′26″N 2°49′44″W	Category C(S)	30976	Upload Photo
Elie Primary School, Park Place (North Block Only)				56°11′33″N 2°49′21″W	Category C(S)	30992	Upload another image
Elie 6 Park Place				56°11′28″N 2°49′17″W	Category C(S)	30995	Upload Photo
Elie 8 Park Place				56°11′29″N 2°49′17″W	Category C(S)	30996	Upload Photo
Elie 5 Rankeillor Street				56°11′25″N 2°49′11″W	Category C(S)	31001	Upload Photo
1 South Street				56°11′23″N 2°49′14″W	Category C(S)	31013	Upload Photo
3 South Street				56°11′23″N 2°49′15″W	Category C(S)	31014	Upload Photo
The Blue House South Street				56°11′24″N 2°49′26″W	Category C(S)	31023	Upload Photo
Elie The Castle South Street				56°11′22″N 2°49′19″W	Category A	31029	Upload Photo
Elie 2, 4 Stenton Row				56°11′26″N 2°49′04″W	Category C(S)	31032	Upload Photo
Elie Archibald House 1 The Terrace				56°11′23″N 2°49′05″W	Category B	31036	Upload Photo
Earlsferry Ferry Lodge, Ferry Road Corner Off High Street				56°11′23″N 2°50′00″W	Category C(S)	31050	Upload Photo
Earlsferry, 19-21 High Street, Town Hall				56°11′20″N 2°50′02″W	Category B	31056	Upload another image
Earlsferry, 29 High Street				56°11′20″N 2°50′03″W	Category C(S)	31058	Upload Photo
Earlsferry, 33-35 High Street, The Gable				56°11′20″N 2°50′03″W	Category C(S)	31060	Upload Photo
Earlsferry, 55 High Street, Corbie				56°11′18″N 2°50′07″W	Category B	31063	Upload Photo
Earlsferry, 28-30 High Street, Ardsheiling				56°11′20″N 2°50′06″W	Category C(S)	31076	Upload Photo
Elie 9 Bank Street				56°11′26″N 2°49′22″W	Category C(S)	30925	Upload Photo
Elie Royal Bank Of Scotland Bank Street				56°11′26″N 2°49′22″W	Category C(S)	30927	Upload Photo
Elie 1 High Street				56°11′29″N 2°48′58″W	Category C(S)	30939	Upload Photo
Elie Marigold 9 High Street				56°11′28″N 2°49′00″W	Category C(S)	30943	Upload Photo
Elie 11 High Street, Brendon				56°11′28″N 2°49′01″W	Category C(S)	30944	Upload Photo
Elie 51, 51A High Street				56°11′26″N 2°49′10″W	Category C(S)	30954	Upload Photo
Earlsferry Ritchie Cottage Links Road				56°11′18″N 2°50′13″W	Category C(S)	31092	Upload Photo
Elie Newhaven 6, 8 High Street				56°11′28″N 2°48′59″W	Category C(S)	30963	Upload Photo
Elie 42, 50 High Street				56°11′25″N 2°49′14″W	Category C(S)	30974	Upload Photo
Elie Fernbank, Liberty Including Fernbank Cottage				56°11′25″N 2°49′51″W	Category C(S)	30977	Upload Photo
Elie 19 Park Place				56°11′28″N 2°49′19″W	Category C(S)	30984	Upload Photo
Elie 39 Park Place				56°11′31″N 2°49′20″W	Category B	30989	Upload Photo
Elie Sea Wynd 10 School Wynd				56°11′24″N 2°49′18″W	Category B	31012	Upload Photo
26 South Street				56°11′23″N 2°49′21″W	Category B	31020	Upload Photo
Elie West House South Street				56°11′24″N 2°49′29″W	Category B	31026	Upload Photo
6 Stenton Row Stenton Cottage				56°11′26″N 2°49′04″W	Category C(S)	31033	Upload Photo
Elie Dairg, Williamsburgh (Corner Of Rotten Row)				56°11′24″N 2°49′54″W	Category C(S)	31044	Upload Photo
Earlsferry, 31 High Street				56°11′20″N 2°50′03″W	Category C(S)	31059	Upload Photo
Earlsferry, Turret Lodge, 67 High Street				56°11′16″N 2°50′10″W	Category B	31066	Upload Photo
Earlsferry, 24 High Street, Two Ways				56°11′20″N 2°50′05″W	Category B	31074	Upload Photo
Elie 11 Bank Street				56°11′26″N 2°49′22″W	Category C(S)	30926	Upload Photo
Elie 16 Bank Street				56°11′25″N 2°49′22″W	Category C(S)	30934	Upload Photo
Elie 3, 5, 7 (Singa) 9 Chapmans Place				56°11′27″N 2°49′05″W	Category C(S)	30936	Upload Photo
21 High Street				56°11′27″N 2°49′04″W	Category B	30947	Upload Photo
Elie, Former Queens Hotel, 31A-F And 33 High Street And 2A-G Chapmans Place, Including Mayview, Chapmans Place				56°11′27″N 2°49′05″W	Category C(S)	30949	Upload Photo
Stair House High Street				56°11′19″N 2°50′07″W	Category B	31080	Upload Photo
Earlsferry Fairlawn And Devon Cottage High Street				56°11′18″N 2°50′09″W	Category C(S)	31083	Upload Photo
The Auld Hoose High Street				56°11′18″N 2°50′09″W	Category C(S)	31084	Upload Photo
Elie Parish Church Manse Off High Street				56°11′24″N 2°49′06″W	Category C(S)	30969	Upload Photo
Elie Toll Green, Off High Street, (Including Garden Walls)				56°11′25″N 2°49′08″W	Category C(S)	30972	Upload Photo
Elie 38, 40 High Street				56°11′25″N 2°49′11″W	Category C(S)	30973	Upload Photo
Elie Baldionie 10 Park Place				56°11′29″N 2°49′17″W	Category B	30997	Upload Photo
Elie 3 Rankeillor Street Toll Green House				56°11′25″N 2°49′11″W	Category C(S)	31000	Upload Photo
Elie Wynd House, Rankeillor Street				56°11′24″N 2°49′10″W	Category B	31006	Upload Photo
Elie 2 School Wynd				56°11′25″N 2°49′18″W	Category C(S)	31008	Upload Photo
11 South Street Corner Of School Wynd				56°11′23″N 2°49′18″W	Category C(S)	31016	Upload Photo
Elie 19 South Street				56°11′23″N 2°49′20″W	Category B	31018	Upload Photo
27 South Street				56°11′23″N 2°49′22″W	Category C(S)	31021	Upload Photo
Elie Seafort 4 South Street				56°11′22″N 2°49′15″W	Category B	31028	Upload Photo
12, 14, 16, 18 South Street				56°11′23″N 2°49′22″W	Category B	31030	Upload Photo
Elie Braehead 4 The Terrace				56°11′24″N 2°49′08″W	Category C(S)	31037	Upload Photo
Elie White House, Williamsburgh				56°11′23″N 2°49′55″W	Category C(S)	31046	Upload Photo
Earlsferry, 63 High Street, Rose Cottage				56°11′17″N 2°50′08″W	Category C(S)	31065	Upload Photo
Earlsferry, 81 High Street (Off), Sandford				56°11′14″N 2°50′11″W	Category C(S)	31068	Upload Photo
Earlsferry, 12 High Street, Gowanlea				56°11′21″N 2°50′03″W	Category C(S)	31071	Upload Photo
Earlsferry, 22 High Street, Ferry Cottage				56°11′21″N 2°50′04″W	Category C(S)	31073	Upload Photo
Elie 5 Bank Street				56°11′26″N 2°49′19″W	Category C(S)	30923	Upload Photo
Elie 6, 8 Bonnington Bank Street				56°11′25″N 2°49′19″W	Category C(S)	30930	Upload Photo
Elie Harbour Warehouse				56°11′11″N 2°49′11″W	Category B	30938	Upload Photo
Elie 35, 35A High Street				56°11′26″N 2°49′07″W	Category C(S)	30950	Upload Photo
Elie 37 High Street Homestead				56°11′27″N 2°49′08″W	Category C(S)	30951	Upload Photo
Earlsferry Summerlea Cottage, Links Road				56°11′20″N 2°50′09″W	Category C(S)	31091	Upload Photo
Elie Parish Church High Street				56°11′27″N 2°49′15″W	Category B	30958	Upload another image
Elie 26-30 High Street				56°11′25″N 2°49′05″W	Category C(S)	30968	Upload Photo
Elie, 25 Park Place, Hopwood				56°11′29″N 2°49′19″W	Category C(S)	30986	Upload Photo
Elie 2 Park Place				56°11′27″N 2°49′17″W	Category C(S)	30993	Upload Photo
Mid-Brae 6 School Wynd				56°11′24″N 2°49′18″W	Category C(S)	31010	Upload Photo
Earlsferry, 5 High Street, Winston Cottage				56°11′22″N 2°50′00″W	Category C(S)	31054	Upload Photo
Earlsferry, 26 High Street, Ashdene				56°11′20″N 2°50′05″W	Category C(S)	31075	Upload Photo
Elie 2, 4 Bank Street Corner Of School Wynd				56°11′25″N 2°49′18″W	Category C(S)	30929	Upload Photo
Elie 23, 25 High Street And 1 Chapmans Place				56°11′27″N 2°49′04″W	Category C(S)	30948	Upload Photo
Elie 53 High Street				56°11′26″N 2°49′11″W	Category C(S)	30955	Upload Photo
Elie 55 And 57 High Street St Ann's				56°11′26″N 2°49′11″W	Category C(S)	30956	Upload Photo
Craigallen High Street				56°11′18″N 2°50′08″W	Category C(S)	31082	Upload Photo
Elie Dunreggan House Park Place				56°11′33″N 2°49′18″W	Category B	30999	Upload Photo
The Haven 4 School Wynd				56°11′24″N 2°49′18″W	Category C(S)	31009	Upload Photo
8 School Wynd				56°11′24″N 2°49′18″W	Category C(S)	31011	Upload Photo
Elie 17 South Street				56°11′23″N 2°49′20″W	Category C(S)	31017	Upload Photo
Elie 23-25 South Street				56°11′23″N 2°49′21″W	Category B	31019	Upload Photo
Allanton South Street				56°11′23″N 2°49′23″W	Category C(S)	31022	Upload Photo
Sunnyside South Street				56°11′24″N 2°49′27″W	Category C(S)	31025	Upload Photo
Earlsferry, 1 High Street, Earls Lodge				56°11′22″N 2°49′59″W	Category C(S)	31052	Upload Photo
Earlsferry, 3 High Street, Waverley				56°11′22″N 2°50′00″W	Category C(S)	31053	Upload Photo
Earlsferry, 19 And 25 High Street, Torpend And Morriston				56°11′21″N 2°50′02″W	Category C(S)	31057	Upload Photo
Earlsferry, 39 High Street, Strathneuk				56°11′19″N 2°50′05″W	Category C(S)	31062	Upload Photo
Elie 12 Bank Street				56°11′25″N 2°49′21″W	Category C(S)	30932	Upload Photo
Elie 18 Bank Street				56°11′26″N 2°49′23″W	Category C(S)	30935	Upload Photo
Elie 19 High Street				56°11′28″N 2°49′04″W	Category C(S)	30946	Upload Photo
Elie, Toll Green, Drinking Fountain				56°11′26″N 2°49′05″W	Category C(S)	51952	Upload another image
Elie, Rotten Row, St Michael and All Angels Episcopal Church				56°11′25″N 2°49′57″W	Category C(S)	51964	Upload another image

== Key ==
The scheme for classifying buildings in Scotland is:

- Category A: "buildings of national or international importance, either architectural or historic; or fine, little-altered examples of some particular period, style or building type."
- Category B: "buildings of regional or more than local importance; or major examples of some particular period, style or building type, which may have been altered."
- Category C: "buildings of local importance; lesser examples of any period, style, or building type, as originally constructed or moderately altered; and simple traditional buildings which group well with other listed buildings."

In March 2016 there were 47,288 listed buildings in Scotland. Of these, 8% were Category A, and 50% were Category B, with the remaining 42% being Category C.

== See also ==
- List of listed buildings in Fife
