= Crail market cross =

Scottish memorial cross

- Crail mercat cross
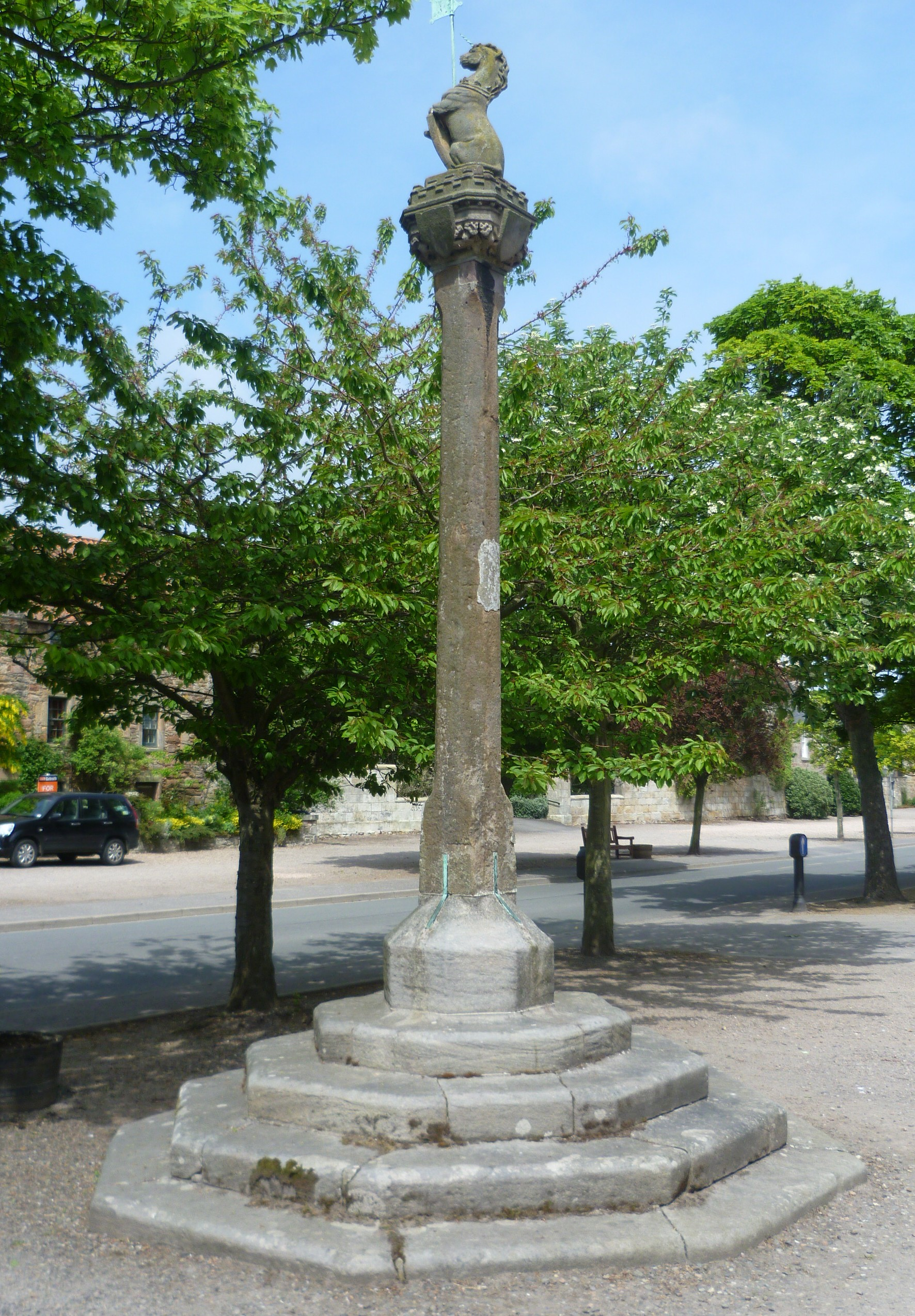
- The mercat cross in 2013

- Location within Fife Location within Scotland
- 56.055624°N 3.62836°W
- Location: The Cross, Crail, Fife, Scotland

History
- Built: early 17th century

Crail market cross is located in Crail, Fife, Scotland. Erected in the early 17th century and now Category B listed, it is a mercat cross with a square chamfered shaft set on a stepped base. It has a capital and unicorn finial, added in 1887 by Fife architect John Currie.

The cross stands just to the north of Crail Tolbooth and Town Hall.

It was formerly a scheduled monument between 1962 and 2016.

== Gallery ==
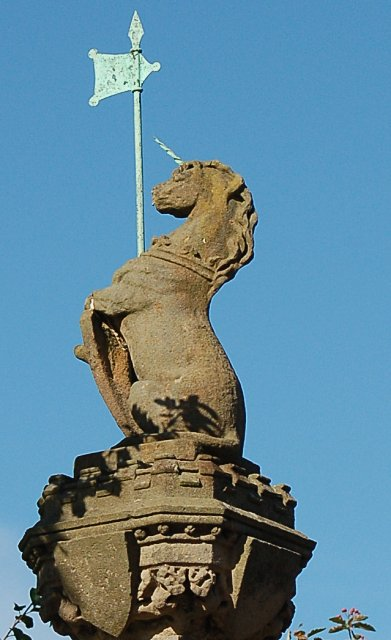
Finial detail

== See also ==
- Mercat cross
