= List of listed buildings in Ardrossan, North Ayrshire =

This is a list of listed buildings in the parish of Ardrossan in North Ayrshire, Scotland.

== List ==
Name	Location	Date Listed	Grid Ref. (Note: Sometimes known as OSGB36, the grid reference (where provided) is based on the British national grid reference system used by the Ordnance Survey. • "Guide to National Grid". Ordnance Survey. • "Get-a-map". Ordnance Survey.)	Geo-coordinates	Notes	LB Number (Note: Historic Environment Scotland assign a unique alphanumeric identifier to each designated site in Scotland, for listed buildings this always begins with "LB", for example "LB12345".)	Image
56, Eglinton Road				55°38′59″N 4°48′44″W	Category B	21331	Upload Photo
Dalry Road, Mill Farm				55°39′42″N 4°48′22″W	Category C(S)	21334	Upload Photo
St Peter-in-Chains RC Church Pavilion Place and South Crescent				55°38′27″N 4°48′33″W	Category A	21335	Upload another image
26, South Crescent Road, former St Andrew's Rectory				55°38′23″N 4°47′55″W	Category B	21261	Upload another image
6 Arran Place				55°38′23″N 4°48′38″W	Category B	21271	Upload Photo
4 South Crescent Road				55°38′27″N 4°48′27″W	Category B	21278	Upload Photo
Harbour Street Nichols Bar				55°38′22″N 4°48′55″W	Category B	21309	Upload Photo
86, 88 Glasgow Street				55°38′31″N 4°48′46″W	Category B	21321	Upload Photo
94, 96 Glasgow Street				55°38′32″N 4°48′46″W	Category B	21323	Upload Photo
Eglinton Road Seafield (Now School)				55°39′08″N 4°49′00″W	Category B	21328	Upload Photo
Seafield Eglinton Road. Stables				55°39′09″N 4°49′04″W	Category B	21329	Upload Photo
St Andrew's Episcopal Church, South Crescent Road				55°38′23″N 4°47′53″W	Category B	21260	Upload Photo
Ardrossan Castle				55°38′31″N 4°48′36″W	Now scheduled monument SM3383	21266	Upload another image
2 South Crescent Road				55°38′26″N 4°48′31″W	Category C(S)	21276	Upload Photo
3 South Crescent Road				55°38′27″N 4°48′29″W	Category C(S)	21277	Upload Photo
5 South Crescent Road				55°38′27″N 4°48′25″W	Category B	21279	Upload Photo
Bath Villa (No 90 Princes Street)				55°38′20″N 4°48′41″W	Category B	21288	Upload Photo
30, 32 Glasgow Street				55°38′27″N 4°48′51″W	Category B	21312	Upload Photo
Montfode Castle				55°39′30″N 4°49′17″W	Now scheduled monument SM5816	105	Upload another image
Winton Primary School Anderson Terrace				55°38′40″N 4°48′25″W	Category C(S)	21333	Upload Photo
Town Hall Glasgow Street				55°38′35″N 4°48′41″W	Category B	21267	Upload another image
1 Arran Place				55°38′23″N 4°48′39″W	Category C(S)	21268	Upload Photo
7 Arran Place				55°38′24″N 4°48′38″W	Category B	21272	Upload Photo
8 South Crescent Road				55°38′27″N 4°48′20″W	Category B	21282	Upload Photo
69 Princes Street, Ardrossan Celtic Supporters Club				55°38′23″N 4°48′49″W	Category B	21297	Upload Photo
93 Princes Street Royal Bank Of Scotland				55°38′22″N 4°48′43″W	Category B	21299	Upload Photo
46, 48 Princes Street				55°38′23″N 4°48′53″W	Category B	21301	Upload Photo
56, 58 Princes Street				55°38′23″N 4°48′51″W	Category B	21303	Upload Photo
78 Princes Street The Clyde Estuary Hotel				55°38′22″N 4°48′48″W	Category B	21308	Upload Photo
Harbour Street Winton Buildings, R L Alpine And Co, C L Crawford Ardplas Rainwear Direct Supply Company				55°38′21″N 4°48′58″W	Category C(S)	21310	Upload Photo
48, 50, 52 Glasgow Street				55°38′28″N 4°48′49″W	Category B	21317	Upload Photo
90, 92 Glasgow Street				55°38′32″N 4°48′46″W	Category B	21322	Upload Photo
Ardrossan Harbour Old Power House,				55°38′23″N 4°49′04″W	Category B	21327	Upload Photo
Kirkhill Burial Ground				55°39′08″N 4°48′04″W	Category C(S)	21332	Upload Photo
Barony Church Of Scotland, Arran Place				55°38′22″N 4°48′40″W	Category B	21259	Upload another image
2, 3, Arran Place				55°38′23″N 4°48′39″W	Category B	21269	Upload Photo
10 Arran Place				55°38′25″N 4°48′37″W	Category B	21275	Upload Photo
12 Crescent Road				55°38′26″N 4°48′13″W	Category C(S)	21285	Upload Photo
89, 91 Princes Street				55°38′22″N 4°48′44″W	Category B	21298	Upload Photo
60, 62, 64, 66 Princes Street				55°38′23″N 4°48′51″W	Category B	21304	Upload Photo
72 Princes Street				55°38′22″N 4°48′49″W	Category B	21306	Upload Photo
74, 76 Princes Street				55°38′22″N 4°48′49″W	Category B	21307	Upload Photo
96, 98, 100 Glasgow Street				55°38′32″N 4°48′45″W	Category B	21324	Upload Photo
3 Dock Road (Hm Customs And Excise House)				55°38′22″N 4°49′01″W	Category B	21326	Upload Photo
4, 5 Arran Place				55°38′23″N 4°48′38″W	Category B	21270	Upload Photo
6 South Crescent Road				55°38′28″N 4°48′24″W	Category B	21280	Upload Photo
63, 65, 67 Princes Street				55°38′24″N 4°48′50″W	Category B	21295	Upload Photo
59, 61 Princes Street, Lyric Bingo				55°38′24″N 4°48′50″W	Category B	21296	Upload Photo
Glasgow Street. Church Of The Nazarine Evangelical				55°38′37″N 4°48′39″W	Category C(S)	21325	Upload another image
Seafield. Eglinton Road. Gatepiers and retaining Railings and Piers				55°39′08″N 4°49′00″W	Category B	21330	Upload Photo
7 South Crescent Road, South Beach House				55°38′28″N 4°48′22″W	Category B	21281	Upload Photo
11 South Crescent Road Hotel Kilmeny				55°38′26″N 4°48′15″W	Category C(S)	21284	Upload Photo
44 Princes Street With 1-5 Harbour Street				55°38′23″N 4°48′54″W	Category B	21300	Upload Photo
50, 54 Princes Street				55°38′23″N 4°48′52″W	Category B	21302	Upload Photo
Harbour Street Old Constabulary				55°38′22″N 4°48′57″W	Category C(S)	21311	Upload Photo
46, 46A Glasgow Street				55°38′28″N 4°48′50″W	Category B	21316	Upload Photo
66, 68 Glasgow Street				55°38′29″N 4°48′49″W	Category B	21319	Upload Photo
St Peter's School, South Crescent Road				55°38′23″N 4°47′58″W	Category C(S)	21262	Upload Photo
9, 10 South Crescent Road St Theresa's House				55°38′27″N 4°48′18″W	Category C(S)	21283	Upload Photo
13 South Crescent Road				55°38′26″N 4°48′10″W	Category C(S)	21286	Upload Photo
14 South Crescent Road				55°38′26″N 4°48′09″W	Category B	21287	Upload Photo
10 Princes Street				55°38′24″N 4°48′56″W	Category B	21290	Upload Photo
EU Congregational Church Princes Street				55°38′31″N 4°48′50″W	Category C(S)	21291	Upload another image
41, 43, 45 Princes St				55°38′25″N 4°48′53″W	Category B	21292	Upload Photo
38, 40 Glasgow Street				55°38′27″N 4°48′50″W	Category B	21314	Upload Photo
Obelisk, Castle Hill				55°38′29″N 4°48′42″W	Category B	21264	Upload Photo
Old Burial Ground, Castle Hill				55°38′35″N 4°48′34″W	Category B	21265	Upload another image
8 Arran Place				55°38′24″N 4°48′37″W	Category B	21273	Upload Photo
9 Arran Place				55°38′24″N 4°48′37″W	Category B	21274	Upload Photo
47, 49, 51 Princes Street				55°38′24″N 4°48′52″W	Category B	21293	Upload Photo
53, 55, 57 Princes Street				55°38′24″N 4°48′51″W	Category B	21294	Upload Photo
68, 70 Princes Street				55°38′22″N 4°48′50″W	Category B	21305	Upload Photo
34, 36 Glasgow Street				55°38′27″N 4°48′51″W	Category B	21313	Upload Photo
42, 44 Glasgow Street				55°38′27″N 4°48′50″W	Category B	21315	Upload Photo
54, 56 Glasgow Street				55°38′28″N 4°48′49″W	Category B	21318	Upload Photo
70, 72 Glasgow Street				55°38′29″N 4°48′48″W	Category B	21320	Upload Photo
Montefode Farmhouse And Courtyard				55°39′33″N 4°49′14″W	Category C(S)	1061	Upload Photo

== Key ==
The scheme for classifying buildings in Scotland is:

- Category A: "buildings of national or international importance, either architectural or historic; or fine, little-altered examples of some particular period, style or building type."
- Category B: "buildings of regional or more than local importance; or major examples of some particular period, style or building type, which may have been altered."
- Category C: "buildings of local importance; lesser examples of any period, style, or building type, as originally constructed or moderately altered; and simple traditional buildings which group well with other listed buildings."

In March 2016 there were 47,288 listed buildings in Scotland. Of these, 8% were Category A, and 50% were Category B, with the remaining 42% being Category C.

== See also ==
- List of listed buildings in North Ayrshire
- Scheduled monuments in North Ayrshire
