= Elie Primary School =

Building in Scotland

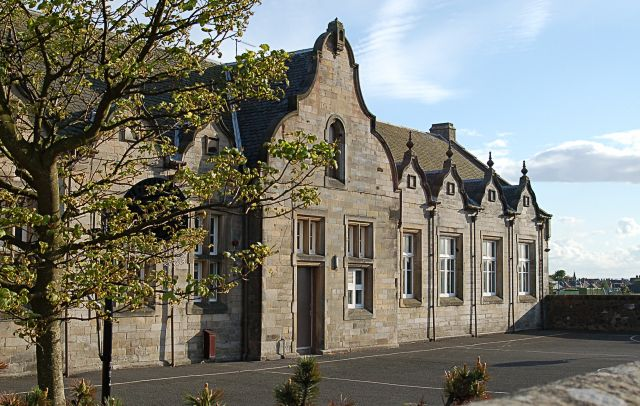
- The original school block in 2007
- Interactive map of the Elie Primary School area

General information
- Location: Park Place, Elie, Fife, Scotland
- Coordinates: 56.192611°N 2.822430°W
- Completed: 1858 (168 years ago)

Technical details
- Floor count: 1 (plus attic)

Design and construction
- Architect: John Currie (north block)

Website
- https://www.fife.gov.uk/facilities/primary-school/elie-primary-school

Elie Primary School is a school in Elie, Fife, Scotland. It is located partly in a Category C listed building dating from 1858. The architect of the relevant north block was Elie native John Currie.

== See also ==
- List of listed buildings in Elie and Earlsferry, Fife
