= List of listed buildings in Ballater =

This is a list of listed buildings in the parish of Ballater in Aberdeenshire, Scotland.

== List ==
Name	Location	Date Listed	Grid Ref. (Note: Sometimes known as OSGB36, the grid reference (where provided) is based on the British national grid reference system used by the Ordnance Survey. • "Guide to National Grid". Ordnance Survey. • "Get-a-map". Ordnance Survey.)	Geo-coordinates	Notes	LB Number (Note: Historic Environment Scotland assign a unique alphanumeric identifier to each designated site in Scotland, for listed buildings this always begins with "LB", for example "LB12345".)	Image
Deebank Road, Riverston				57°02′49″N 3°02′21″W	Category C(S)	21846	Upload Photo
1 And 3 Bridge Street And 2 Deebank Road				57°02′51″N 3°02′18″W	Category C(S)	21849	Upload Photo
Old Line Road, Sluievannachie Including Cheese Press And Boundary Wall				57°03′00″N 3°03′13″W	Category B	21852	Upload Photo
Braemar Road, St Kentigern's Church (Scottish Episcopal) Including Walls				57°03′02″N 3°02′34″W	Category C(S)	21830	Upload Photo
Station Square, Albert Memorial And Victoria Halls And Gordon Institute				57°02′59″N 3°02′25″W	Category C(S)	21833	Upload another image
36 Braemar Road, Craigendarroch House And Boundary Wall				57°03′05″N 3°02′46″W	Category C(S)	50642	Upload Photo
44 Braemar Road, Aspen Lodge Summerhouse				57°03′05″N 3°02′58″W	Category C(S)	50644	Upload Photo
Church Square, Commemorative Drinking Well				57°02′56″N 3°02′22″W	Category C(S)	50647	Upload Photo
11 Bridge Square, Inverdeen House				57°02′51″N 3°02′17″W	Category C(S)	21839	Upload Photo
Deebank Road, Inchley				57°02′50″N 3°02′20″W	Category B	21847	Upload Photo
50 Braemar Road, The Old Coach House, The Neuk, Hillcrest And Including Boundary Wall				57°03′03″N 3°03′03″W	Category C(S)	49294	Upload Photo
42 Braemar Road, Glenbardie Guest House Including Ancillary Structure And Boundary Wall				57°03′04″N 3°02′53″W	Category C(S)	50643	Upload Photo
2 And 4 Church Square				57°02′55″N 3°02′28″W	Category C(S)	50648	Upload Photo
Victoria Road, Pavilion				57°02′53″N 3°02′27″W	Category C(S)	50651	Upload Photo
Station Square, Former Ballater Railway Station Including Platform				57°03′00″N 3°02′26″W	Category B	21854	Upload Photo
Church Square, Glenmuick Parish Church, (Church Of Scotland)				57°02′55″N 3°02′25″W	Category B	21828	Upload another image
5 And 7 Victoria Road				57°02′54″N 3°02′22″W	Category C(S)	50652	Upload Photo
10 Bridge Square				57°02′51″N 3°02′16″W	Category C(S)	21838	Upload Photo
Deebank Road, 9 Deebank Road And Boundary Wall				57°02′50″N 3°02′19″W	Category B	21848	Upload Photo
Bridge Square, Monaltrie Hotel Including Boundary Wall				57°02′52″N 3°02′13″W	Category C(S)	21850	Upload Photo
Bridge Street, Bank Of Scotland Including Boundary Walls				57°02′52″N 3°02′19″W	Category C(S)	21841	Upload Photo
Dee Street, Deebank House Including Boundary Wall				57°02′48″N 3°02′19″W	Category C(S)	21843	Upload Photo
Queen's Road, Abergeldie Road And School Lane, Victoria Barracks Including Boundary Wall				57°02′55″N 3°02′49″W	Category B	21832	Upload Photo
School Lane, The Old School Including Boundary Walls And 6 Abergeldie Road				57°02′54″N 3°02′42″W	Category C(S)	50650	Upload Photo
Church Square, Gordon Cottage And 1 Hawthorn Place Including Ancillary Buildings And Boundary Wall				57°02′56″N 3°02′20″W	Category C(S)	21829	Upload Photo
47 Braemar Road, Ravenswood Hotel including Boundary Wall				57°03′01″N 3°03′02″W	Category C(S)	50641	Upload Photo
Corner Of Braemar Road And Invercauld Road, Commemorative Fountain				57°03′02″N 3°02′44″W	Category C(S)	50646	Upload Photo
Dee Street, Ford House Including Boundary Walls And Gatepiers				57°02′46″N 3°02′19″W	Category C(S)	21842	Upload Photo
Ballater, Royal Bridge				57°02′49″N 3°02′11″W	Category B	21851	Upload Photo
Station Square, K6 Telephone Kiosk				57°03′00″N 3°02′24″W	Category B	21853	Upload Photo
Golf Road, St Nathalan's Roman Catholic Church And Presbytery Including Boundary Walls And Gatepiers				57°02′50″N 3°02′43″W	Category C(S)	21831	Upload Photo
Braemar Road, Oakhall (Now Darroch Learg Annexe), Including Boundary Wall And Gatepiers				57°03′04″N 3°03′05″W	Category B	21835	Upload Photo
19 And 21 Queen's Road, Ballater Masonic Lodge Including Boundary Wall, Gate And Lantern				57°02′57″N 3°02′45″W	Category C(S)	50649	Upload Photo

== Key ==
The scheme for classifying buildings in Scotland is:

- Category A: "buildings of national or international importance, either architectural or historic; or fine, little-altered examples of some particular period, style or building type."
- Category B: "buildings of regional or more than local importance; or major examples of some particular period, style or building type, which may have been altered."
- Category C: "buildings of local importance; lesser examples of any period, style, or building type, as originally constructed or moderately altered; and simple traditional buildings which group well with other listed buildings."

In March 2016 there were 47,288 listed buildings in Scotland. Of these, 8% were Category A, and 50% were Category B, with the remaining 42% being Category C.

== See also ==
- List of listed buildings in Aberdeenshire
