= Crail Tolbooth and Town Hall =

Municipal Building in Crail, Scotland

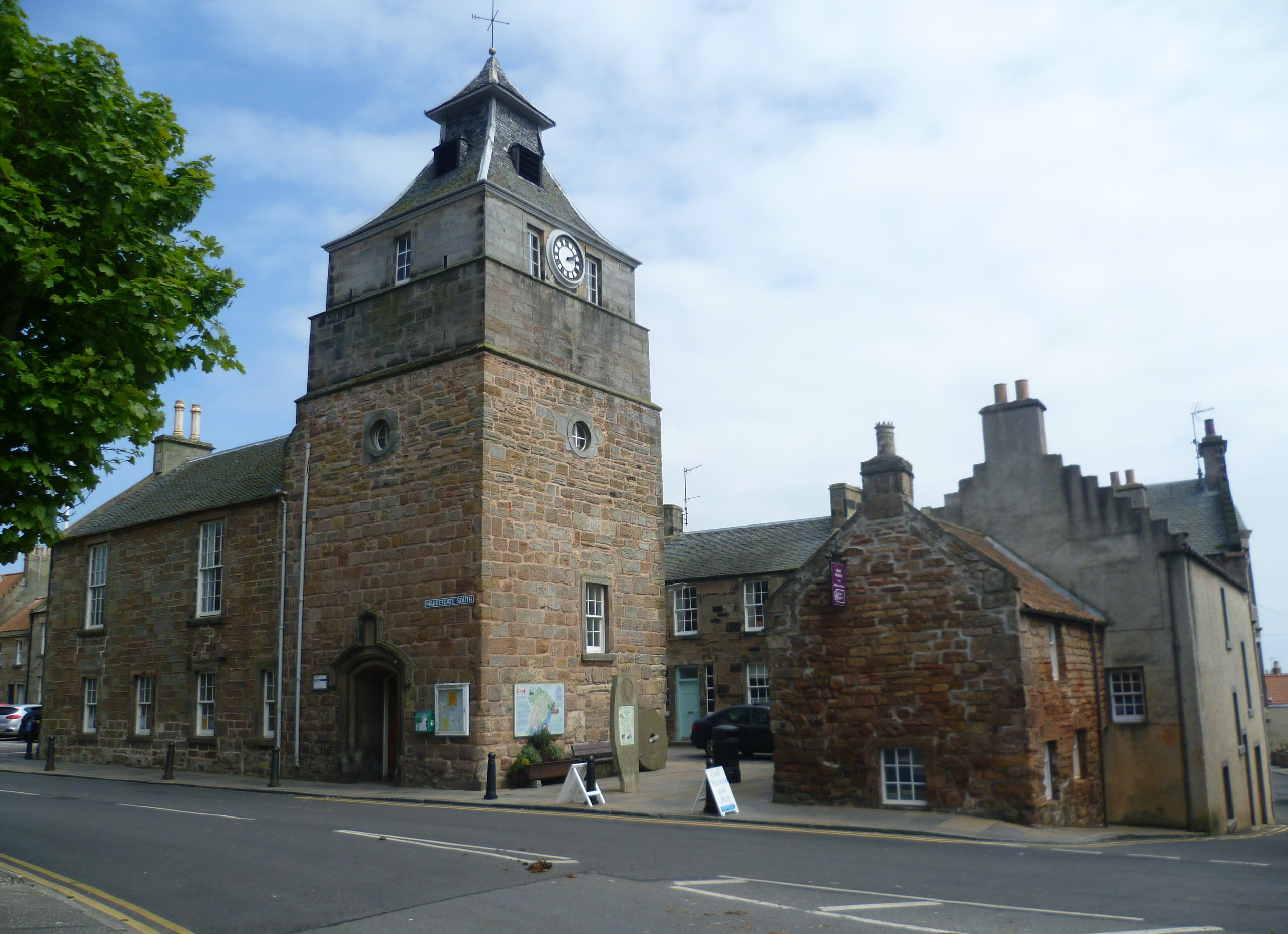
- The building in 2013

- Shown in Fife Crail Tolbooth and Town Hall (Scotland)
- 56.2609°N 2.6261°W
- Location: Marketgate, Crail, Fife

History
- Built: 16th century (tolbooth tower); 1776 (upper stages, bell tower); 1814 (town hall building)

Site notes
- Architectural style: Scottish medieval style

Listed Building – Category A
- Official name: The Tolbooth and Town Hall, Marketgate
- Designated: 9 May 1972
- Reference no.: LB23287

Crail Tolbooth and Town Hall is a municipal structure in Crail, Fife, Scotland. The building, which stands in Marketgate, at its junction with Tolbooth Wynd, is Category A listed.

== History ==
The structure was developed in two discrete sections, the tolbooth and the town hall. The earlier section, the tolbooth, was designed in the Scottish medieval style, built in rubble masonry and was completed in the 16th century. The design involved a main frontage of a single bay facing Marketgate; there was a doorway with a hood mould on the ground floor; the oculus above the doorway, the upper stages of the structure and the slated pagoda-style bell tower all followed in 1776. A bell, cast in Rotterdam in the 16th century, was installed in the bell tower. A weather vane was installed at the top of the bell tower: it took the form of a haddock (known locally as a Crail Capon) rather than the traditional cockerel form.

An earlier iteration of the town hall section was erected in 1602 and replaced, to a design by John Corstorphine (1759–1826), in 1814. The design involved a main frontage of four bays facing Marketgate; the building was fenestrated with four standard sash windows on the ground floor and two tall sash windows in the first and third bays from the left on the first floor. The principal room was the council chamber of the Royal Borough of Crail on the first floor. Internal modifications to the structure, including work to the main doorway, were undertaken by John Currie (1839–1922) of Elie in 1886.

The building continued to serve as the headquarters of the burgh council for much of the 20th century, but ceased to be the local seat of government when the enlarged North East Fife District Council was formed in 1975. However, the town hall, instead, became the meeting place of the Royal Burgh of Crail and District Community Council. The public library, which had been based in the town hall, closed as part of a broader programme of library closures, in 2016. The Lord Lyon King of Arms, Joseph Morrow, passed the front of the town hall on his way to Crail Market Cross, just to the north of the building, where he proclaimed the granting of a coat of arms to the community council in May 2019.

== See also ==
- List of listed buildings in Crail, Fife
- List of Category A listed buildings in Fife
