= David Forrester =

David Forrester (1588–1633) was a Scottish divine.

== Life ==
Forrester appears to have been descended from a Stirlingshire family. His grandfather, William Forrester, was a burgess of Stirling, and he himself possessed the lands of Blairfachane and Wester Mye in that county. Born in 1588, he studied at the University of St. Andrews, where he graduated as M.A. on 22 July 1608. Alexander Livingstone, 1st Earl of Linlithgow presented him to the church of Denny, and he was ordained to the pastorate of that parish on 3 April 1610. Three years afterwards he was translated to North Leith, his induction taking place on 16 December 1613. He strenuously opposed the imposition of the Five Articles of Perth, and so rendered himself obnoxious to King James VI and some of the bishops. The Archbishop of St. Andrews, in whose diocese he served, obtained an order from court to have Forrester cited before the Court of High Commission, and deposed if he refused compliance; but the Bishop of Glasgow, on whom the archbishop threw the execution of the order, declined the business, and Forrester gained a short respite.

Shortly afterwards a conference took place between the bishops and a number of the nonconforming ministers, at the conclusion of which the case of Forrester was resumed. The archbishop informed him that the king desired to know if he would conform, but he declined to give a promise. Hereupon the archbishop told him he had a charge to depose him. But Patrick Forbes, Bishop of Aberdeen, interposed, offering to take Forrester's deposition into his own hands. "For this", said he, "I must needs say that though he be not yet fully resolved, yet he is somewhat more tractable than when he came to us, and though he stand on his own conscience, as every good Christian should do, yet is he as modest, and subject to hear reason, as the youngest scholar in Scotland".

Forrester was thus obliged to betake himself north to Aberdeen, where Bishop Forbes placed him in the church of Rathven, to which he was admitted on 20 April 1620. Here, however, he signalised himself by his energetic measures against the papists, and James VI again gave orders for a process being laid against him. Through the influence of his wife's cousin, Sir William Alexander of Menstrie, afterwards first Earl of Stirling, this was averted, and he was restored to his former charge as "minister of the word of God at the north side of the bridge of the town of Leith", on 20 September 1627. He died there in June 1633, in the forty-fifth year of his age and twenty-fourth of his ministry.

== Family ==
Forrester was twice married: first, on 30 January 1614, to Margaret Paterson of Stirling, by whom he had three sons, Duncan, John, and George; secondly, to Margaret, daughter of Robert Hamilton, brother of the Laird of Preston. Duncan, Forrester's eldest son, was one of the regents in the University of Edinburgh, and was served heir to his father on 13 November 1633.
