= The Golf House Club =

Golf course in Elie, Scotland

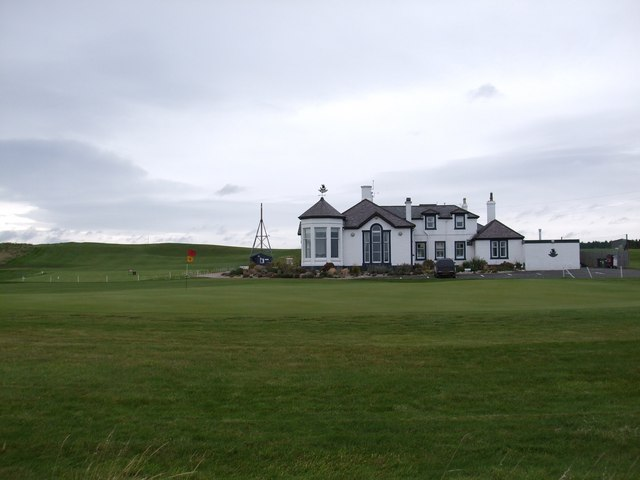
- The club house at Elie Golf Course
- Interactive map of The Golf House Club
- 56°11′30″N 2°49′53″W

Club information
- Location: Elie and Earlsferry, Fife, Scotland
- Established: 1875
- Tota holes: 18
- Website: http://www.golfhouseclub.co.uk/
- Designed by: Old Tom Morris
- Par: 70
- Length: 6,251 yards (5,716 m)

The Golf House Club, Elie established in 1875, is a historic members golf club located in the East Neuk of Fife, Scotland. Members have playing rights over Elie Links, a UK Top 100 Golf Course.

Approximately ten miles from the "spiritual home of golf" at St. Andrews, golf has been played over the links of Elie since the 1500s.

The clubhouse of the GHC is situated directly adjacent to the first tee.

The current course, a par 70 6251-yard course, was largely designed by Old Tom Morris and James Braid in 1895.

The current club, the Golf House Club, was founded in 1875 with the building of the clubhouse. An extension, the work of John Currie, was added in 1907. An unusual feature is the periscope from the Royal Navy submarine HMS Excalibur, that was launched in 1955 and scrapped in 1968. The periscope is installed in the starter's hut; players and visitors may use it to view the golf course.

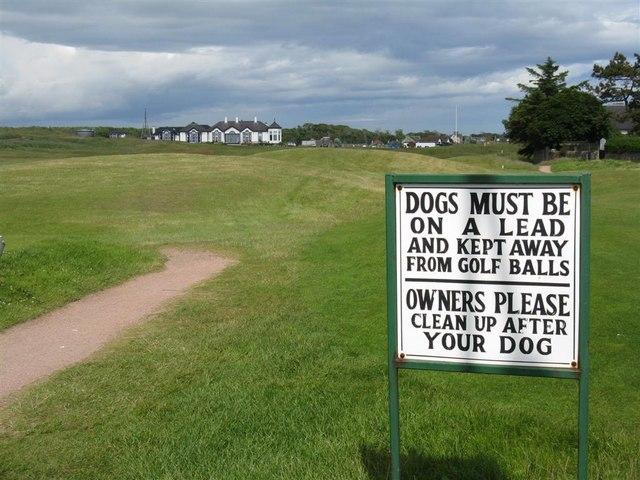
Warning sign with the club house in the distance

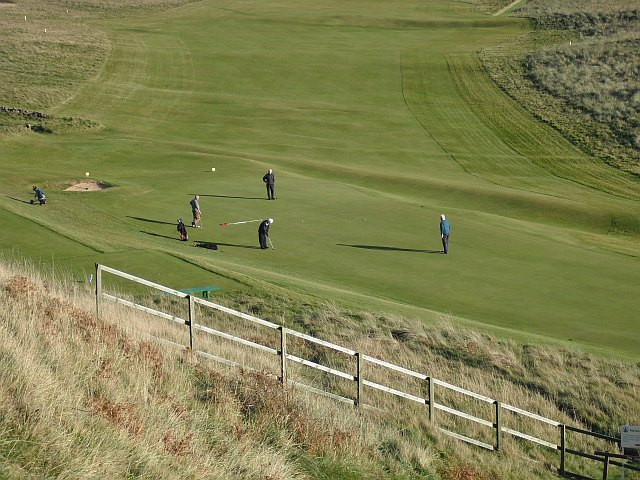
A green on Earlsferry Links

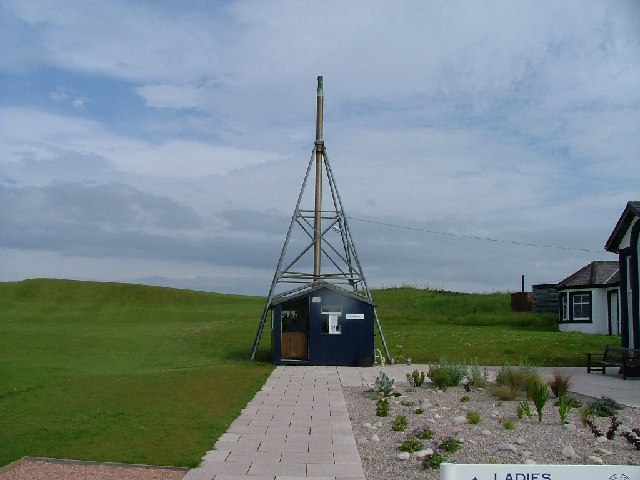
Elie Golf Course Starter Hut and periscope
