= Elie and Earlsferry Town Hall =

Municipal building in Elie and Earlsferry, Scotland

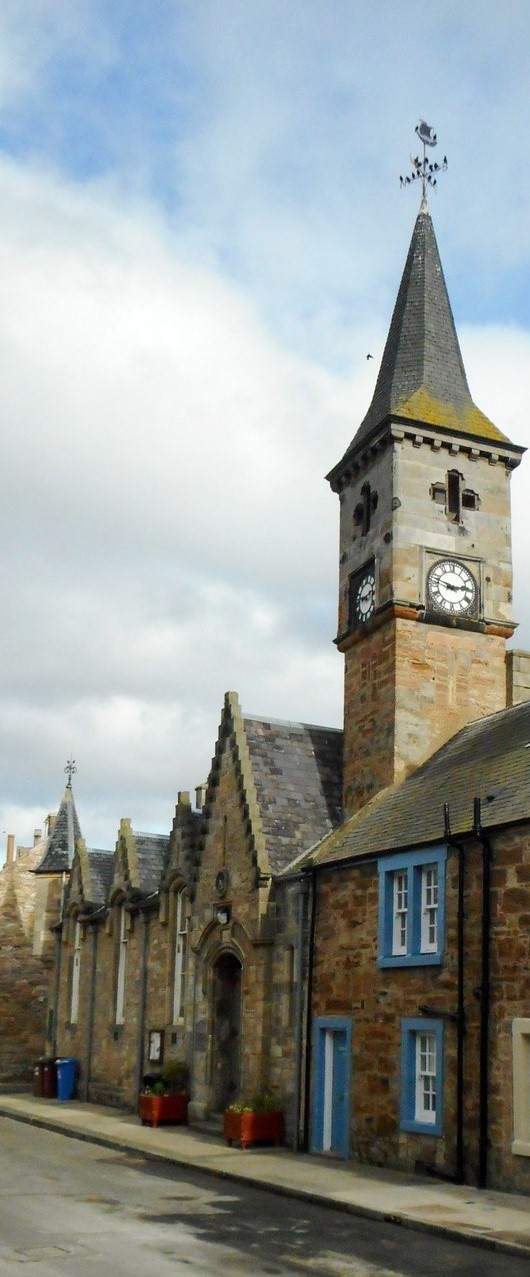
- The building in 2019, looking north along the High Street

- Shown in Fife Elie and Earlsferry Town Hall (Scotland)
- 56.1890°N 2.8339°W
- Location: 19–21 High Street, Elie and Earlsferry

History
- Built: 1873 (153 years ago)

Site notes
- Architect: John Currie
- Architectural style: Scottish baronial style
- Website: https://www.earlsferrytownhall.org.uk

Listed Building – Category B
- Official name: Earlsferry, 19–21 High Street, Town Hall
- Designated: 18 August 1972
- Reference no.: LB31056

Elie and Earlsferry Town Hall is a former municipal structure in High Street in Elie and Earlsferry, Scotland. The structure, which is currently used as an events venue, is Category B listed.

== History ==
The first building on the site was an earlier town house which dated back to 1772. It was a two-story building with a steeple: it contained an assembly room for the burgh leaders on the first floor and a lock-up, which was partly below ground, for petty criminals. It also featured an external staircase, providing access to the assembly room on the first floor, but the staircase was demolished in 1849. By the mid-19th century the town house was old and decrepit and a new town council, elected in 1871, decided to demolish the old building and to replace it with a new structure on the same site.

The foundation stone for the new, single-storey building was laid on 3 September 1872. It was designed by the locally-born architect, John Currie, in the Scottish baronial style, built in rubble masonry and was completed in March 1873. Parts of the old structure, including the steeple, were retained and incorporated into the new structure. The design involved an asymmetrical main frontage with four bays facing onto the High Street; the first three bays on the left were fenestrated by narrow round headed sash windows surmounted by stepped gables, while the right hand bay contained a round headed doorway surmounted by a date stone and a stepped gable. There was a small bartizan at the left hand corner of the building and, behind and to the right of the doorway was the old steeple, which featured clock faces and a belfry and which was surmounted by a spire. The bell in the belfry was cast at John C. Wilson's bell foundry in Glasgow in 1864.

The building continued to serve as the meeting place of the burgh of Earlsferry until 1930, when it became the town hall of the enlarged burgh of Elie and Earlsferry. After the Second World War, a plaque was presented by Polish parachute forces and placed on the front of the building: the plaque had been presented by members of the Polish 1st Independent Parachute Brigade to reflect their gratitude at the hospitality they had received during their stay in the burgh during the war. Another plaque was installed, in June 1951, just on the left of the doorway, to commemorate the life of the locally-born golfer, James Braid, who won the Open Championship five times.

The building ceased to be the local seat of government when the enlarged North-East Fife District Council was formed in 1975. However, the building continued to be used as a venue for local community events. In December 2020, a local community group made an offer to Fife Council to acquire ownership of the building. After securing a grant of £42,500 from the Scottish Land Fund, the community group completed the acquisition in 2021.

== Architectural detail ==
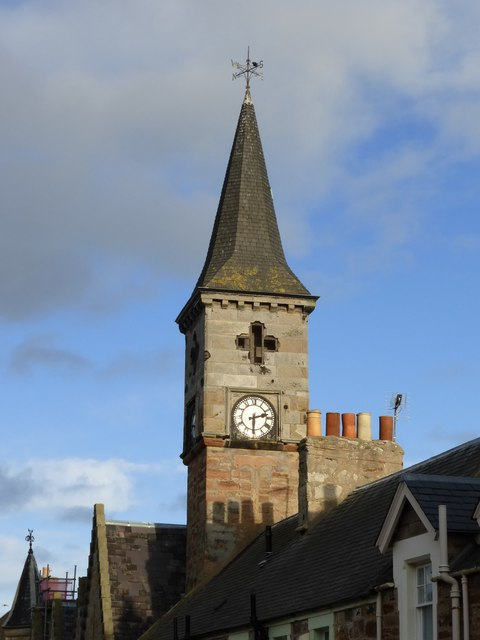
Clock tower, the lower section of which is a remnant of the former town house

Gable dormers in the crow-stepped design

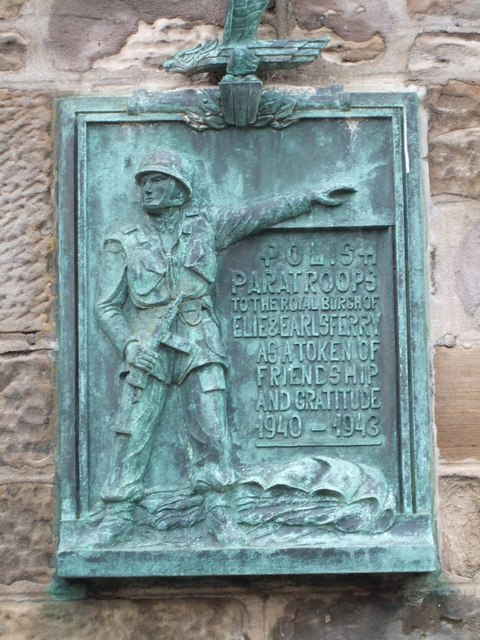
A plaque on the building, gifted by Polish paratroops who were stationed in the town during the Second World War

A plaque on the building commemorating the life of James Braid

== See also ==
- List of listed buildings in Elie and Earlsferry, Fife
