= David Cunningham Greig =

Geologist and cartographer

David Cunningham Greig FRSE FGS (1922–1999) was a British geologist and cartographer. He was Principal Geologist for HM Geological Survey from 1958 to 1982. He was a keen hill-walker and mountaineer.

== Life ==
He was born in Glasgow on 16 February 1922. He attended Glasgow High School then Glasgow University. His education was interrupted by the Second World War during which he served in Europe and East Africa in the REME. During this period his adjutant was Robert Eden, who inspired his interest in Geology. After demob he then completed his university education, graduating MA BSc.

He joined HM Geological Survey as a Geologist in 1951 and was rapidly promoted to the post of Principal Geologist within 7 years. Based in the London office his original survey work included South Wales and the West Midlands and heavy involvement in exploratory work for the National Coal Board. In 1953 he began a major accurate remapping of the geology of the Church Stretton area at 1:50,000.

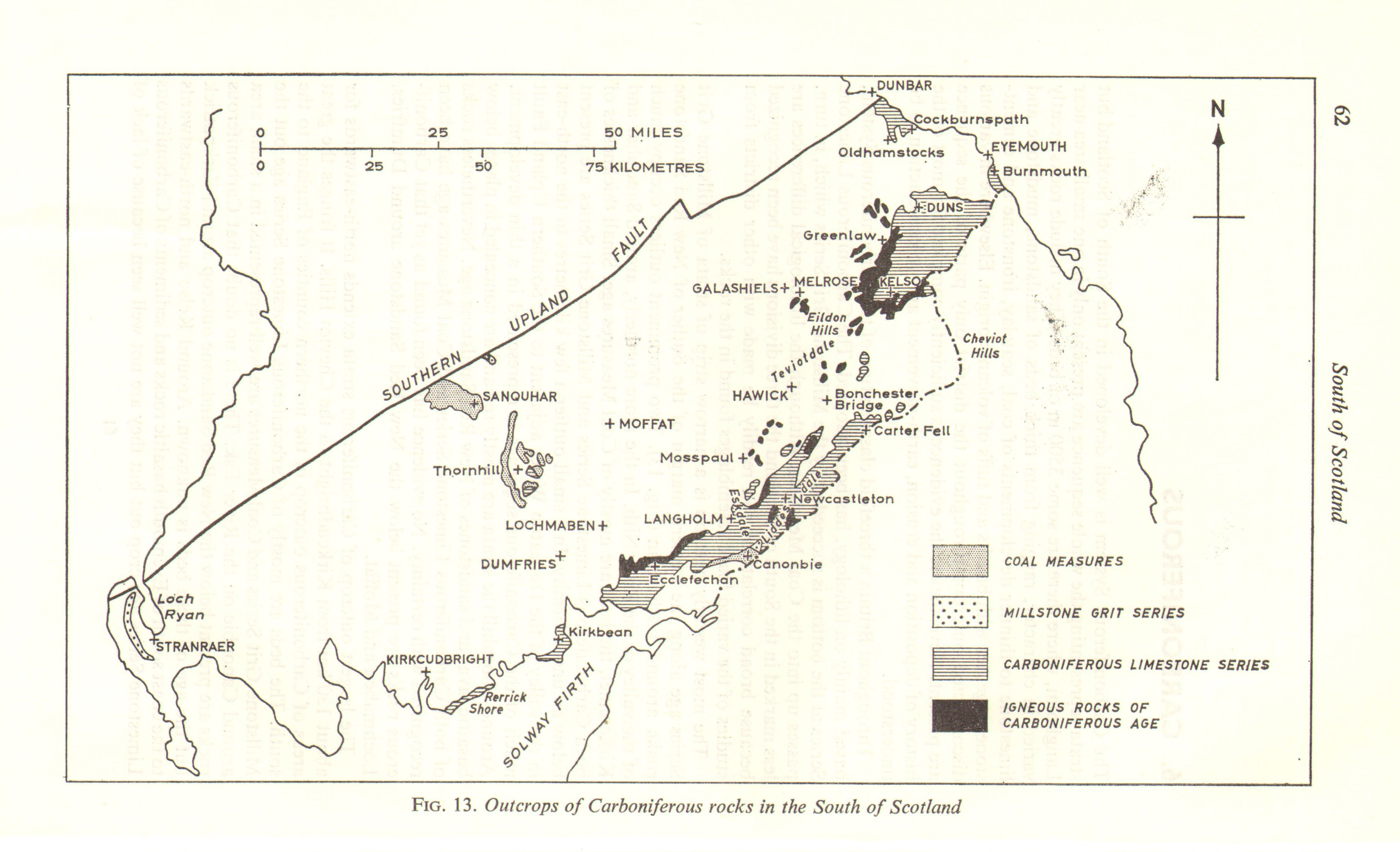
Carboniferous rocks in the south of Scotland. From Greig (1971).

In May 1962 he returned to Scotland, this time based in Edinburgh as part of the South Lowland Unit then at Grange Terrace, under his old acquaintance, Robert Eden. Here he was tasked with mapping the Eyemouth area where his mountaineering experience helped considerably with the survey of the district's difficult cliff areas. During this period he rented a cottage in Coldingham. In the 1970s focus moved from mapping to the routing of Scotland's gas pipelines. During this period he joined the Edinburgh Geological Society, serving as its Secretary 1965 to 1970 and President 1973 to 1975.

In 1975 he was elected a Fellow of the Royal Society of Edinburgh. His proposers were G Innes Lumsden, James Andrew Robbie, George Hoole Mitchell, and Charles D Waterston.

In 1977 he received the Queen's Jubilee Medal for his work in relocating the HM Survey to Murchison House.

He retired to Elie on the Fife coast in 1982, aged 60, and died there on 4 July 1999.

== Family ==
He married Lanchen in 1951.

== Publications ==
- Geology of the Country around Church Stretton (1968)
- British Regional Geology: The South of Scotland (1971). London: Her Majesty's Stationery Office
- Geology of the Eyemouth District (1988)
