= Denny, Falkirk =

Town in Falkirk, Scotland

Coordinates: 56.018°N 3.907°W

Denny: Scottish Gaelic: An Daingneach
- Town
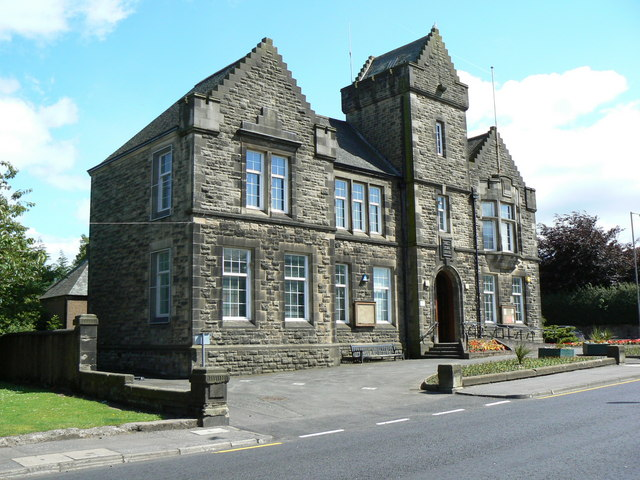
- Denny Town House

- Location within the Falkirk council area
- Area: 1.03 sq mi (2.7 km^{2})
- Population: 9,384 (2022)
  - Density: 9,111/sq mi (3,518/km^{2})
- OS grid reference: NS806818
  - Edinburgh: 28.5 mi (45.9 km)
  - London: 348 mi (560 km)
- Council area: Falkirk
- Lieutenancy area: Stirling and Falkirk
- Country: Scotland
- Sovereign state: United Kingdom
- Post town: DENNY
- Postcode district: FK6
- Dialling code: 01324
- Police: Scotland
- Fire: Scottish
- Ambulance: Scottish
- UK Parliament: Falkirk
- Scottish Parliament: Falkirk West
- Website: falkirk.gov.uk

Denny (Scottish Gaelic: an Daingneach) is a town in the Falkirk council area of Scotland. Historically in Stirlingshire, it is situated 7 miles (11 kilometres) west of Falkirk, and 6 miles (10 km) northeast of Cumbernauld, adjacent to both the M80 and M876 motorways. In 2022, Denny had a population of 9,384.

== History ==
Denny is separated from the neighbouring village Dunipace by the River Carron. A stone bridge was built over the river in 1825. Denny Town House was completed in 1931. Until the early 1980s, Denny was a centre for heavy industry, including several iron foundries, brickworks, a coal mine and paper mills.

The first phase of a £7.6 million regeneration scheme in the town centre was completed in 2017.

== Sport ==
The local football team are Dunipace F.C., who play at Westfield Park where they moved to from their previous home of Carronbank. They compete in the Lowland Football League. Another team, Denny Hibs, operated in the Junior leagues from the 1900s to the 1930s – Dunipace were also part of that setup until the 2010s.

Notable sportspeople from Denny include:

- Sammy Baird, football player and manager
- Cameron Buchan, rower
- Martyn Corrigan, football player and manager
- Kenny Deuchar, footballer
- Willie Loney, footballer
- Niall Mackenzie, motorcycle racer
- Danny Malloy, boxer
- Jimmy McMullan, professional footballer
- Jim McNab, footballer
- Thomas Scott, footballer
- Billy Steel, footballer

== Notable people ==
- Thomas Bain, politician
- John Adam Cramb, historian
- David Forrester, divine
- George William Gray, chemist
- Matthew Hay, doctor
- Carl Kirkwood, politician
- Christian Maclagan, archaeologist
- Stevie McCrorie, musician
- William Morehead, landowner

In the First World War 902 men signed up from Denny and Dunipace. Of those, 154 were killed in action or died on service. Decorations were earned by 31 men.
