= John Currie (Scottish architect) =

Scottish architect (1839–1922)

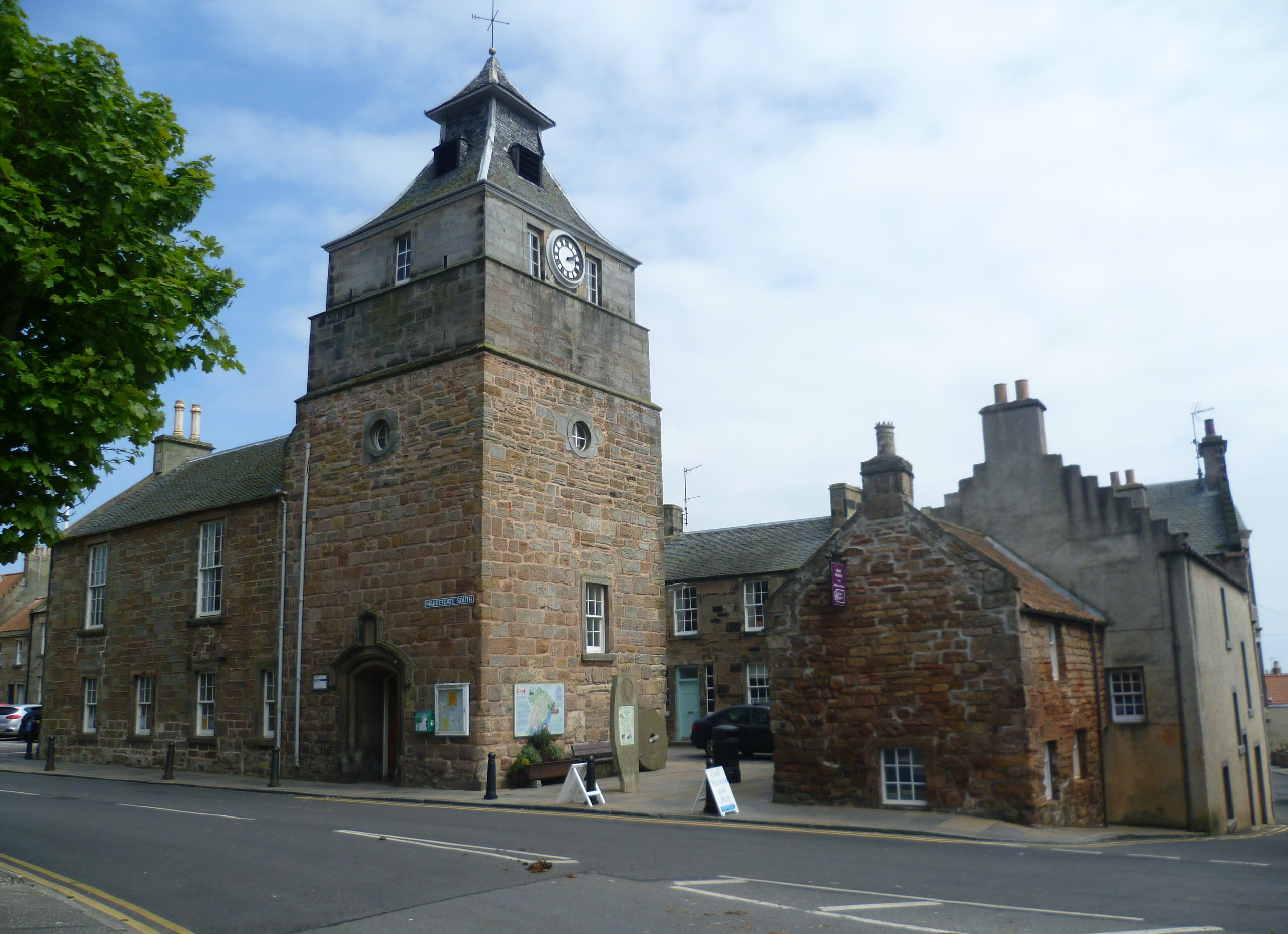
- Currie was responsible for the door and interior alterations at Crail Tolbooth and Town Hall in 1886
- Born: 14 December 1839; Elie, Fife, Scotland
- Died: 22 September 1922 (aged 82); Elie, Fife, Scotland
- Occupation: Architect

John Currie (14 December 1839 – 25 September 1922) was a Scottish architect, prominent in the 19th and early 20th centuries. He designed several notable buildings in Scotland, including town halls, schools and churches. Several of his works are now listed buildings.

== Early life ==
Currie was born on 14 December 1839, in Elie, Fife, to Thomas Currie and Helen Ovenstone. Currie's father was an architect and builder, and it is believed John was articled to his practice. From around 1862, he was understood to be in partnership with his father.

== Career ==
Around 1862, Currie's father's business became Thomas Currie & Sons, presumably marking John's joining the company.

Currie was working independently around 1870, in a practice at 5 St Andrew Square in Edinburgh. It does not seem that the business had a long existence, for it appeared in the Post Office directory for 1870–71 only.

He returned to his hometown, Elie, and formed another independent practice, with his father as his main client.

Currie's son, Thomas William, went into practice (named J. & T. W. Currie) with him in late 1903 or early 1904.

=== Selected notable works ===
- Elie Parish Church (1855) – now Category B listed
- Elie Primary School (1858) – north block only; now Category C listed
- Elie and Earlsferry Town Hall (1872) – now Category B listed
- Kellie Castle, Pittenweem (1878) – repairs; now Category B listed
- Crail Tolbooth and Town Hall (1886) – alterations, including doorway; now Category A listed
- Crail mercat cross (1887) – capital and finial added; – now Category B listed
- Elie and Earlsferry Town Hall (1887)
- Claremont, Elie (1897)
- Elie Golf Club clubhouse (1907) – addition

== Personal life ==
Currie was married to Grace Curror. She died on 19 December 1912, aged 57. They had three children: Thomas, Grace and Margaret.

== Death ==
Currie died on 25 September 1922, aged 82. At the time of his death, he was living at his villa, Claremont (in Links Place, Elie), which he built in 1897. He is interred in the kirkyard of Elie Parish Church, one of his works.
