= Ardrossan Civic Centre =

Municipal Building in Ardrossan, Scotland

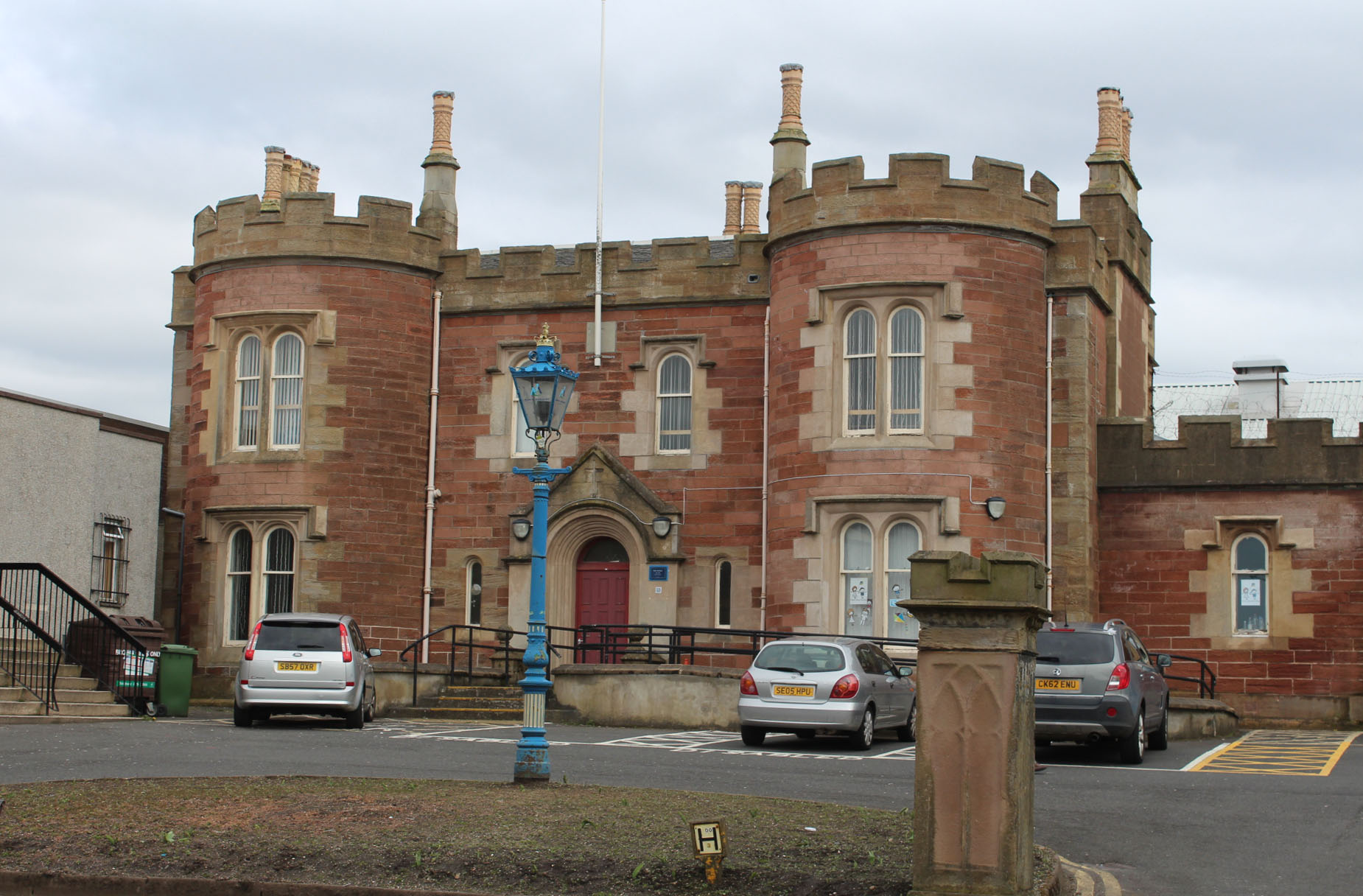
- Ardrossan Civic Centre

- Shown in North Ayrshire
- 55.6431°N 4.8115°W
- Location: Glasgow Street, Ardrossan

History
- Built: 1851

Site notes
- Architectural style: Gothic Revival style

Listed Building – Category B
- Official name: Town Hall, Glasgow Street, Ardrossan
- Designated: 14 April 1971
- Reference no.: LB21267

Ardrossan Civic Centre is a municipal building in Glasgow Street, Ardrossan, North Ayrshire, Scotland. The building, which is largely used as a community events venue, is a Category B listed building.

== History ==
The building was commissioned by a new inhabitant to the town from the north of Scotland, Duncan Graham, as a private house, in the mid-19th century. It was designed in the Gothic Revival style, built in pink rubble masonry with stone dressings and completed in 1851. The design involved a symmetrical main frontage with three bays facing onto Glasgow Street with the outer bays bowed and battlemented; the central bay featured a doorway with a pointed stone surround which was flanked by lancet windows; there were two round headed windows on the first floor and the outer bays featured mullioned windows on both floors. The building, which was originally known as Graham's Castle, was acquired by a colliery owner, Archibald Russell, in 1893. In 1920, the Ardrossan Dry Dock and Shipbuilding Company acquired the building for £10,000, refurbished it, and operated it as the Castlecraigs Recreation Club.

The Ardrossan, Saltcoats and Stevenston Branch of the Royal British Legion was formed at the Castlecraigs Recreation Club on 10 April 1924. The main hall had a fine sprung floor which enabled Castlecraigs Recreation Club to host dances. The Ardrossan Dry Dock and Shipbuilding Company sold the building to the local masonic lodge in 1927.

After being requisitioned and serving as naval barracks during the Second World War, it was acquired by Ardrossan Burgh Council, in an exchange of properties involving the Old Town Hall, in August 1946. It operated as the meeting place of the local burgh council for another three decades, but ceased to be the local seat of government when the enlarged Cunninghame District Council was formed in Irvine in 1975. It was extended to the south west to a design by Robert Rennie & Watson to create an enlarged complex known as the "Ardrossan Civic Centre" in 1978.

In November 2016, a large audience attended a meeting in the civic centre to provide support to a campaign led by North Ayrshire Council, which was ultimately successful, to ensure that the drive-through ferry MV Isle of Arran continued to operate the route from Ardrossan to Brodick on the Isle of Arran, thereby abandoning proposals to change the port of departure from Ardrossan to Troon. A programme of refurbishment works, which included replacement of the windows, was completed in spring 2018.

== See also ==
- List of listed buildings in Ardrossan, North Ayrshire
