= Victoria and Albert Halls =

Municipal building in Ballater, Scotland

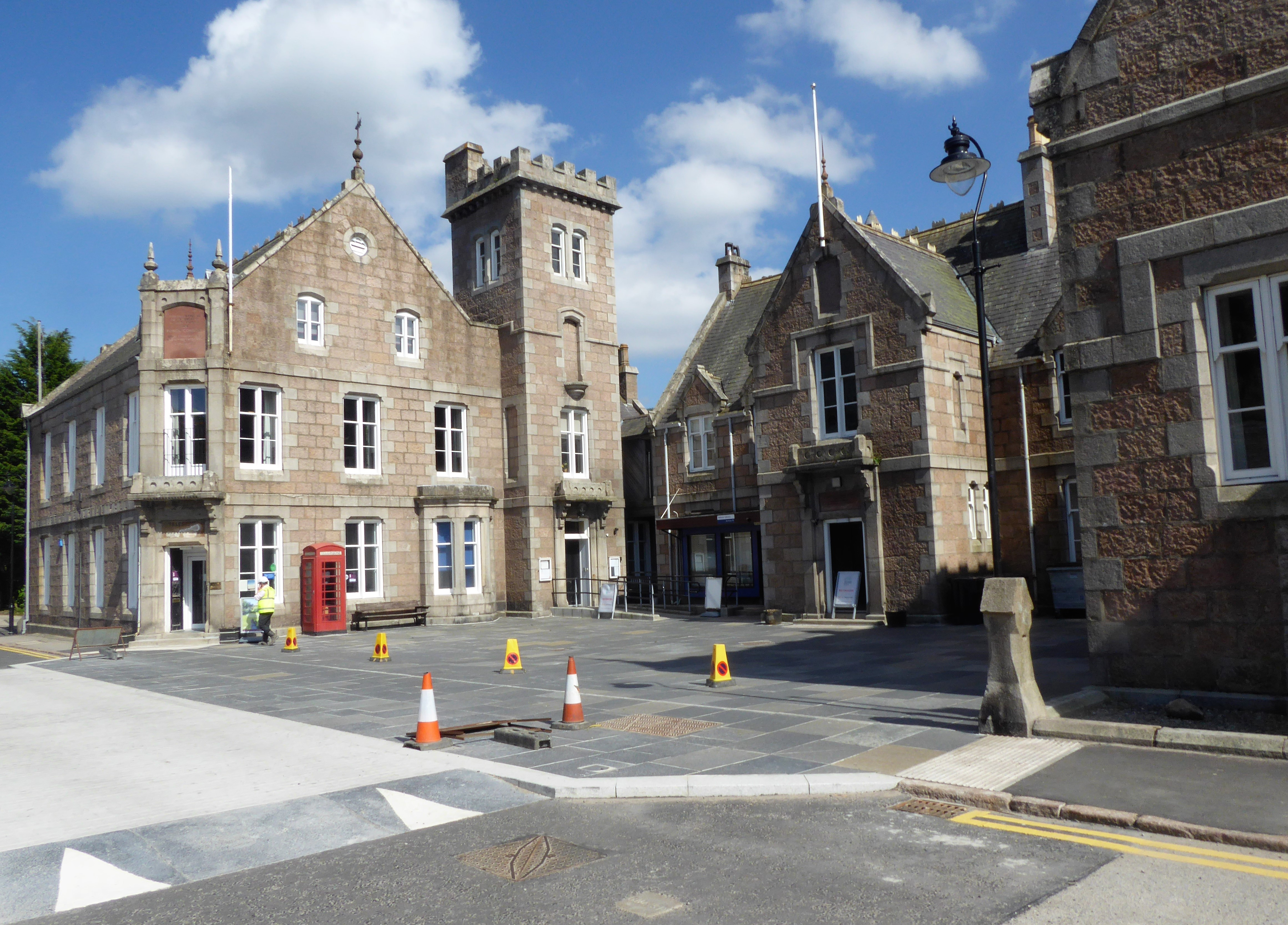
- The Albert Memorial Hall (on the left), the Gordon Institute (centre) and the Victoria Hall (on the right)

- Shown in Aberdeenshire
- 57.0499°N 3.0401°W
- Location: Station Square, Ballater

History
- Built: 1896

Site notes
- Architect(s): W. Duguid & Son
- Architectural style: Neoclassical style

Listed Building – Category C(S)
- Official name: Station Road, Albert Memorial and Victoria Halls and Gordon Institute
- Designated: 25 November 1980
- Reference no.: LB21833

The Victoria and Albert Halls is a complex of municipal buildings in Station Square, Ballater, Aberdeenshire, Scotland. The structure, which accommodates the new Ballater Community and Heritage Hub, is a Category C listed building.

== History ==
The oldest part of the complex, the Albert Memorial Hall, was commissioned by a local brewer, Alexander Gordon, to commemorate the life of Albert, Prince Consort. The site he selected was immediately opposite Ballater railway station where Queen Victoria and the Prince Consort had frequently alighted from the Royal train on their frequent visits to Balmoral Castle. The building was designed by W. Duguid & Son in the neoclassical style, built in granite and was completed in 1876.

The design involved an asymmetrical main frontage of four bays facing onto Station Square. The building was fenestrated with sash windows on both floors and, between the floors, there was a frieze inscribed with the words "Albert Memorial Hall." At the southwest corner there was an additional canted bay featuring a doorway flanked by brackets supporting a balcony; on the first floor, there was a French door flanked by pilasters supporting a panel inscribed with the words "This hall is erected to the memory of the Prince Consort Born 26th August 1817 Died 14th December 1861." A four-stage crenelated tower was erected to southeast corner of the hall: there was a doorway in the first stage, a sash window in the second stage, a niche in the third stage and a pair of sash windows in the fourth stage. Internally, the principal rooms were a public hall, a reading room and a billiard room.

Following significant population growth, largely associated with the tourism industry, Ballater became a police burgh in 1891. In this context, the new burgh leaders decided to extend the complex to form a courtyard. Again, the cost of the development was financed by a gift from Alexander Gordon. The left-hand side of the courtyard was to be formed by Albert Memorial Hall; the back of the courtyard was to be formed by a new Gordon Institute and the right-hand side was to be formed by a new Victoria Hall. The foundation stone for the new buildings was laid by Lieutenant-Colonel Alexander Haldane Farquharson, the 14th Lord of Invercauld on 20 June 1895. The new buildings were designed by W. Duguid & Son, built in granite at a cost of £2,000 and were officially opened by Colonel Thomas Innes of Learney on 26 February 1896.

The design of the Gordon Institute involved five bays facing onto the courtyard. The central bay, which slightly projected forward, featured a doorway flanked by brackets supporting a cornice; there was a sash window on the first floor and a gable above containing a plaque recording the gift from Alexander Gordon. The outer bays were fenestrated by sash windows on the ground floor and by windows with dormer heads on the first floor. Internally, the principal rooms were a reading room and a library on the ground floor and a committee room for the use of the burgh council on the first floor. The design of the Victoria Hall involved a gabled structure of three bays facing onto Station Square. The central bay featured a portico flanked by sash windows; there was a Venetian window on the first floor and an oculus above. Internally, the principal room was an assembly hall. After the Second Boer War the committee room in the Gordon Institute was the venue for presentation of medals to local service personnel.

The committee room continued to serve as the meeting place of the burgh council for much of the 20th century, but ceased to be the local seat of government when the enlarged Kincardine and Deeside District Council was formed in 1975. After the introduction of unitary authorities in 1996, it became a meeting place of the Marr Area Committee of Aberdeenshire Council. Following extensive refurbishment work, a new Ballater Community and Heritage Hub was opened by the Duke and Duchess of Rothesay in the complex on 31 August 2021.

== See also ==
- List of listed buildings in Ballater, Aberdeenshire
