= Old Town Hall, Ardrossan =

Municipal Building in Ardrossan, Scotland

Old Town Hall
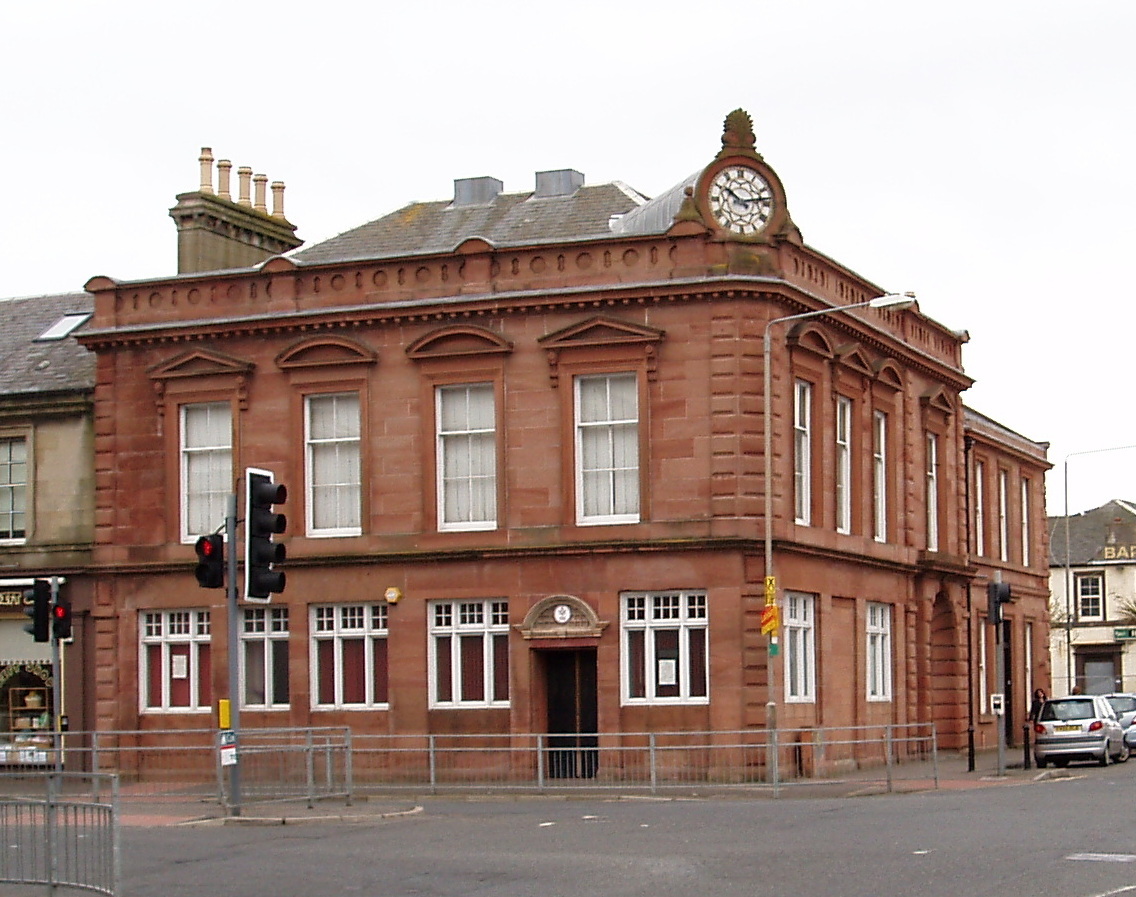
- The building in 2010

- Shown in North Ayrshire
- 55.6400°N 4.8154°W
- Location: Harbour Street, Ardrossan

History
- Built: 1859

Site notes
- Architectural style: Neoclassical style

Ardrossan Civic Centre is a municipal building in Glasgow Street in Ardrossan, a town in North Ayrshire, Scotland. The building, which was previously the offices and meeting place of Ardrossan Burgh Council, is currently used as a masonic hall.

== History ==
Following significant growth in population, largely associated with the status of Ardrossan as a seaport, and following extensive lobbying by Hugh Montgomerie, 12th Earl of Eglinton whose seat was at Eglinton Castle, the area became a burgh in 1846. In this context the new burgh leaders decided to commission a town hall: the site they selected was at the corner of Harbour Street and Princes Street. The foundation stone for the new building was laid by the factor of the Eglinton Castle estate, George Johnstone Redburn, with full masonic honours, on 30 October 1858.

The old town hall was designed in the neoclassical style, built in red sandstone and completed in around 1859. The design involved an asymmetrical frontage extending for four bays along each of the two streets. The Princes Street elevation featured a round headed opening with a rusticated surround in the right hand bay. It was fenestrated with casement windows on the ground floor and with sash windows with alternating segmental and triangular pediments on the first floor and there was a parapet above. A clock, with a stone surround and an acroterion above, was presented by the then provost, John Hogarth, and unveiled at the corner of the building above the parapet in June 1887.

In the 19th century, Justice of the Peace court hearings were typically held in the town hall. Meanwhile, a police station was subsequently established on the opposite side of Princes Street.

The building continued to serve as the offices and meeting place for Ardrossan Burgh Council for most of the first half of the 20th century, but ceased to be the local seat of government when the council sold the old town hall to the local masonic lodge, in an exchange of properties involving a building known as Castlecraigs, in August 1946.

After being damaged in a storm, the mechanical clock on the old town hall was given an electric mechanism in November 1983, and the exterior of the building was cleaned, with financial support from the Historic Buildings Council for Scotland, in late 1997. The building continues to accommodate the offices and meeting place of the local masonic lodge.
