= Denny Town House =

Municipal building in Denny, Scotland

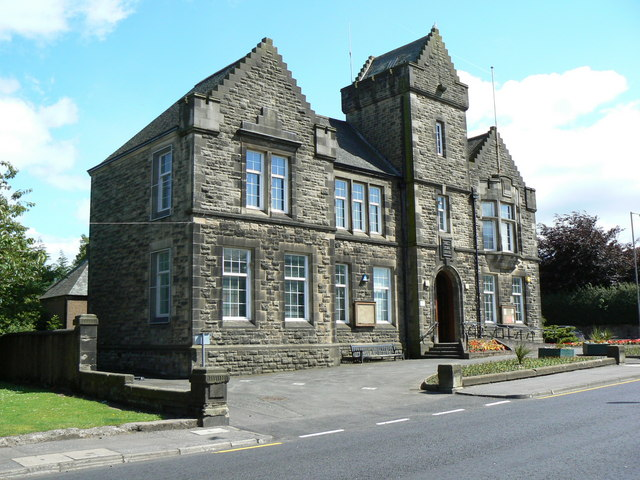
- Denny Town House

- Shown in Falkirk
- 56.0209°N 3.9069°W
- Location: Glasgow Road, Denny

History
- Built: 1931

Site notes
- Architect: Robert Wilson
- Architectural style: Scottish baronial style

Denny Town House is a municipal building in Glasgow Road, Denny, Falkirk, Scotland. The structure is used by Falkirk Council for the provision of local services.

== History ==
The first municipal building in the town was a public hall in Glasgow Road which was commissioned by a local businessman, David Anderson, in 1889. It was leased to the burgh council for municipal use in 1903. However, in the late 1920s, burgh leaders decided to commission a purpose-built town house and the public hall was let out as a cinema.

The new building was designed by Robert Wilson of local architects, Strang & Wilson, in the Scottish baronial style, built in rubble masonry and was completed in 1931.

The design involved an asymmetrical main frontage with seven bays facing onto Glasgow Road. The first section of two bays, which was slightly projected forward, was fenestrated by two sash windows on the ground floor and a bi-partite mullioned window on the first floor with a stepped gable above. The second section was fenestrated by two sash windows on the ground floor and a tri-partite mullioned window on the first floor. The third section of just one bay, which also slightly projected forward, took the form of a three-stage tower; the tower featured a doorway with a hood mould and a keystone in the first stage, a small sash window in the second stage and a lancet window in the third stage with a castellated parapet and a stepped gable above. The fourth section was fenestrated by sash windows on the ground floor and an oriel window on the first floor with a stepped gable above. Internally, the principal rooms were the burgh chambers and the offices of the burgh officials. A stained-glass window depicting the seal of the burgh of Denny and Dunipace was installed in a first-floor window on the south side of the building.

The building continued to serve as the meeting place of the burgh council for much of the 20th century, but ceased to be the local seat of government when the enlarged Falkirk District Council was formed in 1975. It was subsequently used by Falkirk Council as a base for the delivery of social services. However, in May 2021, the council announced that, as a result of a strategic property review, the building would close.
