= Elie and Earlsferry =

Coordinates: 56.18988°N 2.82334°W

- Location within Fife
- Population: 640 (2020)
- OS grid reference: NO4900
- Council area: Fife
- Lieutenancy area: Fife
- Country: Scotland
- Sovereign state: United Kingdom
- Post town: Leven
- Postcode district: KY9
- Dialling code: 01333
- Police: Scotland
- Fire: Scottish
- Ambulance: Scottish
- UK Parliament: North East Fife
- Scottish Parliament: North East Fife

Elie and Earlsferry is a coastal town and former royal burgh in Fife, and parish, Scotland, situated within the East Neuk beside Chapel Ness on the north coast of the Firth of Forth, eight miles east of Leven. The burgh comprised the linked villages of Elie (/ˈiːli/ EE-lee) to the east and to the west Earlsferry, which were formally merged in 1930 by the Local Government (Scotland) Act 1929. To the north is the village of Kilconquhar and Kilconquhar Loch.

The civil parish has a population of 861 (in 2011).

== Ancient times ==
Earlsferry, the older of the two villages, was first settled in time immemorial. It is said that MacDuff, the Earl of Fife, crossed the Forth here in 1054 while fleeing from King Macbeth. In particular the legend tells of his escape being aided by local fishermen, an act which may have led directly to the village being promoted to royal burgh status due to MacDuff's later influence over Malcolm III.

By the middle of the 12th century, the Earls of Fife had instituted a ferry for the use of pilgrims en route to the shrine of Saint Andrew the Apostle at St Andrews. The ferry crossed the Firth of Forth to North Berwick, a distance of 7 miles, and it is this ferry that led to the naming of the place. There are the remains of a small chapel on Chapel Ness, built for the use of these pilgrims.

King Robert II made Earlsferry a royal burgh in 1373 but its original charter was destroyed in a fire. Earlsferry became a trading port for merchants and remained so until the 18th century, and was also an important calling point on the pilgrims' route from the south to St Andrews. A new charter was granted in 1589 by James VI. In 1871 Earlsferry had a population of 406. Little is known of the foundation of Elie, but in 1599 it was made a burgh of barony by King James VI and it had become sufficiently important to merit the building of Elie Parish Church in 1639. Its harbour was more sheltered than that of Earlsferry, it began to poach trade away from Earlsferry and after a great storm in 1766 filled it with sand, Earlsferry harbour was no longer used.

The etymology of the name Elie is unclear. The name may derive from the Scottish Gaelic ealadh which means 'tomb', or èaladh which means 'a passage for boats between two rocks', or ail plus the suffix in which means 'rock-place'.

== Buildings ==
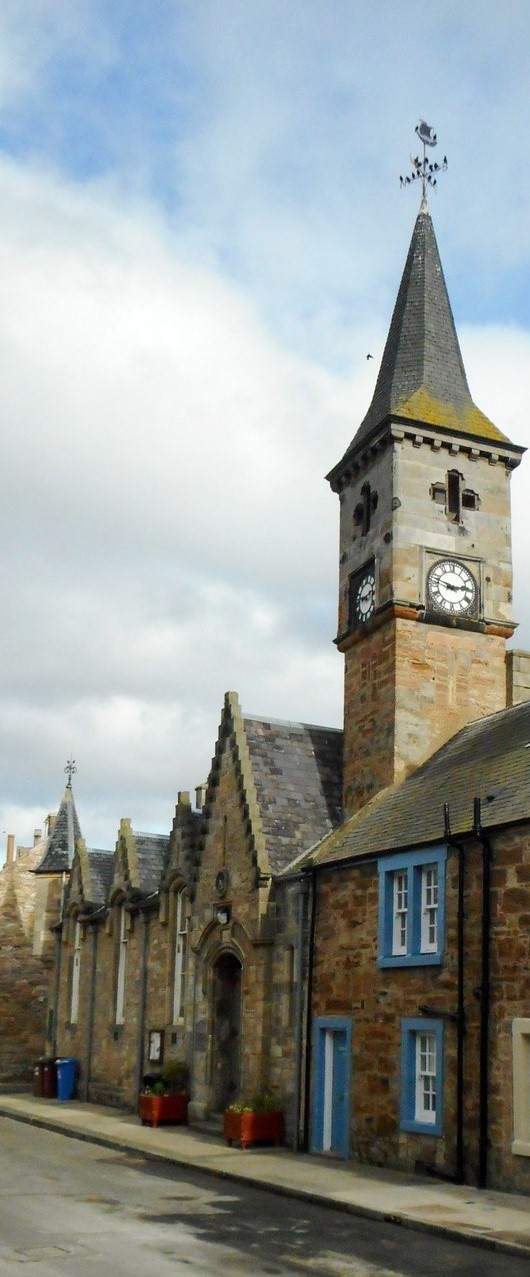
Elie and Earlsferry Town Hall

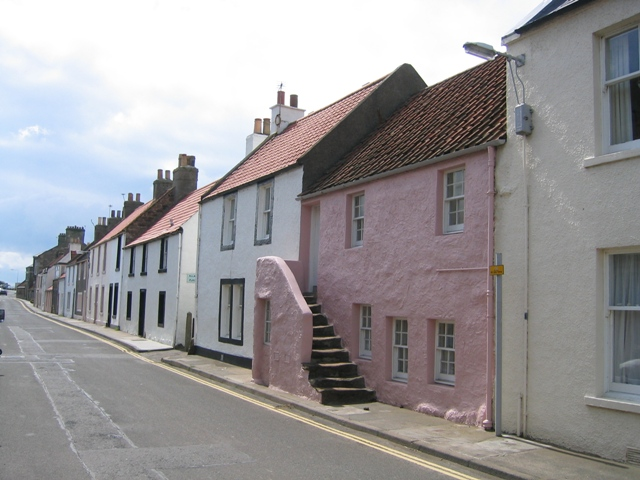
Earlsferry High Street

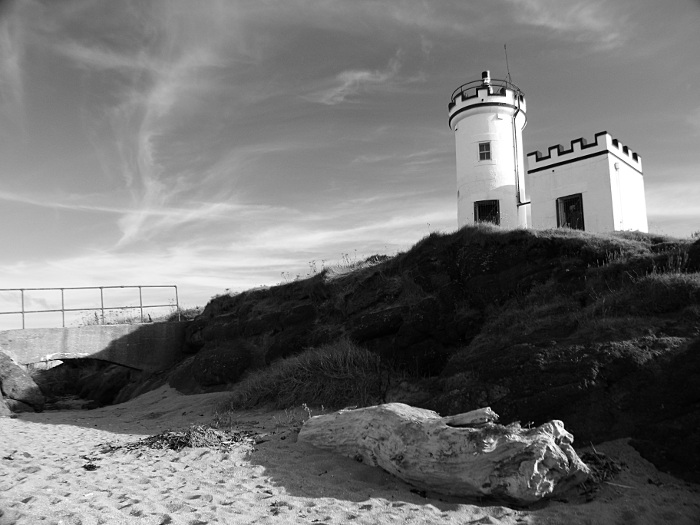
Elie Lighthouse in black and white

Elie has an unusual parish church, dating from 1639. It has a tall octagonal tower, topped with a belvedere detail, centrally located on the church. It is approached on axis from the High Street, increasing the drama of its architecture, and surrounded by a churchyard burial ground.

Elie House is an interesting Scots vernacular extended tower house, standing close to the waterline. It dates back to 1697 with additions in 1770.

In the 1770s the Lady's Tower was built in Ruby Bay, on the east side of Elie Ness, for Janet, Lady Anstruther. It incorporated a vaulted chamber at sea level as a changing room. It is said that Lady Anstruther would bathe in the nearby waters, a servant ringing a bell all the while to ensure locals stayed away. The daughter of Provost Charles Fall of Dunbar, she was mentioned by Thomas Carlyle as Jenny Faa ("Faa" being purportedly the Fall family's ancient name) "a coquette and a beauty". She caused the hamlet of Balclevie, to the north of Elie House, to be razed ostensibly "to improve the view" but widely thought to be because the tinker inhabitants reminded her of her own family's origins. This may have been Walter Scott's inspiration for a similar incident in Guy Mannering. A curse is said to have been placed on the Anstruther family by an old woman whose house had been demolished.

Elie Primary School dates to 1858 and is in a Category C listed building. Elie and Earlsferry Town Hall was completed in 1873 but contains elements of an earlier town house.

== Post-Reformation ==
After the Scottish Reformation, pilgrimages and other traffic waned in Earlsferry.

== Sport ==
=== Golf and tennis ===
Elie and Earlsferry are about ten miles due south of St Andrews. Golf is believed to have been played on Earlsferry Links as early as the 15th century, and the layout evolved over time into the current 18-hole course which has remained largely unchanged since 1895.

There has been a formal golf club here in Elie and Earlsferry since 1832. The current club, the Golf House Club, was founded in 1875 with the building of the clubhouse. An unusual feature is the periscope from the submarine HMS Excalibur. It was installed in the starter's hut after the submarine was scrapped in 1968; players and visitors may use it to view the golf course.

Golfers, clubmakers and course designers James Braid, Archie Simpson, Bob Peebles and Isaac Mackie were born in Earlsferry.

Neighbouring the Golf House Club is the Elie Sports Club, which encompasses a multi-sports facility. Its facilities include a 9-hole golf course (2080 yards long), a putting course, a driving range with covered bays and outdoor hitting areas and a short game practice area with two bunkers and a 50-yard pitching fairway. There are also five full-size tennis courts and four short tennis courts along with a bowling green.

=== Cricket ===
Elie has a cricket club, which is based at The Ship Inn pub on the beachfront. The team arrange all their home fixtures in line with the tides and play them on the beach when the tide is out.

== Modern times ==
Elie's harbour was expanded in 1850. The nearby railway, part of the Fife Coast Railway, was built in 1857, and extended through Elie to Anstruther in 1863. The villages opened up to the affluent tourist trade of Victorian times in the 1870s, which saw regular steamers from North Berwick and Leith.

The explosion of modern communications saw the nature of the local economy change. Coal mining dwindled after the railway came to the area. Linen weavers abandoned their trade when cheaper imported cotton fabrics from the overseas colonies of the British Empire swamped the domestic market. Fishing gradually declined. The growing tourist trade caused a local building boom, which would have provided stonemasonry work. There were also golf club makers in the village for many years. Various support trades existed in the villages over the years and persisted until the advent of modern road transport around 1970.

Elie and Earlsferry were formally merged in 1930.

In recent decades, the town has become a very popular destination for wealthy residents of Glasgow and Edinburgh. During the summer months, the town's population is several times higher than it is during the winter. A survey in 2018 found that half of the properties in the town were not the owners first residences. Attractions include the beach, golf, restaurants, surfing and sailing. Elie won an award as one of the best managed beaches in Scotland in 2018.

The railway line was selected as part of the Beeching Axe in the 1960s, and the station and tracks were subsequently closed and dismantled; leaving Elie with only road and sea transport links.

The Times included Elie and Earlsferry as one of the best places to live in the UK in 2020.

=== Elie Chain Walk ===
On the coast, 1 km west of Earlsferry, beneath the Fife Coastal Path, the Elie Chain Walk passes down the cliff faces to the tidal beaches.

The route, which should only be used during low tides, has chains fixed to the cliffs and rocks of the shore to assist progress, and is sometimes referred to as Scotland's secret via ferrata (iron path).

The chains were first installed in the 1920s, and were replaced in 2010.

== Notable events ==
The film The Winter Guest, starring Emma Thompson and Phyllida Law, directed by Alan Rickman, was filmed here.

== Bus services ==
The two main bus services are provided by Stagecoach South Scotland. These are:

- 95 from Leven to St Andrews via Anstruther and Crail
- X61 from Edinburgh to St Andrews via Kirkcaldy, Leven and Anstruther

== Notable residents ==
- James Braid, Scottish professional golfer, five-time winner of The Open Championship and renowned golf course architect, was born in Earlsferry in 1870.
- Catherine Calderwood, Northern Irish consultant obstetrician and gynaecologist, and Chief Medical Officer for Scotland from 2015 to 2020.
- David Cunningham Greig geologist, retired to Elie and died there.
- John Currie, architect and builder
- William Dudingston, Rear Admiral, Royal Navy. Dudingston was commander of the schooner HMS Gaspee, which after interfering with smugglers in the Colony of Rhode Island was led aground and burned by American patriots in June 1772. This is referred to as America's "First Blow for Freedom" and a spark to the American Revolution.
- James Horsburgh, hydrographer.
- Alexander Michie (1833-1902), Scottish author, journalist, and businessman in China. Born in Earlsferry.
- William Quarrier Kennedy, Scottish Geologist, resided in Elie between 1967 and 1977.
- Bob Peebles, Scottish-American professional golfer was born here circa 1883.
- Jean Redpath, eminent interpreter of Scots song.
- Walter W. Robertson, architect.
- Robert Traill, author and prisoner on the Bass Rock.

== Clock ==
The famous "floral clock" in Edinburgh's Princes Street Gardens was originally constructed using the clock mechanism salvaged from Elie Parish Church in 1903.

== See also ==
- Elie House
- List of lighthouses in Scotland
- List of Northern Lighthouse Board lighthouses
