= Cellardyke Town Hall =

Municipal building in Cellardyke, Scotland

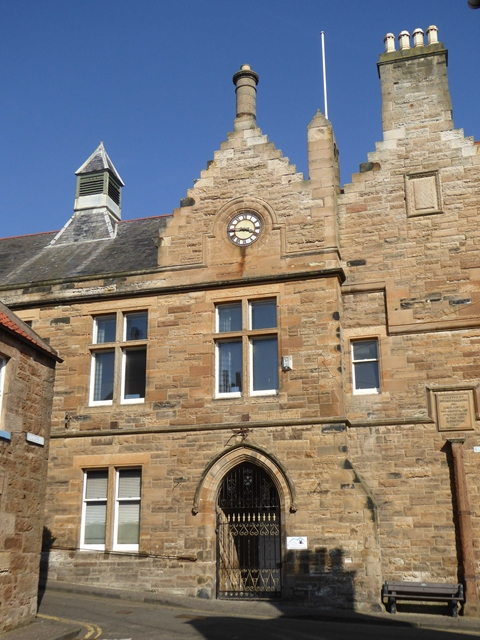
- Cellardyke Town Hall

- Shown in Fife
- 56.2231°N 2.6898°W
- Location: Tolbooth Wynd, Cellardyke

History
- Built: 1883

Site notes
- Architect(s): David Henry and Jesse Hall
- Architectural style: Gothic Revival style

Cellardyke Town Hall is a municipal structure in Tolbooth Wynd, Cellardyke, Fife, Scotland. The building is used for local events. The mercat cross, which has been affixed to the front of the building, is a Category B listed structure.

== History ==
The first municipal building in Cellardyke was a tolbooth which was completed in 1624. A new mercat cross was carved at that time and erected outside the building in 1642. The tolbooth was used as a prison as well as being a regular meeting place for Kilrenny Burgh Council. By the early 1880s, the tolbooth had become dilapidated and the burgh leaders decided to demolish the tolbooth and to erect a new building on the same site. The politician and shipping company founder, Stephen Williamson, and the Australian grocery wholesaler, David Fowler, each agreed to contribute £5,000 to the cost of the new building.

The foundation stone for the new building was laid by the provost, Robert Watson, on 5 April 1882. It was designed by David Henry and Jesse Hall of the St Andrews firm of Henry & Hall, built in rubble masonry and was officially opened as "Kilrenny Town Hall" on 19 September 1883. The design involved an asymmetrical main frontage of five bays facing Tolbooth Wynd. The fourth bay from the left featured an arched opening with a wrought iron gate and a hood mould; there was a mullioned and transomed window on the first floor and a clock face in the stepped gable above. The first three bays on the left were fenestrated in a similar style, while in the right-hand bay, which was recessed, the old mercat cross was affixed to wall. There was a stone plaque above the mercat cross inscribed with the words "Erected by Stephen Williamson and David Fowler For Municipal and other Purposes in this their native town A.D. 1883". The right hand bay was fenestrated by a small window above and to the left of the plaque and was surmounted a stepped gable which contained a plain stone panel. Internally, the principal rooms were the burgh chambers and a meeting room for the St Ayles Masonic Lodge on the ground floor, and the main assembly hall on the first floor.

The council chamber continued to serve as the meeting place of the burgh council into the 20th century but ceased to be the local seat of government when the enlarged Kilrenny, Anstruther Easter and Anstruther Wester Burgh Council was formed at Anstruther Easter Town Hall in 1930. A contingent which formed part of the Polish I Corps was accommodated in the building during the early years of the Second World War.

After North-East Fife District declared its intention to close the building in the mid-1980s, the specially formed Cellardyke Town Hall Committee took a lease on the building in 1988. The committee initiated a programme of refurbishment works which was completed in 1995: the works provided facilities for a local history museum and also enabled allowed the assembly hall to be used as a community events venue. The committee was merged into the East Neuk Centre Trust, which also administered Anstruther Easter Town Hall, in 2015.

Works of art in the town hall include a landscape painted by Sidney Richard Percy depicting highland cattle drinking from the River Llugwy in Northwest Wales.
