= Dreel Halls =

Municipal building in Anstruther, Scotland

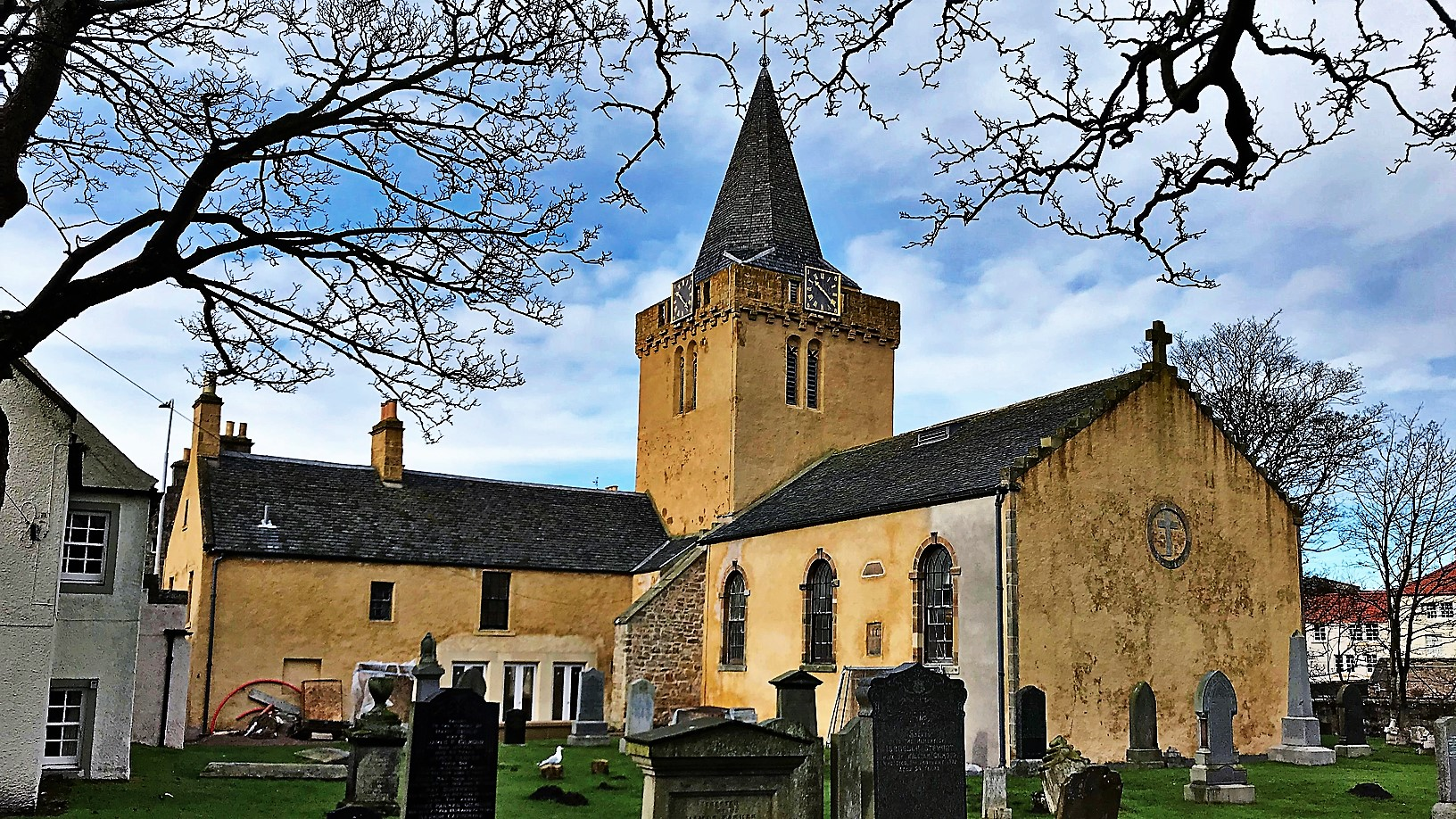
- Dreel Halls showing the former town hall (to the left of the tower) and the tower and main transept of the parish church (to the right)

- Shown in Fife
- 56.2222°N 2.7042°W
- Location: Elizabeth Place, Anstruther Wester

History
- Built: 1795

Site notes
- Architectural style: Scottish medieval style

Listed Building – Category A
- Official name: Anstruther Wester Parish Church (now St Aidan's Church Hall)
- Designated: 9 May 1972
- Reference no.: LB36191

Listed Building – Category C(S)
- Official name: Anstruther Wester Parish Churchyard And Gravestones
- Designated: 9 May 1972
- Reference no.: LB36192

Listed Building – Category C(S)
- Official name: Anstruther Wester Town Hall, Session House and Town Hall
- Designated: 9 May 1972
- Reference no.: LB36193

Dreel Halls is a municipal complex in Elizabeth Place, Anstruther Wester, Fife, Scotland. The complex, which is used as a community events venue, consists of the former St Nicholas's Parish Church, which is a Category A listed building, and the former Anstruther Wester Town Hall, which is a Category C listed building.

== History ==
=== The Parish Church ===
The earliest part of the complex is the parish church dedicated to St Nicholas which was completed in 1243. It was formed by a three-stage tower facing Elizabeth Place, which was rebuilt in harled rubble in about 1510, and a main transept which was rebuilt, also in harled rubble, to a design by James Smith, behind the tower in 1846.

There was a square-headed doorway in the first stage of the tower, a small square window with a wrought iron grill in the second stage, and a belfry with two louvres in the third stage; the tower was surmounted by a modillioned parapet, a spire and a weather vane. The east end of main transept, which was surmounted by a stepped gable, featured a blind oculus containing a simple cross, while the north side was fenestrated by two rounded headed windows with keystones and the south side was fenestrated by three round headed windows with keystones. Internally, the principal room was the main transept which featured an apse at the east end.

A new bell, cast by George Watt of Edinburgh, was installed in the belfry in 1789 and a clock, designed and manufactured by James Ritchie & Son of Broxburn, was installed in the tower in 1868. The church was united with Anstruther Easter Parish Church, which was dedicated to St Adrian, in 1961 and became St Adrian's Church Hall in 1970. It was subsequently renamed the Hew Scott Hall in memory of the local parish priest, Hew Scott, who wrote Fasti Ecclesiae Scoticanae: The succession of ministers in the parish churches of Scotland, from the reformation, A.D. 1560, to the present time.

=== The Town Hall ===
The first municipal building in Anstruther Wester was a tolbooth in the Anstruther Wester Harbour area which dated back at least to the 17th century. After the tolbooth was destroyed in a storm, the burgh council met in the bailie's house until it decided to commission a dedicated burgh hall in the late 18th century. The site they chose for the new building was to the immediate south of the parish church. It was designed in the Scottish medieval style, built in harled rubble and was completed in 1795. The design involved an asymmetrical main frontage of four bays facing Elizabeth Place. The third bay from the left featured a doorway with an architrave, an entablature, a cornice and a small triangular pediment. The other bays were fenestrated, on an irregular basis, by sash windows. Internally, the principal rooms were the local school room on the ground floor and the burgh council chamber on the first floor. The council chamber was decorated with a mural depicting the burgh coat of arms on the south wall.

Although the school relocated in 1827, the council chamber continued to serve as the meeting place of the burgh council into the 20th century; it ceased to be the local seat of government when the enlarged Kilrenny, Anstruther Easter and Anstruther Wester Burgh Council was formed at Anstruther Easter Town Hall in 1930.

=== Restoration ===
In 2013, Fife Historic Buildings Trust acquired the parish church from the Church of Scotland and the town hall from Fife Council and initiated an extensive programme of restoration works to the external fabric of the buildings. The work was carried out by John Smart & Sons (Kirkcaldy) Ltd at a cost of £915,000 to a design by Arc Architects and was completed in January 2014. The complex was renamed Dreel Halls to recall the name of the Dreel Burn which separates Anstruther Easter and Anstruther Wester. The building was then transferred to the ownership of the Anstruther Improvements Association which commissioned a programme of internal works which was completed in September 2020.

== See also ==
- List of listed buildings in Kilrenny, Fife
