= North East Fife =

North East Fife may mean or refer to:

- North East Fife (UK Parliament constituency)
- North East Fife (Scottish Parliament constituency)
- North East Fife (district), a district which existed 1975–1996
