= 1974 North East Fife District Council election =

North East Fife District Council election

Elections to North East Fife District Council were held on 7 May 1974, on the same day as the other Scottish local government elections. This was the first election to the district council following the implementation of the Local Government (Scotland) Act 1973.

The election used the 18 wards created by the Formation Electoral Arrangements in 1974. Each ward elected one councillor using first-past-the-post voting.

The Conservatives took control of the council after winning a majority. The party took 13 of the 18 seats and more than half of the popular vote. The remaining five seats were won by independent candidates.

== Background ==
Prior to 1974, the area that was to become North East Fife contained 13 of the 25 burghs of the County of Fife (Auchtermuchty; Crail; Cupar; Elie and Earlsferry; Falkland; Kilrenny, Anstruther Easter and Anstruther Wester; Ladybank; Newburgh; Newport-on-Tay; Pittenweem; St Andrews; St Monance; and Tayport). These were all small burghs so had limited powers which included some control over planning as well as local taxation, building control, housing, lighting and drainage. The rest of the local government responsibility fell to the county council which had full control over the areas which were not within a burgh.

Following the recommendations in the Wheatly Report, the old system of counties and burghs – which had resulted in a mishmash of local government areas in which some small burghs had larger populations but far fewer responsibilities than some large burghs and even counties – was to be replaced by a new system of regional and district councils. The Local Government (Scotland) Act 1973 implemented most of the recommendations in the Wheatly Report. The northern and eastern areas of the County of Fife which included the 13 burghs was placed into the North East Fife district within the Fife region.

== Election results ==
1974 North East Fife District Council election result
Party	Seats	Gains	Losses	Net gain/loss	Seats %	Votes %	Votes	+/−
Conservative	13				72.2	53.1	10,558	
Independent	5				27.8	31.3	6,223	
Liberal	0				0.0	11.8	2,337	
Labour	0				0.0	3.8	765	

== Aftermath ==
North East Fife was the only district in the newly created Fife region that was won by the Conservatives after the party took 13 of the 18 seats. The remaining five seats were won by independent candidates. Labour won control of the regional council which held its first election on the same day. Across Scotland, Labour won the most votes, the most seats and the most councils of any party.
