= Mary Buick =

Scottish seafarer and nurse

Mary Buick (4 July 1777 – 28 February 1854) was a Scottish nurse who was working aboard Vice-Admiral Nelson's HMS Victory when he died in The Battle of Trafalgar. She tended to Nelson's body and prepared it for its journey home.

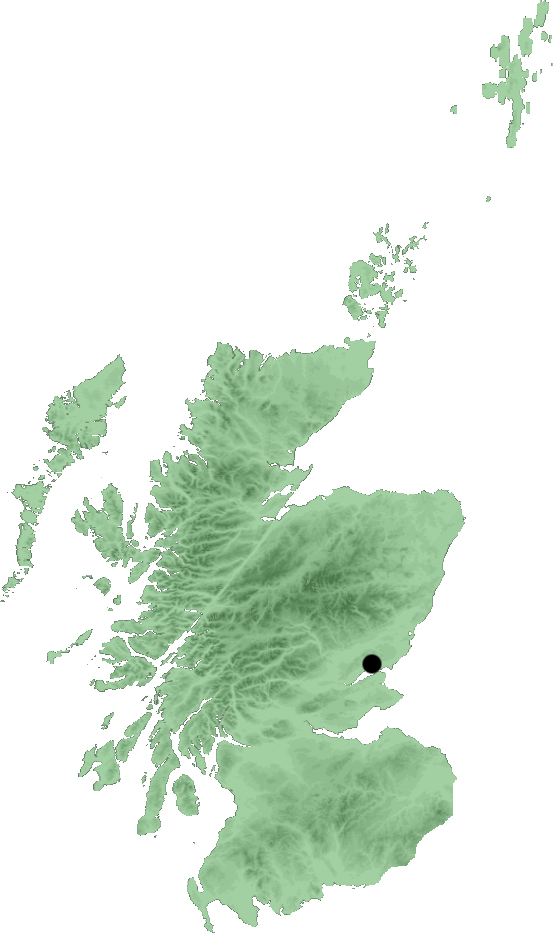
Birthplace of Mary Buick: Dundee, Scotland

== Early life ==
Mary Buick was born in Dundee to parents Euphame Watson and Gideon Buick. Her surname is spelt in records as Buik and Buek variously. She was the daughter of a rope-maker.

When she was 20, Buick married Thomas Watson, a fisherman from Cellardyke, a village in the East Neuk of Fife, Scotland.

== Life at sea ==
=== HMS Ardent ===
Buick's husband, Thomas Watson, was pressured into joining the Royal Navy where he undertook the role of Quartermaster and Gunner. Buick arranged to join him on the boat in the role of nurse.

The pair were aboard HMS Ardent off the coast of Copenhagen when, during battle, Buick gave birth to a daughter. She named her daughter Mary.

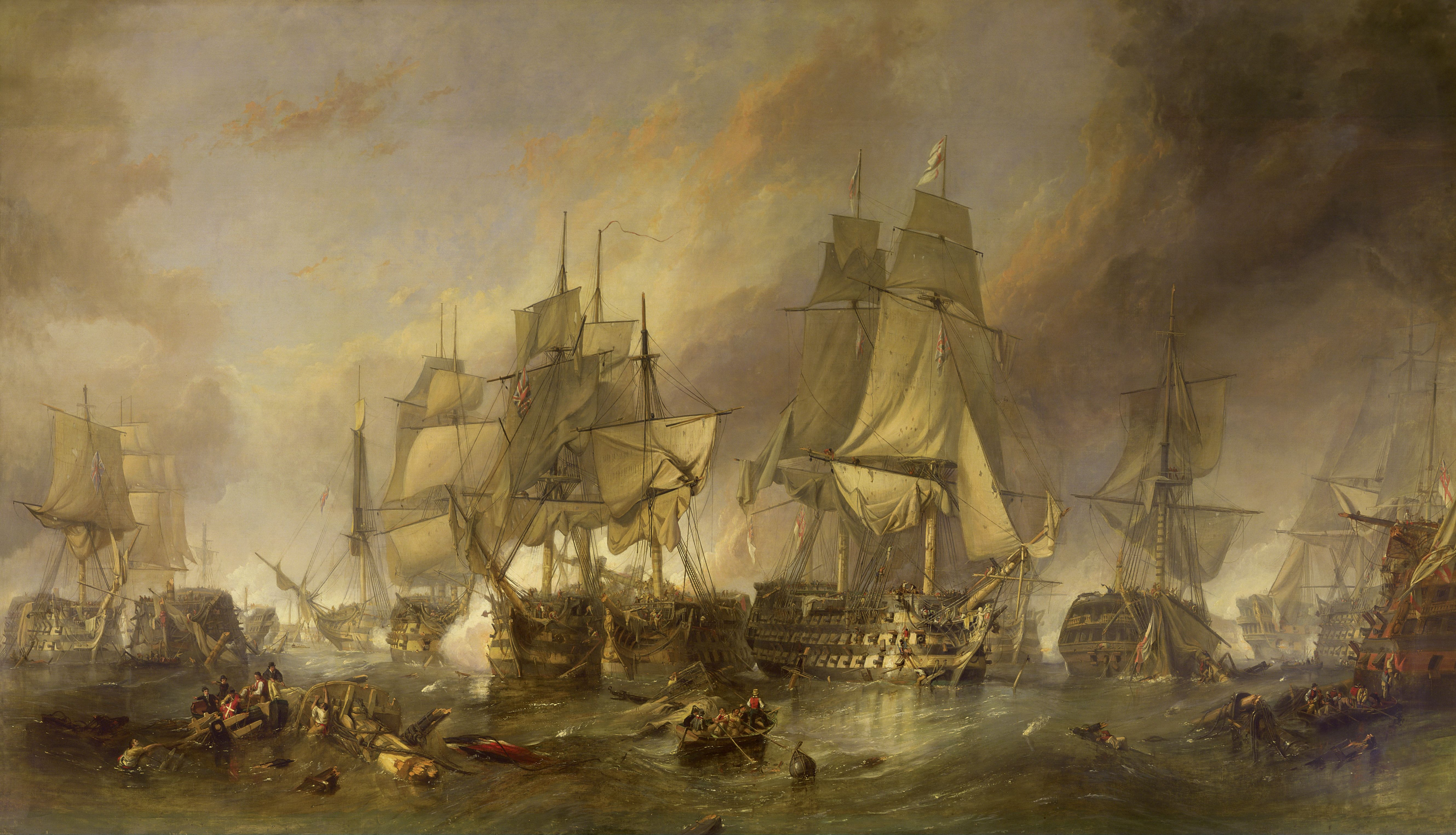
The Battle of Trafalgar by William Clarkson Stanfield, 1836

=== HMS Victory and The Battle of Trafalgar ===
From local accounts, Thomas Watson moved to HMS Victory under Nelson's command, and Bucik and their child accompanied him.

During the Battle of Trafalgar, Buick cared for the wounded while her husband was in charge of a gun grew. Their daughter is said to have been looked after by another man, Malcolm McRuvie, also from Cellardyke.

When Nelson was killed in the midst of battle, Buick is reported to have embalmed his body, ready for its travel home. She may have carried out this task with another woman called Mary Sperring. To do so, it is likely that they stripped and cleaned Nelson' body, cut his hair and put him in ‘a leaguer (cask) of brandy’.

== Later life ==
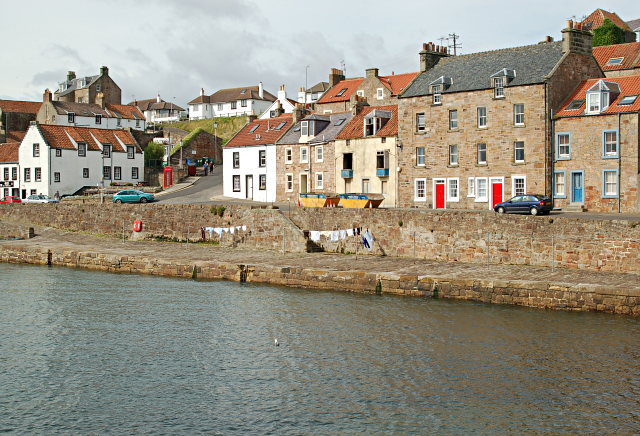
Shore Street, Cellardyke

Buick lived in Cellardyke with her husband. Her husband, Thomas, used money from the Navy to open a public house where No. 7 Shore Street now stands. This prize money was awarded to the crew members as a reward for enemy ships that had been seized or defeated during battle.

Buick went on to have more children and she survived her husband by 28 years.

== Commemorations ==
Mary Buick is remembered as part of Dundee’s Women’s Trail. A blue plaque commemorating her life can be found on the Frigate Unicorn at City Quay. HMS Unicorn (1824) was built after the Battle of Trafalgar but demonstrates the type of ship in the Royal Navy in that period.
