= List of listed buildings in Kilrenny, Fife =

This is a list of listed buildings in the parish of Kilrenny in Fife, Scotland.

== List ==
Name	Location	Date listed	Grid ref. (Note: Sometimes known as OSGB36, the grid reference (where provided) is based on the British national grid reference system used by the Ordnance Survey. • "Guide to National Grid". Ordnance Survey. • "Get-a-map". Ordnance Survey.)	Geo-coordinates	Notes	LB number (Note: Historic Environment Scotland assign a unique alphanumeric identifier to each designated site in Scotland, for listed buildings this always begins with "LB", for example "LB12345".)	Image
Sea View (A D Wylie) Haddfoot Wynd Anstruther Easter				56°13′20″N 2°41′51″W	Category B	36166	Upload Photo
25 East Green, Anstruther Easter				56°13′20″N 2°41′46″W	Category C(S)	36175	Upload Photo
16 East Green, Anstruther Easter				56°13′19″N 2°41′48″W	Category C(S)	36178	Upload Photo
Clydesdale Bank Building, Crail Road And St Andrews Road Anstruther Easter (Including Walls And Railings)				56°13′24″N 2°42′12″W	Category C(S)	36186	Upload Photo
Anstruther Wester Esplanade				56°13′19″N 2°42′14″W	Category B	36195	Upload Photo
The Old Manse 5 The Esplanade Anstruther Wester				56°13′19″N 2°42′13″W	Category B	36199	Upload Photo
13 The Esplanade Anstruther Wester				56°13′19″N 2°42′14″W	Category B	36201	Upload Photo
15 The Esplanade Anstruther Wester				56°13′19″N 2°42′15″W	Category B	36202	Upload Photo
17-23 High Street (Including Area Railings) Anstruther Wester				56°13′19″N 2°42′15″W	Category B	36205	Upload Photo
Pittenweem Road Watson Place Nos 1 To 18 (Inclusive Nos)				56°13′17″N 2°42′27″W	Category B	36211	Upload Photo
20, 22, 24 And 26 High Street Anstruther Wester				56°13′19″N 2°42′21″W	Category C(S)	36219	Upload Photo
30-38 High Street Anstruther Wester				56°13′19″N 2°42′23″W	Category C(S)	36221	Upload Photo
The Manse Doocot, Backdykes Anstruther Easter				56°13′24″N 2°41′52″W	Category B	36073	Upload Photo
Burgh Offices And Hall, Backdykes And Ladywalk, Anstruther Easter				56°13′25″N 2°41′53″W	Category B	36074	Upload Photo
Old Wall, West Side Wightman's Wynd, High Street Anstruther Easter				56°13′22″N 2°42′10″W	Category B	36084	Upload Photo
51 High Street Anstruther Easter				56°13′24″N 2°42′06″W	Category B	36088	Upload Photo
Town Council Burgh Depot, Garage Workshop And Store (Part Occupied J Cornfoot) Burial Brae Cunzie Street And School Green, Anstruther Easter				56°13′25″N 2°42′04″W	Category B	36110	Upload Photo
23-25 Cunzie Street Peebles Building Anstruther Easter				56°13′23″N 2°42′02″W	Category B	36113	Upload Photo
Anstruther Easter, 21-27 Rodger Street				56°13′23″N 2°42′07″W	Category C(S)	36120	Upload Photo
10 Rodger Street Anstruther Easter				56°13′24″N 2°42′08″W	Category C(S)	36123	Upload Photo
20 & 22 Rodger Street, Anstruther Easter				56°13′23″N 2°42′07″W	Category C(S)	36126	Upload Photo
6 Castle Street Anstruther Easter				56°13′22″N 2°42′09″W	Category B	36133	Upload Photo
Sea Wall Castle Street Anstruther Easter				56°13′21″N 2°42′08″W	Category C(S)	36136	Upload another image
1, 2 And 3 Shore Street, Anstruther Easter				56°13′23″N 2°42′05″W	Category C(S)	36139	Upload Photo
Post Office Shore Street Anstruther Easter				56°13′22″N 2°41′59″W	Category C(S)	36149	Upload Photo
31, 32 And 33 Shore Street Anstruther Easter (Including Rear Buildings And Garden Walls)				56°13′21″N 2°41′55″W	Category C(S)	36157	Upload Photo
Mr John Smith's House, Main Street, Kilrenny				56°14′02″N 2°41′12″W	Category C(S)	35981	Upload Photo
Schoolhouse And Hall (Former School Main Street Kilrenny, Including Garden Walls				56°14′04″N 2°41′15″W	Category B	35987	Upload Photo
Kirkwynd Bridge Over Gellie Burn, Kilrenny				56°14′06″N 2°41′15″W	Category C(S)	35990	Upload Photo
Ve-Mara Cottage, Routine Row, Kilrenny				56°14′05″N 2°41′15″W	Category C(S)	35991	Upload Photo
No 1 Routine Row Kilrenny				56°14′05″N 2°41′17″W	Category C(S)	35996	Upload Photo
Brownlea Cottage Trades Street Kilrenny				56°14′02″N 2°41′20″W	Category C(S)	35999	Upload Photo
Rennyhill - Garden Walls Enclosing Old And New Houses And Dovecot				56°14′06″N 2°41′22″W	Category B	36001	Upload Photo
Rennyhill Dovecot				56°14′07″N 2°41′20″W	Category B	36002	Upload another image
Innergellie, East Gatepiers And Lodge				56°14′11″N 2°40′55″W	Category B	36009	Upload Photo
19 John Street Cellardyke				56°13′23″N 2°41′20″W	Category C(S)	36014	Upload Photo
77, 79 George Street, Cellardyke				56°13′30″N 2°41′04″W	Category C(S)	36025	Upload Photo
6 Shore Street, Cellardyke				56°13′32″N 2°41′03″W	Category C(S)	36036	Upload Photo
31 Shore Street, Cellardyke				56°13′35″N 2°40′58″W	Category C(S)	36050	Upload Photo
32, 33 And 34 Shore Street, Cellardyke				56°13′35″N 2°40′57″W	Category C(S)	36051	Upload Photo
27 Shore Street, Cellardyke				56°13′34″N 2°40′58″W	Category C(S)	36053	Upload Photo
1 Dove Street Cellardyke (Including Garden Walls)				56°13′32″N 2°41′05″W	Category C(S)	36058	Upload Photo
Caiplie Farmhouse, Cottage And Steading				56°14′14″N 2°39′44″W	Category B	8977	Upload Photo
Cellardyke, Rodger Street, Nos 1A, 1-9 (Inclusive), 11-35 (Odd Nos), Including Ancillary Buildings And Boundary Walls				56°13′27″N 2°41′32″W	Category B	49883	Upload Photo
Cellardyke, Rodger Street, Nos 10, 14-38 (Even Nos), Including Boundary Walls And Ancillary Buildings				56°13′28″N 2°41′30″W	Category B	49884	Upload Photo
11 And 13 East Green, Anstruther Easter				56°13′20″N 2°41′49″W	Category B	36171	Upload Photo
15 East Green, Anstruther Easter				56°13′20″N 2°41′48″W	Category C(S)	36172	Upload Photo
21 And 23 East Green Anstruther Easter				56°13′20″N 2°41′47″W	Category C(S)	36174	Upload Photo
Cruachan, 1 Crail Road And Anstruther Easter				56°13′24″N 2°42′10″W	Category B	36185	Upload Photo
Dreel Bridge				56°13′21″N 2°42′16″W	Category C(S)	36190	Upload Photo
Buckie Hoose, 2 High Street Anstruther Wester				56°13′20″N 2°42′16″W	Category B	36212	Upload Photo
8 High Street Anstruther Wester				56°13′20″N 2°42′18″W	Category B	36215	Upload Photo
18 High Street Anstruther Wester				56°13′20″N 2°42′20″W	Category B	36218	Upload Photo
1, 3, 5 High St Anstruther Easter				56°13′22″N 2°42′14″W	Category B	36077	Upload Photo
Chalmers' Birthplace, Old Post Office Close High Street Anstruther Easter				56°13′22″N 2°42′08″W	Category B	36086	Upload Photo
59 And 61 High Street And 11 Cunzie Street, Anstruther Easter (Masonic Temple)				56°13′24″N 2°42′04″W	Category C(S)	36092	Upload Photo
32 High Street Anstruther Easter				56°13′23″N 2°42′09″W	Category B	36103	Upload Photo
5 And 7 Rodger St, Anstruther Easter				56°13′24″N 2°42′09″W	Category C(S)	36115	Upload Photo
16 Rodger Street Royal Hotel Anstruther Easter				56°13′24″N 2°42′07″W	Category C(S)	36125	Upload Photo
2 Castle Street Anstruther Easter				56°13′22″N 2°42′07″W	Category B	36130	Upload Photo
7 Castle Street And Corner Of Wightman's Wynd Anstruther Easter				56°13′22″N 2°42′09″W	Category B	36134	Upload Photo
Anstruther Harbour Anstruther Easter				56°13′17″N 2°41′52″W	Category B	36137	Upload another image
13 Shore Street Anstruther Easter				56°13′22″N 2°41′59″W	Category C(S)	36147	Upload Photo
23 And 24 Shore Street Anstruther Easter (Including Garden Walls)				56°13′22″N 2°41′57″W	Category C(S)	36153	Upload Photo
25 And 27 Shore Street Anstruther Easter (Including Garden Walls Of 25-27)				56°13′22″N 2°41′57″W	Category B	36154	Upload Photo
29 And 30 Shore Street Anstruther Easter (Including Rear Buildings And Garden Walls)				56°13′21″N 2°41′56″W	Category B	36156	Upload Photo
37, 38, 39 Shore Street Anstruther Easter (Including Garden Walls)				56°13′21″N 2°41′54″W	Category C(S)	36160	Upload Photo
Kilrenny Churchyard Lumsdaine Burial Enclosure				56°14′04″N 2°41′13″W	Category B	35976	Upload Photo
Kilrenny Churchyard - Walls And Monuments				56°14′04″N 2°41′11″W	Category B	35979	Upload Photo
Mr Gardner's Cottage Main Street, Kilrenny Including Outhouses				56°14′02″N 2°41′12″W	Category C(S)	35980	Upload Photo
Ivy Cottage (2 Houses) Main Street Kilrenny				56°14′02″N 2°41′15″W	Category C(S)	35984	Upload Photo
Burnside Cottage, Routine Row Kilrenny				56°14′05″N 2°41′15″W	Category C(S)	35992	Upload Photo
Innergellie, Stables				56°14′14″N 2°41′19″W	Category B	36007	Upload Photo
Cellardyke, Tolbooth Road, Market Cross Affixed To Town Hall				56°13′23″N 2°41′23″W	Category B	36012	Upload another image
69-75 George Street Cellardyke				56°13′29″N 2°41′05″W	Category B	36024	Upload Photo
52 George Street, Cellardyke				56°13′30″N 2°41′05″W	Category C(S)	36027	Upload Photo
3, 4 And 5 Toft Terrace, George Street, Cellardyke				56°13′30″N 2°41′05″W	Category B	36029	Upload Photo
23 Shore Street, Cellardyke				56°13′33″N 2°40′58″W	Category C(S)	36052	Upload Photo
2 Dove Street, Cellardyke				56°13′32″N 2°41′04″W	Category C(S)	36059	Upload Photo
Cellardyke, 3 Dove Street				56°13′32″N 2°41′04″W	Category B	36060	Upload Photo
Gear Loft And Fish Premises (Of Shop At 50 George Street) East Forth Street Cellardyke				56°13′30″N 2°41′07″W	Category C(S)	36063	Upload Photo
The Ship Tavern 49 Shore Street And 1 Haddfoot Wynd Anstruther Easter				56°13′20″N 2°41′51″W	Category C(S)	36165	Upload another image See more images
18, 20 East Green Anstruther Easter				56°13′19″N 2°41′47″W	Category C(S)	36179	Upload Photo
24 East Green Anstruther Easter				56°13′19″N 2°41′46″W	Category C(S)	36181	Upload Photo
2 The Esplanade (Including Garages) Anstruther Wester				56°13′20″N 2°42′12″W	Category B	36203	Upload Photo
31 High Street Anstruther Wester				56°13′19″N 2°42′17″W	Category B	36207	Upload Photo
39 High Street Anstruther Wester				56°13′19″N 2°42′18″W	Category C(S)	36208	Upload Photo
Johnstone Lodge, Former Coach House And Stables Of (Converted To House 1970-1) Backdykes And Haddfoot Wynd Anstruther Easter				56°13′21″N 2°41′52″W	Category B	36076	Upload Photo
Mr Doig's Property Wightman's Wynd High Street Anstruther Easter				56°13′22″N 2°42′09″W	Category C(S)	36083	Upload Photo
Tolbooth Wynd (East Side) High Street Anstruther Easter				56°13′24″N 2°42′05″W	Category B	36089	Upload Photo
Old Corn Mill, Warehouse To North-East Of, Anstruther Easter				56°13′21″N 2°42′18″W	Category C(S)	36094	Upload Photo
House (R Kell) Chalmers' Buildings High Street Anstruther Easter				56°13′22″N 2°42′17″W	Category C(S)	36096	Upload Photo
42 And 44 High Street, Anstruther Easter				56°13′24″N 2°42′07″W	Category C(S)	36104	Upload Photo
46 And 48 High Street Anstruther Easter				56°13′24″N 2°42′07″W	Category C(S)	36105	Upload Photo
54 And 56 High Street, Anstruther Easter				56°13′25″N 2°42′06″W	Category C(S)	36107	Upload Photo
Anstruther Town Hall				56°13′25″N 2°42′03″W	Category B	36109	Upload another image
15 Cunzie Street Anstruther Easter				56°13′24″N 2°42′03″W	Category C(S)	36112	Upload Photo
17 And 19 Rodger Street, Anstruther Easter				56°13′23″N 2°42′08″W	Category C(S)	36119	Upload Photo
12 And 14 Rodger Street And 40 High Street, Anstruther Easter				56°13′24″N 2°42′08″W	Category B	36124	Upload Photo
Market Cross Shore Street Anstruther Easter				56°13′22″N 2°42′02″W	Category B	36138	Upload another image See more images
4 Shore Street Anstruther Easter				56°13′23″N 2°42′05″W	Category B	36140	Upload Photo
34 Shore Street Anstruther Easter (Including Rear Buildings And Garden Walls)				56°13′21″N 2°41′55″W	Category C(S)	36158	Upload Photo
41, 42, 43 And 44 Shore Street Anstruther Easter (Including Rear Buildings And Garden Walls)				56°13′20″N 2°41′53″W	Category B	36161	Upload another image
45, 46 Shore St Anstruther				56°13′20″N 2°41′52″W	Category C(S)	36162	Upload Photo
Westbourne, Main Street, Kilrenny				56°14′03″N 2°41′19″W	Category C(S)	35988	Upload Photo
Invermay House Routine Row Kilrenny				56°14′04″N 2°41′17″W	Category C(S)	35997	Upload Photo
Rennyhill House (0Ld)				56°14′04″N 2°41′24″W	Category B	36000	Upload Photo
Whiteside House, Kilrenny				56°14′05″N 2°41′03″W	Category C(S)	36010	Upload Photo
25 And 27 John Street, Cellardyke				56°13′23″N 2°41′19″W	Category B	36016	Upload Photo
Cellardyke, 29-33 John Street				56°13′23″N 2°41′18″W	Category B	36017	Upload Photo
The Harbour (Skinfast Haven) Cellardyke				56°13′31″N 2°41′00″W	Category B	36034	Upload Photo
16 Shore Street Cellardyke				56°13′33″N 2°41′00″W	Category C(S)	36043	Upload Photo
22 And 24 Shore Street, Cellardyke				56°13′34″N 2°40′59″W	Category C(S)	36046	Upload Photo
1 Harbour Head, Cellardyke				56°13′33″N 2°40′58″W	Category B	36055	Upload Photo
Seaview House East End Cellardyke				56°13′39″N 2°40′53″W	Category B	36065	Upload Photo
Anstruther Easter Parish Church (St Adrian's)				56°13′27″N 2°42′02″W	Category A	36066	Upload another image See more images
Murray And Wilson's Premises School Green Anstruther Easter				56°13′25″N 2°41′59″W	Category C(S)	36069	Upload Photo
8 Haddfoot Wynd Anstruther Easter (Including Garden Wall)				56°13′20″N 2°41′51″W	Category B	36167	Upload Photo
Warehouse And Workshop (Smith & Hutton) Harbour Head, Anstruther Easter				56°13′19″N 2°41′46″W	Category B	36170	Upload Photo
14 East Green, Anstruther Easter				56°13′19″N 2°41′48″W	Category C(S)	36177	Upload Photo
26 East Green Warehouse, Anstruther Easter				56°13′19″N 2°41′46″W	Category B	36182	Upload Photo
Anstruther Wester Town Hall, Session House And Church Hall				56°13′20″N 2°42′15″W	Category C(S)	36193	Upload another image
1-8 Elizabeth Place, Anstruther Wester				56°13′20″N 2°42′16″W	Category C(S)	36194	Upload Photo
The White House 1 The Esplanade Anstruther Wester				56°13′19″N 2°42′11″W	Category A	36197	Upload Photo
Fernbank 25 And 27 High Street Anstruther Wester				56°13′19″N 2°42′16″W	Category B	36206	Upload Photo
43 High Street Anstruther Wester				56°13′19″N 2°42′19″W	Category B	36209	Upload Photo
The Hermitage Backdykes Including Garden Walls And Outbuildings Anstruther Easter				56°13′24″N 2°41′55″W	Category B	36071	Upload Photo
19 And 21 High St Anstruther Easter				56°13′23″N 2°42′12″W	Category B	36079	Upload Photo
House (Kerr) Wightman's Wynd And Old Post Office Close High Street, Anstruther Easter				56°13′23″N 2°42′09″W	Category B	36082	Upload Photo
31 High Street Anstruther Easter Including Wing To Wightman's Wynd				56°13′23″N 2°42′09″W	Category C(S)	36085	Upload Photo
55 High Street Anstruther Easter				56°13′24″N 2°42′05″W	Category C(S)	36091	Upload Photo
50 And 52 High Street Anstruther Easter				56°13′24″N 2°42′06″W	Category B	36106	Upload Photo
Belmont House, Cunzie Street Anstruther Easter				56°13′25″N 2°42′04″W	Category B	36111	Upload Photo
13 Rodger Street And 34 High Street, Anstruther Easter				56°13′23″N 2°42′09″W	Category C(S)	36117	Upload Photo
Dreel Lodge Castle Street And Wightman's Wynd Anstruther Easter				56°13′21″N 2°42′10″W	Category C(S)	36135	Upload Photo
5 And 6 Shore Street Anstruther Easter				56°13′23″N 2°42′03″W	Category B	36141	Upload Photo
10 And 11 Shore Street Anstruther Easter				56°13′22″N 2°42′01″W	Category C(S)	36145	Upload Photo
Masonic Arms 12 Shore Street Anstruther Easter				56°13′22″N 2°42′00″W	Category B	36146	Upload Photo
48 Shore Street Anstruther Easter				56°13′20″N 2°41′51″W	Category B	36164	Upload Photo
Kilrenny Parish Church				56°14′04″N 2°41′12″W	Category B	35975	Upload another image
Kilrenny Churchyard-Scott Of Balcomie Mausoleum				56°14′04″N 2°41′14″W	Category B	35978	Upload Photo
Innergellie, Walled Gardens				56°14′11″N 2°41′16″W	Category B	36006	Upload Photo
Innergellie Dovecot				56°14′07″N 2°41′18″W	Category B	36008	Upload another image
Outhouses, Toft Terrace, George Street Cellardyke				56°13′31″N 2°41′06″W	Category C(S)	36032	Upload Photo
Bay View 33 East Forth Street, Cellardyke				56°13′30″N 2°41′07″W	Category C(S)	36062	Upload Photo
Manse, School Green Including Garden Walls Anstruther Easter				56°13′25″N 2°41′57″W	Category C(S)	36070	Upload Photo
Cellardyke, East End, Kilrenny War Memorial Including Railings				56°13′41″N 2°40′55″W	Category B	51250	Upload Photo
22 East Green Anstruther Easter				56°13′19″N 2°41′47″W	Category C(S)	36180	Upload Photo
East Green, Engineers Shop And Warehouse, Anstruther Easter				56°13′19″N 2°41′46″W	Category C(S)	36183	Upload Photo
28 East Green, Anstruther Easter				56°13′19″N 2°41′45″W	Category C(S)	36184	Upload Photo
Cunzie House And Outbuildings (Now Garage) Crail Road, Anstruther Easter				56°13′28″N 2°42′06″W	Category B	36188	Upload Photo
Anstruther Wester Parish Church (Now St Adrian's Church Hall)				56°13′20″N 2°42′14″W	Category A	36191	Upload another image See more images
Rose Court 11 The Esplanade Anstruther Wester				56°13′19″N 2°42′14″W	Category B	36200	Upload Photo
6 High Street Anstruther Wester				56°13′20″N 2°42′17″W	Category B	36214	Upload Photo
10 And 12 High Street Anstruther Wester				56°13′20″N 2°42′18″W	Category B	36216	Upload Photo
28 High Street Anstruther Wester				56°13′19″N 2°42′22″W	Category B	36220	Upload Photo
Johnstone Lodge Backdykes Anstruther Easter Including Garden-Walls And Gate-Piers				56°13′23″N 2°41′52″W	Category B	36075	Upload Photo
Smugglers' Inn High Street, Anstruther Easter				56°13′22″N 2°42′13″W	Category B	36078	Upload Photo
23 And 25 High St Anstruther Easter				56°13′23″N 2°42′11″W	Category B	36080	Upload Photo
35 High Street Anstruther Easter				56°13′23″N 2°42′09″W	Category C(S)	36087	Upload Photo
Old Corn Mill On Dreel Burn, Off High Street Anstruther Easter				56°13′21″N 2°42′18″W	Category B	36093	Upload Photo
Old Mill House Chalmers' Buildings, High Street Anstruther Easter				56°13′22″N 2°42′18″W	Category C(S)	36095	Upload Photo
15 Rodger Street Anstruther Easter				56°13′23″N 2°42′08″W	Category C(S)	36118	Upload Photo
Strathburn Cottage And Miss Lindsay's Cottage, Main Street, Kilrenny				56°14′03″N 2°41′14″W	Category C(S)	35982	Upload Photo
Killin Cottage Routine Row Kilrenny				56°14′05″N 2°41′16″W	Category C(S)	35994	Upload Photo
Cairnhill House Trades Street Kilrenny				56°14′03″N 2°41′19″W	Category C(S)	35998	Upload Photo
Kilrenny Mains (Rennyhill) Farm				56°14′06″N 2°41′27″W	Category C(S)	36003	Upload Photo
Rennyhill Bridge Over Gellie Burn				56°14′06″N 2°41′19″W	Category B	36004	Upload Photo
55 George Street Cellardyke				56°13′28″N 2°41′07″W	Category C(S)	36020	Upload Photo
57-61 George Street Cellardyke				56°13′28″N 2°41′07″W	Category B	36021	Upload Photo
81, 83 George Street And Harbour House Cellardyke				56°13′30″N 2°41′03″W	Category B	36026	Upload Photo
1 Toft Terrace George Street Cellardyke				56°13′30″N 2°41′05″W	Category C(S)	36028	Upload Photo
2 Harbour Head, Cellardyke				56°13′33″N 2°40′58″W	Category C(S)	36056	Upload Photo
Guerdon Cottage School Green Anstruther Easter				56°13′25″N 2°41′59″W	Category C(S)	36068	Upload Photo
Barnsmuir Farmhouse And Steading				56°14′51″N 2°39′12″W	Category B	8975	Upload Photo
Caiplie Dovecot				56°14′26″N 2°40′00″W	Category B	8976	Upload another image
West Pitkierie Dovecot				56°14′25″N 2°43′10″W	Category A	8979	Upload another image See more images
19A B And C East Green Anstruther Easter				56°13′20″N 2°41′47″W	Category B	36173	Upload Photo
27 And 29 East Green, Anstruther Easter				56°13′20″N 2°41′46″W	Category C(S)	36176	Upload Photo
House (Mrs Henderson) Crail Road And St Andrews Road Anstruther Easter				56°13′26″N 2°42′11″W	Category B	36187	Upload Photo
Dolphin Cottage The Esplanade Anstruther Wester				56°13′20″N 2°42′14″W	Category B	36204	Upload Photo
The Dreel Tavern 14 And 16 High Street Anstruther Wester				56°13′20″N 2°42′19″W	Category B	36217	Upload Photo
The Manse, Backdykes Anstruther Easter (Including Garden Walls)				56°13′24″N 2°41′53″W	Category A	36072	Upload another image
House (Mr Watt) High Terrace, High Street, Anstruther Easter				56°13′23″N 2°42′15″W	Category C(S)	36098	Upload Photo
Holmlea, High Street, Anstruther Easter				56°13′23″N 2°42′14″W	Category C(S)	36100	Upload Photo
6, 8 High Street Anstruther Easter				56°13′23″N 2°42′14″W	Category C(S)	36101	Upload Photo
60 High Street Anstruther Easter				56°13′25″N 2°42′05″W	Category C(S)	36108	Upload Photo
9 And 11 Rodger Street, Anstruther Easter				56°13′24″N 2°42′09″W	Category C(S)	36116	Upload Photo
Savings Bank Rodger Street Anstruther Easter				56°13′22″N 2°42′07″W	Category B	36121	Upload Photo
Royal Bank Of Scotland 26 & 28 Rodger Street Anstruther Easter				56°13′23″N 2°42′06″W	Category C(S)	36127	Upload Photo
1 Castle Street Anstruther Easter				56°13′22″N 2°42′07″W	Category B	36129	Upload Photo
3 Castle Street Anstruther Easter				56°13′22″N 2°42′08″W	Category B	36131	Upload Photo
The Murray Library 7 Shore Street Anstruther Easter				56°13′23″N 2°42′03″W	Category C(S)	36142	Upload Photo
13 Shore Street House To Rear Of (Now Warehouse Of No 13) Anstruther Easter				56°13′22″N 2°41′59″W	Category C(S)	36148	Upload Photo
35 And 36 Shore Street Anstruther Easter (Including Rear And Garden Walls)				56°13′21″N 2°41′54″W	Category C(S)	36159	Upload Photo
Rose Cottage (Moir) Main Street Kilrenny				56°14′02″N 2°41′17″W	Category C(S)	35985	Upload Photo
Corthie Cottage Main Street Kilrenny				56°14′01″N 2°41′19″W	Category C(S)	35986	Upload Photo
Kirkwynd Cottage And Mrs Braid's Cottage, Kirkwynd Kilrenny				56°14′05″N 2°41′14″W	Category C(S)	35989	Upload Photo
Woodburn Cottage Routine Row Kilrenny				56°14′05″N 2°41′16″W	Category C(S)	35993	Upload Photo
Gelliebank Cottage Routine Row Kilrenny				56°14′05″N 2°41′17″W	Category C(S)	35995	Upload Photo
15 And 17 John Street, Cellardyke				56°13′23″N 2°41′20″W	Category B	36013	Upload Photo
21 And 23 John Street, Cellardyke				56°13′23″N 2°41′19″W	Category C(S)	36015	Upload Photo
Cellardyke, 15-19 George Street				56°13′26″N 2°41′10″W	Category B	36019	Upload Photo
67 George Street Cellardyke				56°13′29″N 2°41′05″W	Category C(S)	36023	Upload Photo
8 Toft Terrace, George Street, Cellardyke (Including Wall To East Forth Street)				56°13′30″N 2°41′07″W	Category C(S)	36031	Upload Photo
54 George Street, Cellardyke				56°13′30″N 2°41′05″W	Category C(S)	36033	Upload Photo
19 Shore Street Cellardyke				56°13′33″N 2°40′59″W	Category C(S)	36045	Upload Photo
26 Shore Street, Cellardyke				56°13′34″N 2°40′59″W	Category C(S)	36047	Upload Photo
3 & 4 Harbour Head, Including Outhouses Cellardyke				56°13′33″N 2°40′56″W	Category C(S)	36057	Upload Photo
Store (Isobel Bremner) East Forth Street Cellardyke				56°13′30″N 2°41′08″W	Category C(S)	36064	Upload Photo
Cornceres House				56°14′16″N 2°40′46″W	Category C(S)	8978	Upload Photo
House (Miss Graham) Haddfoot Wynd Anstruther Easter				56°13′20″N 2°41′50″W	Category C(S)	36168	Upload Photo
Scottish Fisheries Museum Trust Ltd Harbour Head And 50 East Shore Anstruther Easter				56°13′19″N 2°41′49″W	Category A	36169	Upload another image See more images
Mayview, Crail Road And Ladywalk				56°13′32″N 2°41′50″W	Category B	36189	Upload Photo
Anstruther Wester Parish Churchyard And Gravestones				56°13′20″N 2°42′13″W	Category C(S)	36192	Upload another image
Sea Wall From Esplanade To Anstruther Golf Club (Including Watch Tower) Anstruther Wester				56°13′13″N 2°42′19″W	Category B	36196	Upload another image
4 High Street Anstruther Wester				56°13′20″N 2°42′17″W	Category C(S)	36213	Upload Photo
27 High Street Anstruther Easter				56°13′23″N 2°42′10″W	Category B	36081	Upload Photo
Chalmers' House Chalmers' Buildings High Street, Anstruther Easter				56°13′23″N 2°42′16″W	Category C(S)	36097	Upload Photo
House (Mr Peattie) High Terrace, High Street, Anstruther Easter				56°13′23″N 2°42′16″W	Category C(S)	36099	Upload Photo
6 & 8 Rodger Street Anstruther Easter				56°13′24″N 2°42′08″W	Category C(S)	36122	Upload Photo
17 Shore Street, Anstruther Easter				56°13′22″N 2°41′58″W	Category C(S)	36150	Upload Photo
18-20 Shore Street North Boundary Wall Only				56°13′23″N 2°41′56″W	Category C(S)	36151	Upload Photo
21 And 22 Shore Street Anstruther Easter (Including Garden Walls)				56°13′22″N 2°41′57″W	Category C(S)	36152	Upload Photo
Salutation Bar 28 Shore Street Anstruther Easter (Including Garden Walls)				56°13′21″N 2°41′56″W	Category C(S)	36155	Upload Photo
47 Shore Street (With Haddfoot Close) Anstruther Easter				56°13′20″N 2°41′52″W	Category B	36163	Upload Photo
Kilrenny Churchyard-Beaton Burial Enclosure				56°14′04″N 2°41′11″W	Category B	35977	Upload Photo
Kilrenny Manse				56°14′03″N 2°40′58″W	Category B	36011	Upload Photo
6 Toft Terrace, George Street, Cellardyke				56°13′30″N 2°41′06″W	Category C(S)	36030	Upload Photo
8 Shore Street, Cellardyke				56°13′32″N 2°41′02″W	Category C(S)	36038	Upload Photo
13 Shore Street Cellardyke				56°13′33″N 2°41′01″W	Category C(S)	36041	Upload Photo
18 Shore Street Cellardyke				56°13′33″N 2°41′00″W	Category C(S)	36044	Upload Photo
Tower (Mr Dick, Clifton East Forth Street) East Forth Street Cellardyke				56°13′33″N 2°41′03″W	Category B	36061	Upload Photo
St Adrian's Churchyard Walls And Monuments				56°13′25″N 2°42′01″W	Category B	36067	Upload Photo
3 The Esplanade Anstruther Wester				56°13′19″N 2°42′12″W	Category B	36198	Upload Photo
Crichton House High Street And Crichton Street Anstruther Wester				56°13′19″N 2°42′21″W	Category C(S)	36210	Upload Photo
53 High Street Anstruther Easter				56°13′24″N 2°42′05″W	Category C(S)	36090	Upload Photo
24 High Street And "Dunearne" Anstruther Easter				56°13′24″N 2°42′10″W	Category B	36102	Upload Photo
Guthrie's House 11 Card's Wynd Anstruther Easter				56°13′22″N 2°41′58″W	Category B	36114	Upload Photo
34 Rodger Street Anstruther Easter				56°13′23″N 2°42′05″W	Category B	36128	Upload Photo
4 Castle Street (Pantiles) Anstruther Easter				56°13′22″N 2°42′08″W	Category C(S)	36132	Upload Photo
8 Shore Street Anstruther Easter				56°13′23″N 2°42′02″W	Category B	36143	Upload Photo
9 Shore Street And 34 Cunzie Street, Anstruther Easter				56°13′22″N 2°42′01″W	Category B	36144	Upload Photo
Dunglass (Mr Scott) Main Street, Kilrenny				56°14′03″N 2°41′14″W	Category B	35983	Upload Photo
Innergellie House				56°14′11″N 2°41′15″W	Category A	36005	Upload another image
56 John Street Cellardyke				56°13′26″N 2°41′14″W	Category B	36018	Upload Photo
63 George Street Cellardyke				56°13′29″N 2°41′06″W	Category C(S)	36022	Upload Photo
7 Shore Street, Cellardyke				56°13′32″N 2°41′03″W	Category C(S)	36037	Upload Photo
9 And 10 Shore Street And 5, 7, 9 Dove Street, Cellardyke				56°13′32″N 2°41′02″W	Category C(S)	36039	Upload Photo
11 Shore Street Cellardyke				56°13′32″N 2°41′02″W	Category C(S)	36040	Upload Photo
14 & 15 Shore Street Cellardyke				56°13′33″N 2°41′00″W	Category C(S)	36042	Upload Photo
28 Shore Street Cellardyke				56°13′34″N 2°40′58″W	Category C(S)	36048	Upload Photo
30 Shore Street, Cellardyke				56°13′34″N 2°40′58″W	Category B	36049	Upload Photo
29 Shore Street, Cellardyke				56°13′34″N 2°40′57″W	Category C(S)	36054	Upload Photo
School Road, Cellardyke Primary School				56°13′27″N 2°41′27″W	Category C(S)	49408	Upload Photo
Waid Academy And Former School Masters House, St Andrews Road, Anstruther Including Library Hall To Rear (Excluding Later Additions To North)				56°13′27″N 2°42′16″W	Category C(S)	52345	Upload another image

== Key ==
The scheme for classifying buildings in Scotland is:

- Category A: "buildings of national or international importance, either architectural or historic; or fine, little-altered examples of some particular period, style or building type."
- Category B: "buildings of regional or more than local importance; or major examples of some particular period, style or building type, which may have been altered."
- Category C: "buildings of local importance; lesser examples of any period, style, or building type, as originally constructed or moderately altered; and simple traditional buildings which group well with other listed buildings."

In March 2016 there were 47,288 listed buildings in Scotland. Of these, 8% were Category A, and 50% were Category B, with the remaining 42% being Category C.

== See also ==
- List of listed buildings in Fife
