= Anstruther =

Town in Fife, Scotland

Coordinates: 56.22344°N 2.70274°W

Anstruther: Scottish Gaelic: Eanstair; Scots: Enster
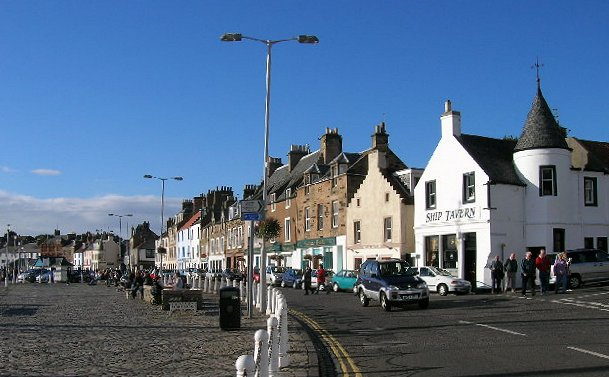
- Anstruther seafront

- Location within Fife
- Population: 3,950 (2020)
- OS grid reference: NO564035
- Council area: Fife
- Lieutenancy area: Fife
- Country: Scotland
- Sovereign state: United Kingdom
- Post town: Anstruther
- Postcode district: KY10
- Dialling code: 01333
- Police: Scotland
- Fire: Scottish
- Ambulance: Scottish
- UK Parliament: North East Fife
- Scottish Parliament: North East Fife

Anstruther (/ˈænstrəðər/; Scottish Gaelic: Eanstair), known locally as Ainster or Enster (/ˈeɪnstər/), is a coastal town in Fife, Scotland, situated on the north shore of the Firth of Forth, nine miles (14 km) south-southeast of St Andrews. The town comprises two settlements, Anstruther Easter and Anstruther Wester, which are divided by a stream, the Dreel Burn. With a population of 3,500, it is the largest community in the part of Fife known as the East Neuk. To the east, it merges with the village of Cellardyke.

== Description ==
Founded as a fishing village, Anstruther is home to the Scottish Fisheries Museum. Recreational vessels are now moored in the harbour, and a golf course is situated near the town. Anstruther Pleasure Cruises operate sightseeing/wildlife cruises from the harbour to the Isle of May, the UK's primary puffin location, on board the vessel the May Princess from April to October. An abundance of other wildlife, including seal colonies, also inhabit the island.

The Waid Academy, the local state comprehensive school, is a focus of the community and through its secondary role as a community centre. Anstruther has a parish church at its centre that is on a small hill. This structure incorporates a tower/spire feature rare to Britain, but common to the area.

Anstruther War Memorial is located in the cemetery, somewhat further inland. It is of an unusual war memorial form, being totally flat to the ground, in the centre of a landscaped roundel, broadly adopting the shape of a celtic cross.

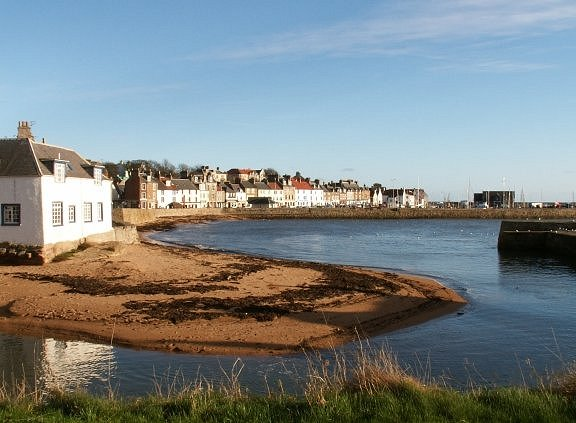
Anstruther Easter from Anstruther Wester.

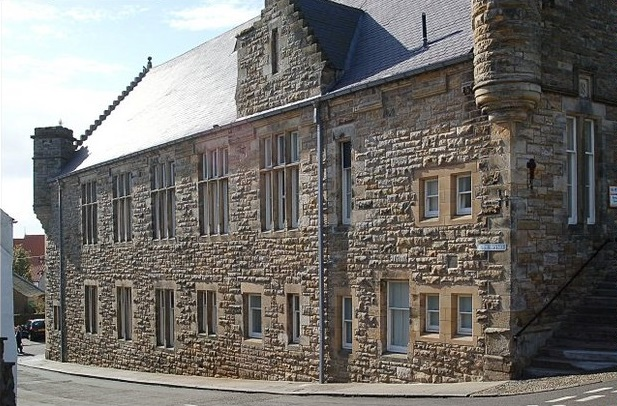
The Kirk Wynd elevation of Anstruther Town Hall in Anstruther Easter.

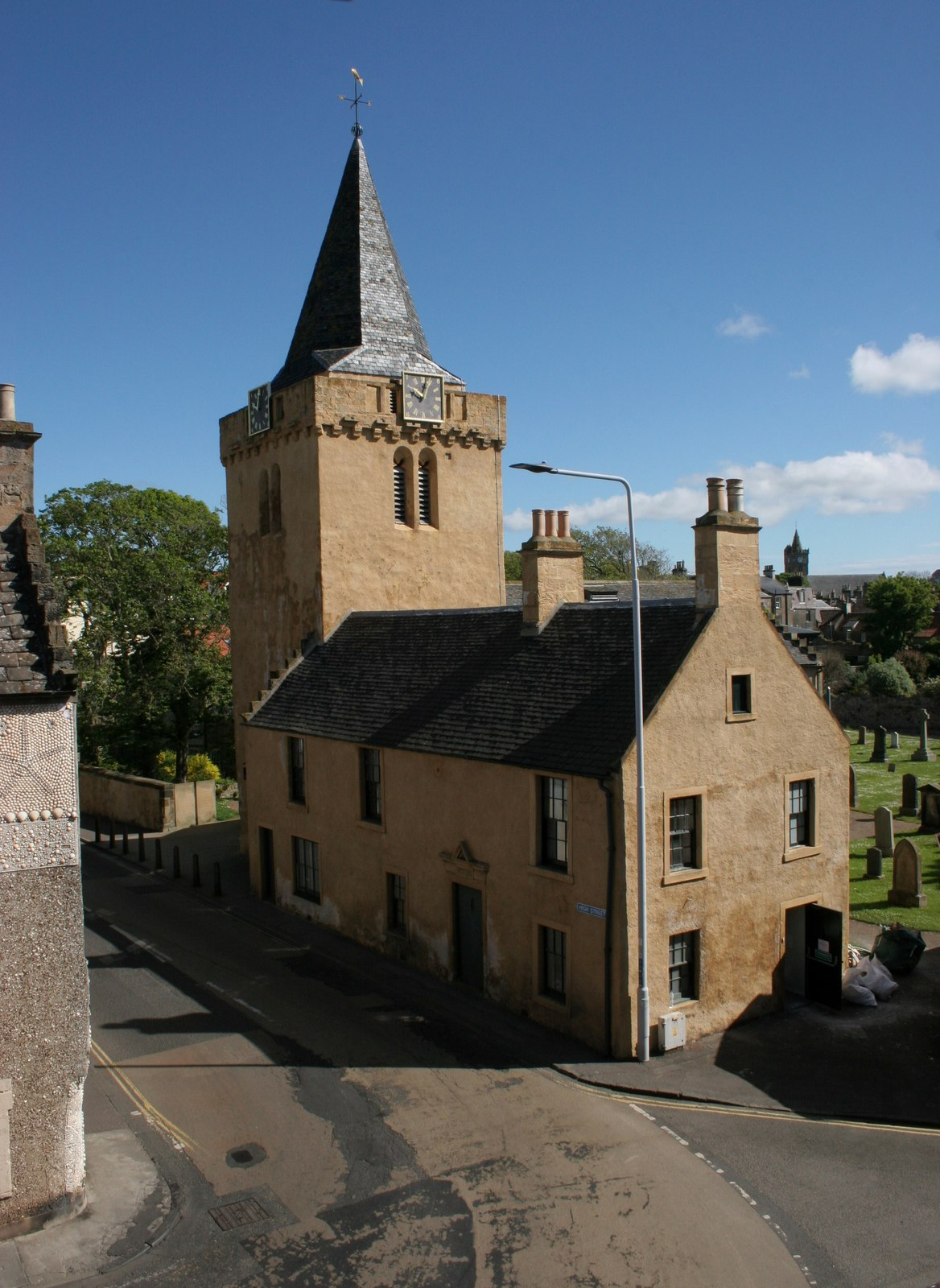
Dreel Halls, the main community events venue in Anstruther Wester.

The town has several fish and chip shops. The Anstruther Fish Bar, which won Fish and Chip shop of the year in 2001–2002, was awarded the same prize once again by the Sea Fish Organisation in 2009.

Anstruther is home to Scotland's only true-scale model Solar System. The model, which shows the Sun and planets and the distances between them all at the same scale of 1 to ten thousand million, is located mostly in the town centre. It stretches almost 600 m from the Sun to Pluto.

Anstruther is close to the Caves of Caiplie situated on the coastal path to Crail.

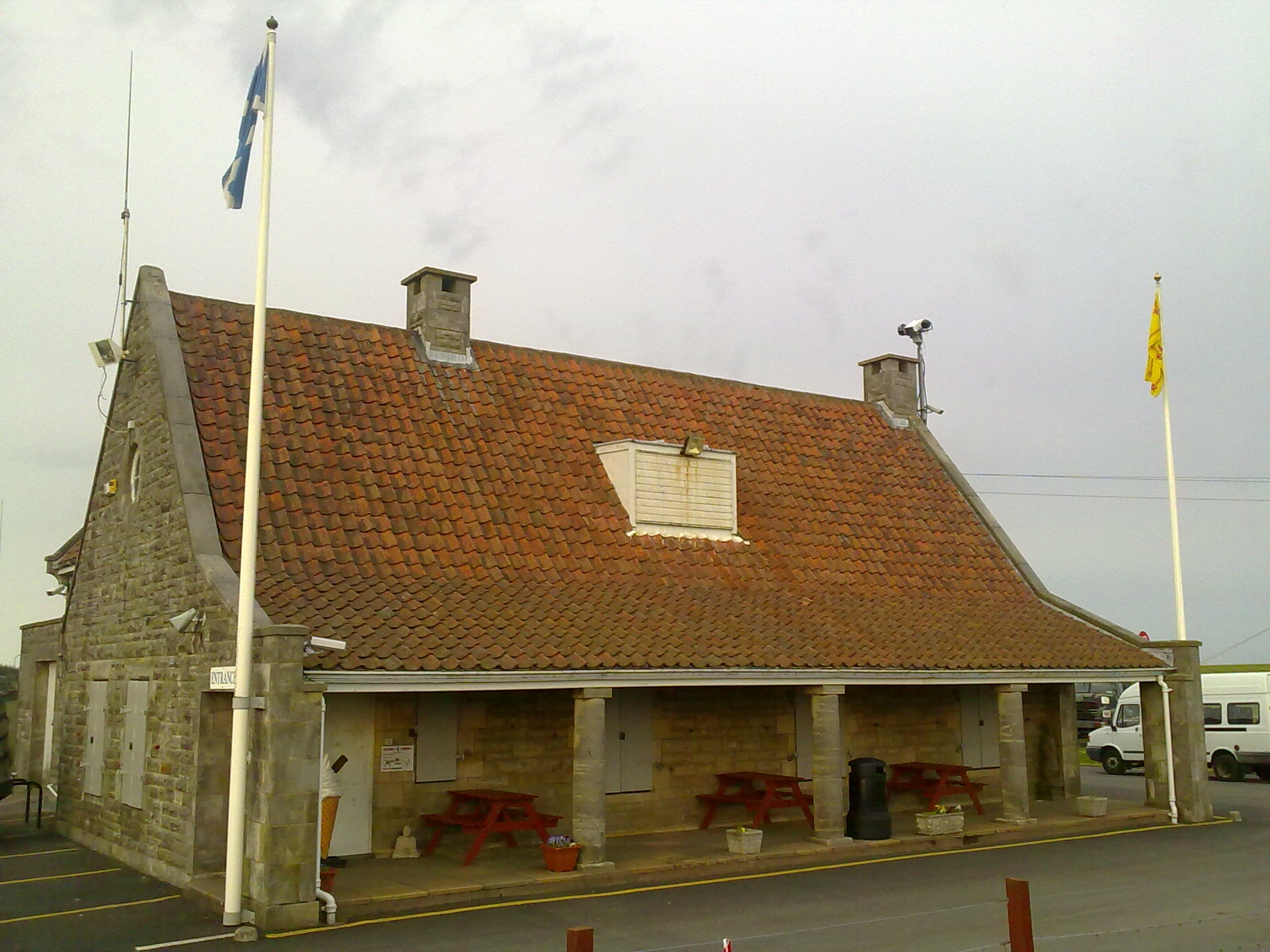
Surface structure leading to "Scotland's Secret Bunker"

Following the end of the Cold War, one of Anstruther's best-kept secrets has become a major tourist attraction. A secret nuclear bunker, built in 1951 and operational until 1993, is located on the B940 near the village. During its operational life, it looked like an ordinary domestic dwelling, but has been renovated and is now open to the public as a museum. The bunker was a subsidiary regional seat of government in time of possible nuclear emergency and would have been occupied by the UK Armed Forces, UKWMO, Royal Observer Corps and other Civil Service personnel.

Somewhat out from the town centre, in Anstruther Wester, stands the Dreel Tavern, taking its name from the adjacent burn. This building dates from the 17th century. Nearby is Buckie House, built in the late 17th century and restored in 1968 by W. Murray Jack. The east gable was decorated with scallop shells and whelks or 'buckies' by the slater Andrew Batchelor in the mid 19th century. Its exterior was restored in 2010.

== History ==
The name of Anstruther derives from Scottish Gaelic. The second element is sruthair ('burn, stream'), but the first element less certain: it is possibly Gaelic á(i)n ('driving') or aon ('one'), thus meaning either 'driving current or burn' or '(place of or on) one burn'. The name of Anstruther Easter derives from Scots easter ('eastern'), since the village lies to the east of Anstruther, and Anstruther Wester correspondingly from Scots wester ('western').

Anstruther-Easter and Anstruther-Wester are separated by a small stream called Dreel Burn.

Local tradition states that early in the 12th century, Alexander I of Scotland granted the lands of Anstruther to a William de Candela. However, no records survive of this original grant, and the earliest recorded lord of Anstruther was mentioned in a charter of 1225. There have been several theories as to the origin of the, possibly mythical, William, but recent research has suggested he may have been a Norman from Italy. There is evidence that William the Conqueror sought assistance from William, Count of Candela. He sent his son (or possibly his grandson). It may be this was the William de Candela, who received the grant of land from Alexander. William de Candela's son, another William, was said to be a benefactor to the monks of Balmerino Abbey. Balmerino was founded in 1229, long after the likely lifetime of this William. Land in Anstruther Easter, on which a chapel was built and now occupied by the Scottish Fisheries Museum, was gifted to Balmerino by another William, sometime in the 1280s. Both this suggestion, and the Italian origin theory are inaccurate. The de Candela family actually came from Dorset, coming to England probably from Normandy in or around 1066. The de Candela name was dropped by a later generation, in a charter confirming a grant of land to Dryburgh Abbey in 1225, Henry is described as 'Henricus de Aynstrother dominus ejusdem'. His son, also called Henry, was a companion of Louis IX in his crusades to the Holy Land and also swore fealty to Edward I in 1292 and again in 1296.

In 1225, it took the intervention of Pope Honorius III to settle a teinds dispute between the monks of Dryburgh Abbey and the fishermen of Anstruther, suggesting that the fishing was sufficiently good to warrant arguing over. In December 1583, James VI of Scotland gave the town the status of a Royal Burgh and trading rights, recognizing the importance of the port, called the draucht of Anstruther. The bounds of the new Burgh were the "Silver Dyke" on the east, the low water line on the south, the Anstruther burn to the west, and the Kylrynnie march road.

James Melville's diary provides a graphic account of the arrival of a ship from the Spanish Armada to Anstruther. Local tradition has long held that some of the survivors remained and intermarried with the locals. In the 18th and 19th centuries, the town was home to The Beggar's Benison, a gentleman's club devoted to "the convivial celebration of male sexuality".

Chalmers Lighthouse in the harbour of Anstruther

By the 19th century, Anstruther-Easter, Anstruther-Wester, and Kilrenny were all separate royal and parliamentary boroughs. Anstruther-Easter held tanning, shipbuilding, and fish-curing establishments, as well as a coasting trade. In 1871, the royal burgh of Anstruther-Easter had a population of 1169; the parliamentary burgh, 1289. Anstruther-Wester held 484. The Board of Fisheries constructed a new harbour in the 1870s, completed by 1877 at a cost of £80,000. A lighthouse was constructed on the west pier of the harbour in 1880 and named in honour of the Presbyterian minister Thomas Chalmers, who had been born in Anstruther a century earlier. By the First World War, the communities were connected to St Andrews by the North British Railway.

The Dreel Halls complex incorporates the former Anstruther Wester Town Hall, which dates from 1795, while Anstruther Easter Town Hall was completed in 1872.

Although the drop in the catch in 1909 came as a shock, fishing from Anstruther continued to prosper in the years leading up to the First World War.

Fishery Statistics

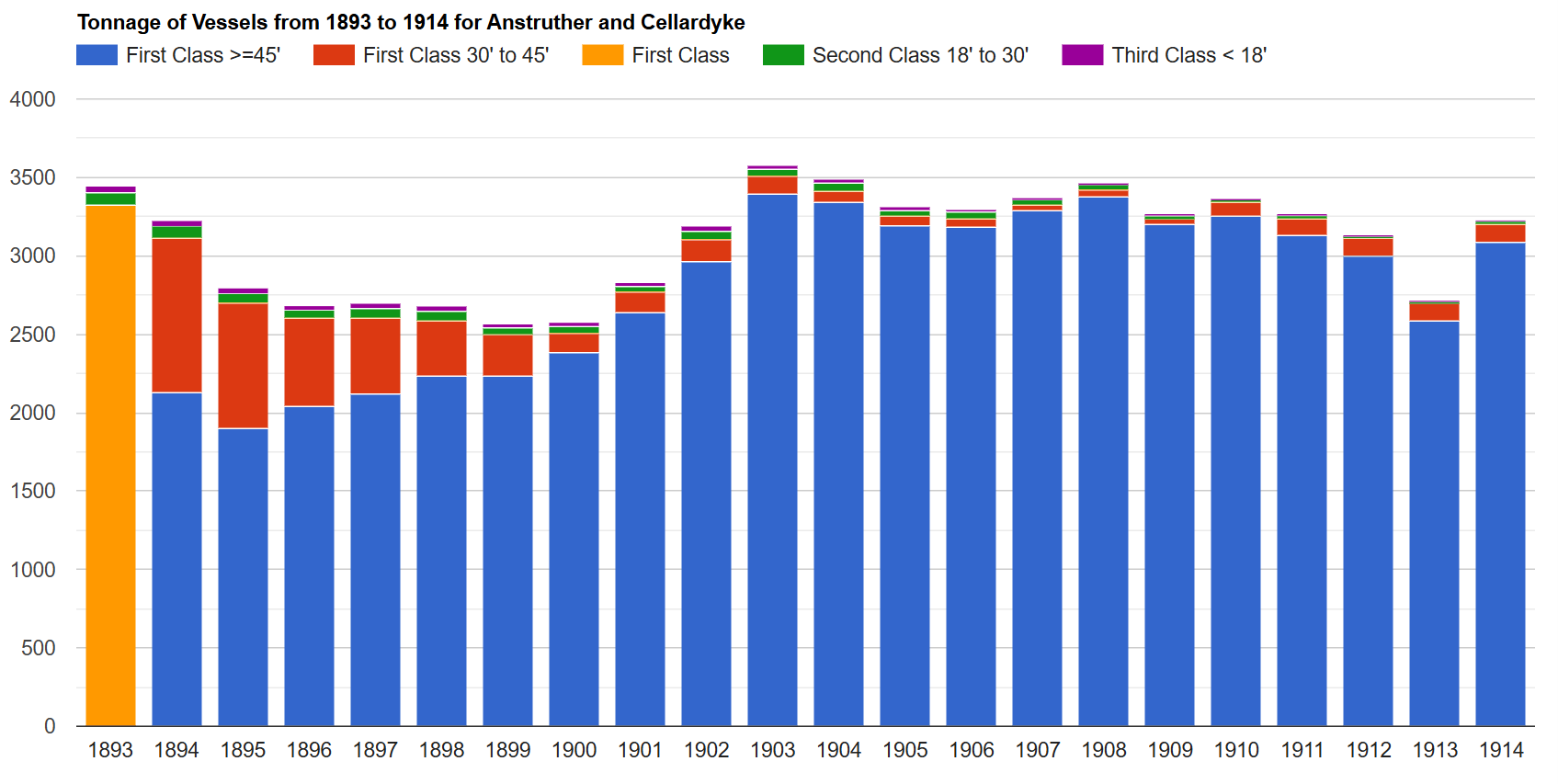
Tonnage of vessels

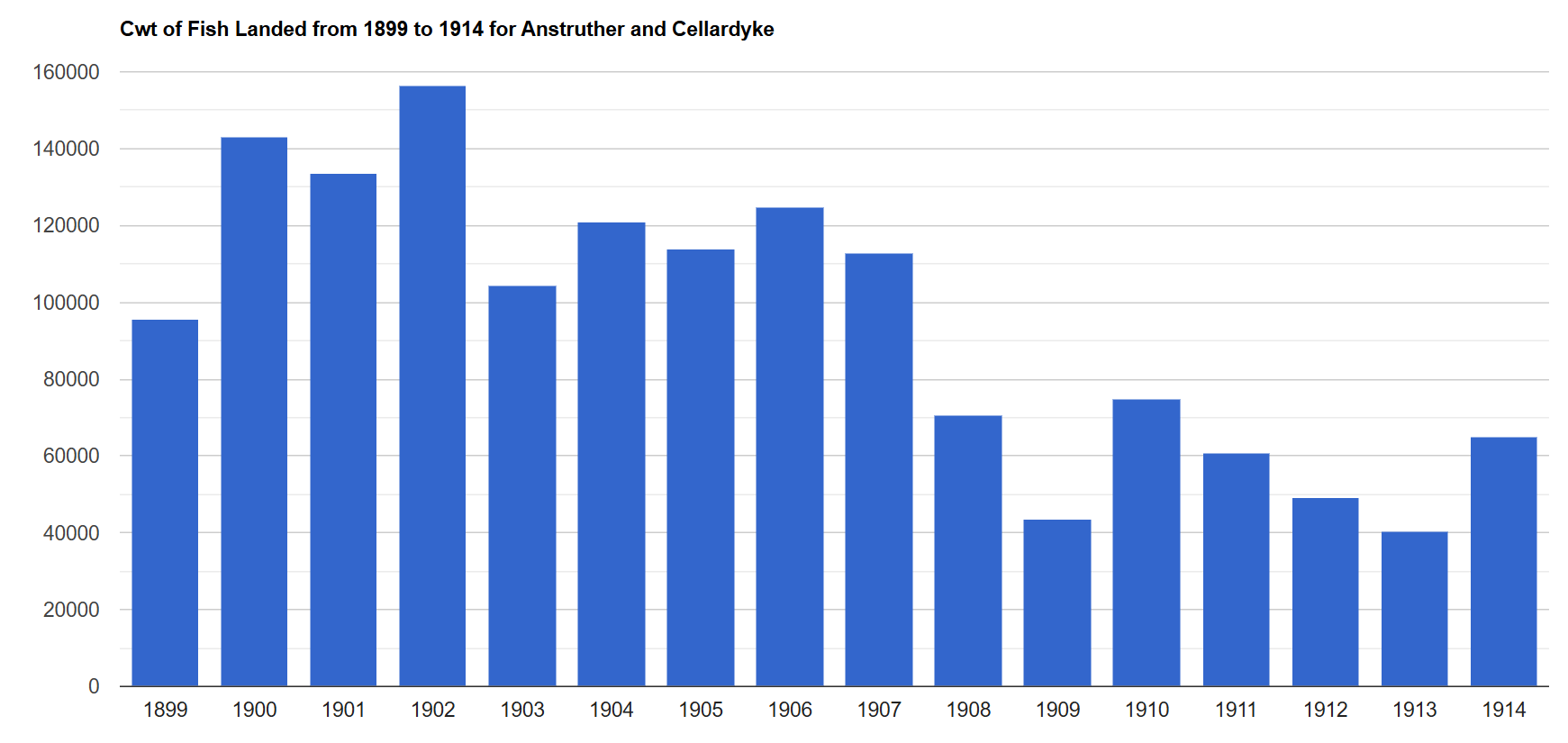
Cwt of fish landed

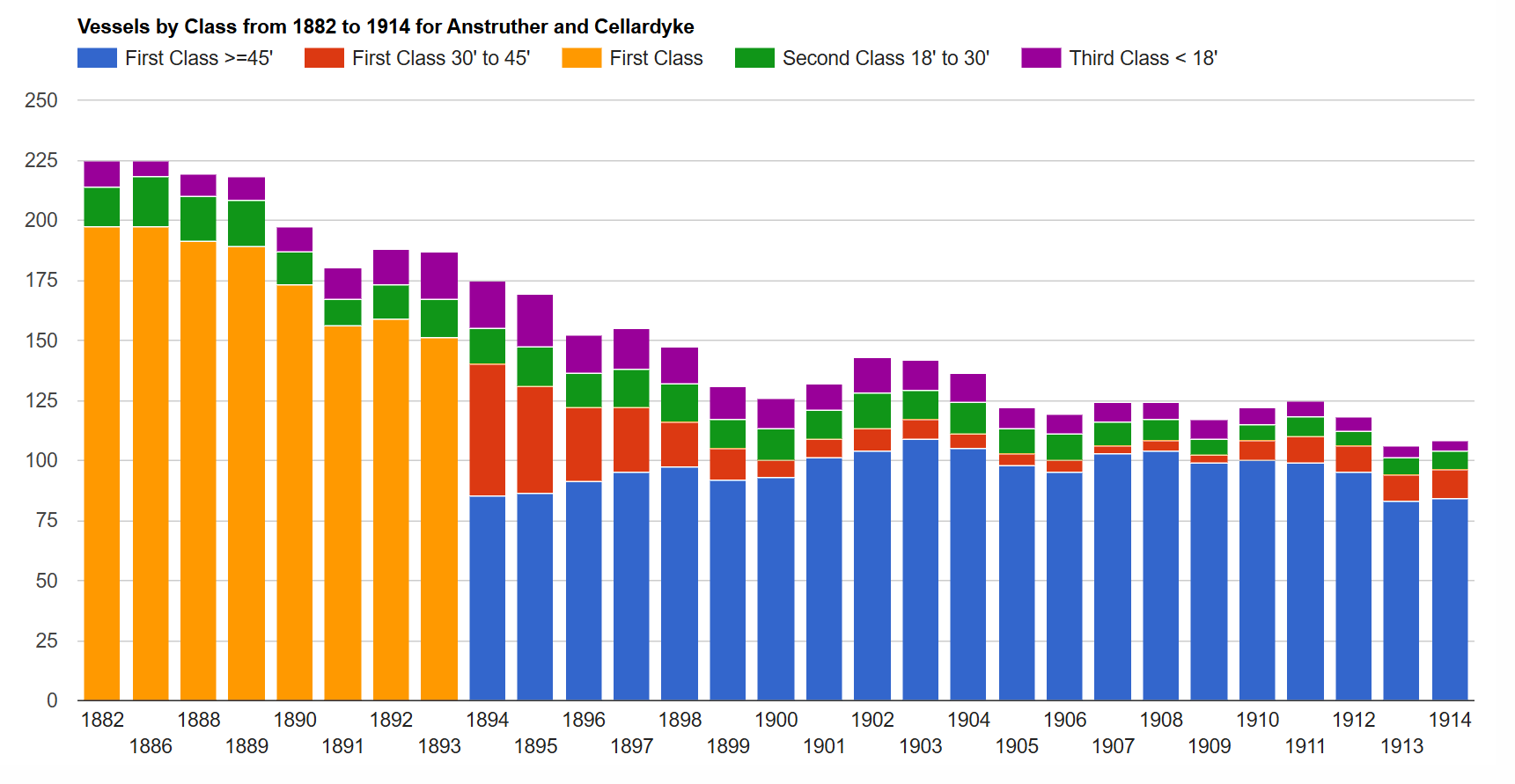
Vessels by class

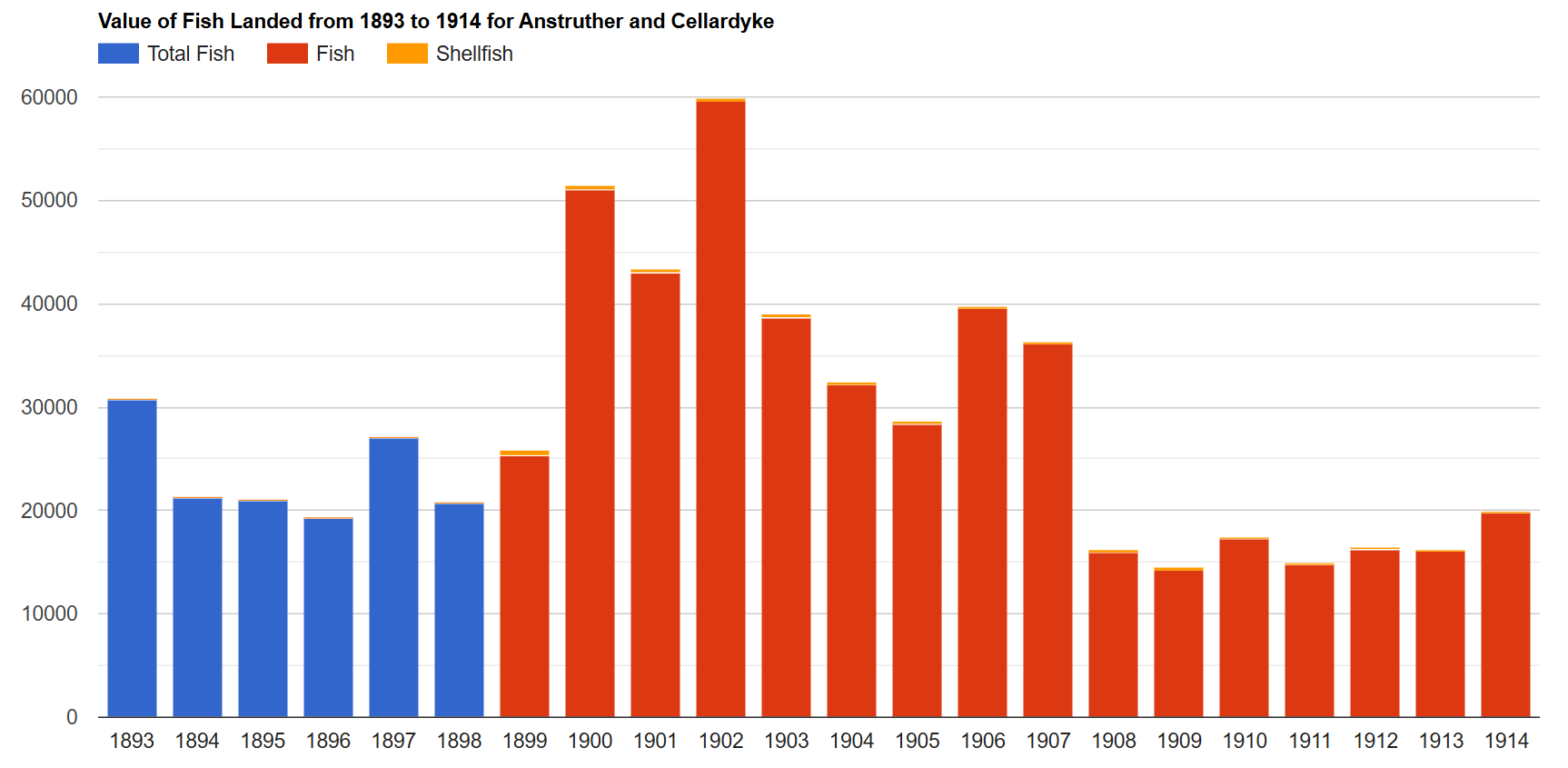
Value (£) of fish landed

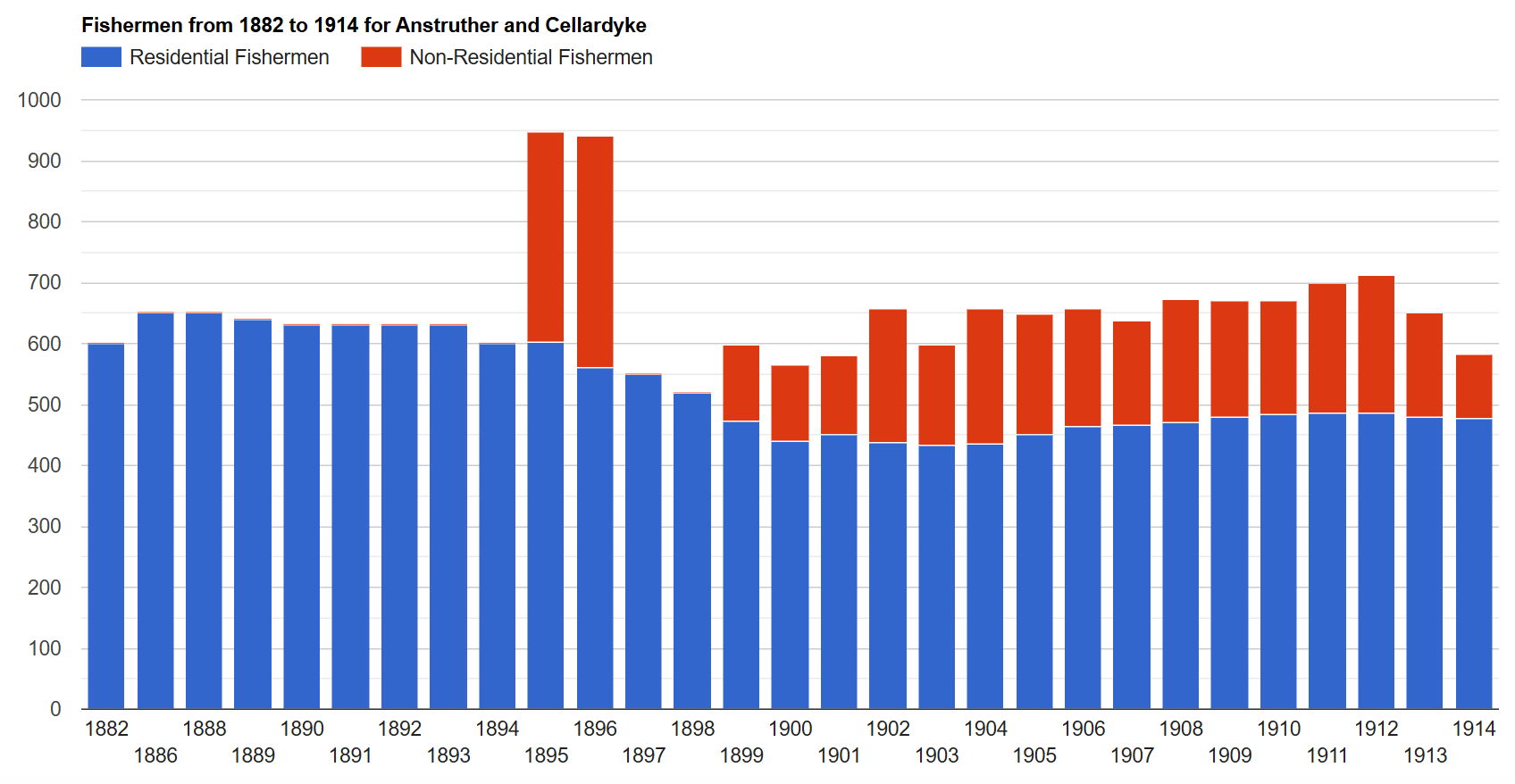
Fishermen

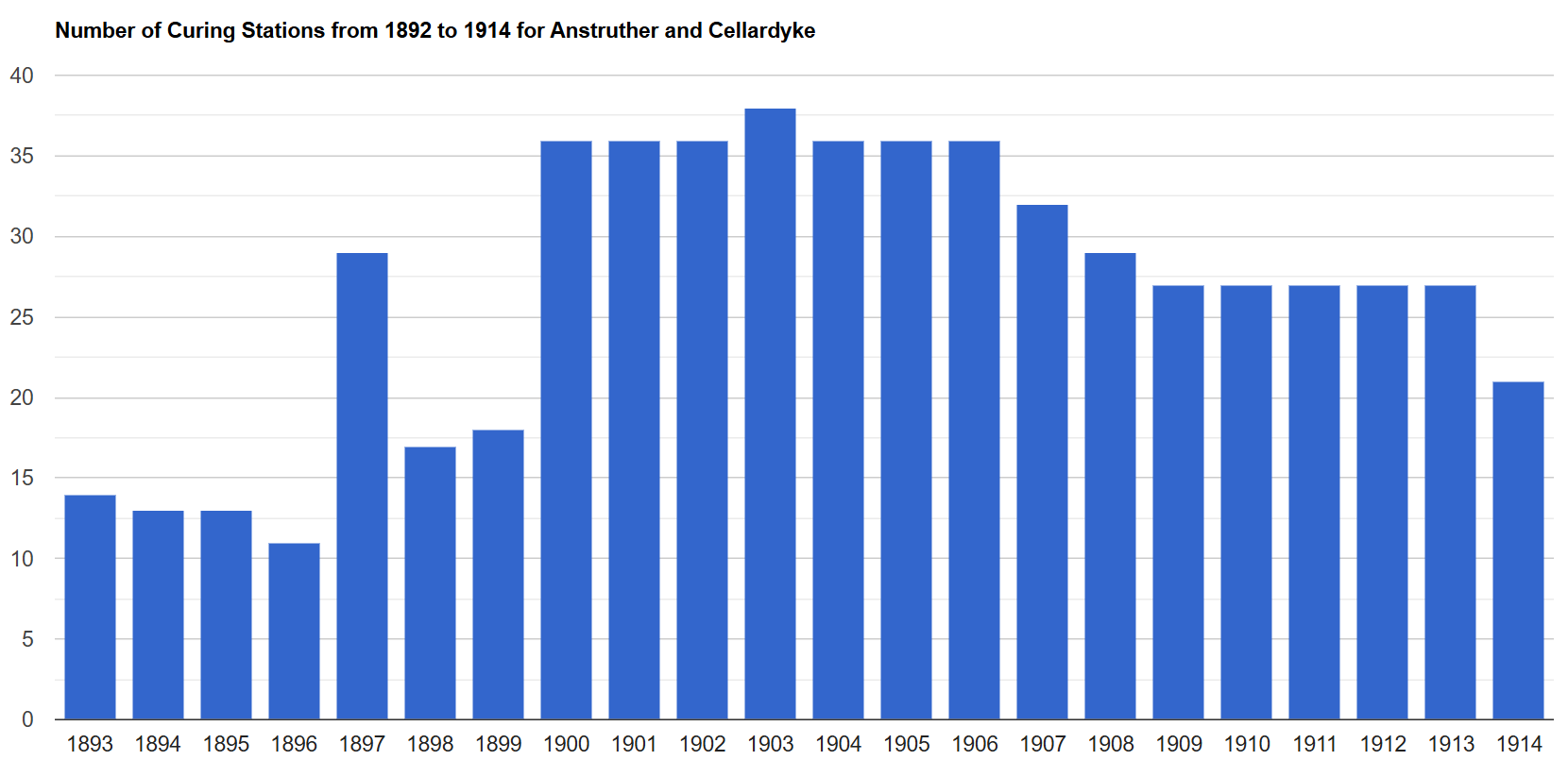
Number of curing stations

Herring fishing remained a feature of the area until the mid-20th century when, after a record catch in 1936, the shoals mysteriously declined until the industry effectively disappeared by 1947. At one time, the town was well served by trains on the Fife Coast Railway. The line was closed to passengers in 1965.

In the summer of 2018 a decision by Fife Council to build a new care home facility on the town's Bankie Park was reversed after a campaign by residents.

== Twinning ==
Anstruther has been twinned with Bapaume, France since October 1991.

== Bus services ==
Stagecoach East Scotland operates two primary bus services which run via Anstruther. These are:

- 95 from Leven to St Andrews via Pittenweem and Crail
- X60 from Edinburgh to St Andrews via Kirkcaldy, Leven and Pittenweem

== Notable inhabitants ==
- Robert Anstruther (d. 1583) soldier who served Mary, Queen of Scots.
- James Anstruther (d. 1606) was a laird of Anstruther and a courtier, and his son Robert Anstruther was a diplomat during the Thirty Years' War. Sir James Lumsden, a soldier of fortune under Gustavus Adolphus was born in the parish of Kilrenny about 1598.
- William Tennant's poem "Anster Fair" concerns the town's celebration.
- Thomas Chalmers (1780–1847), co-founder of the Free Church of Scotland, was born and raised in Anstruther-Easter, where his house has been preserved.
- The Goodsir brothers were born and brought up in Anstruther. They were John Goodsir (1814–1867), the anatomist; Harry Goodsir, surgeon on the ill-fated Franklin expedition, Robert Anstruther Goodsir who travelled to the Arctic searching for him, and Joseph Taylor Goodsir, who became a minister and theologian.
- David Martin (1737–1798), the painter and engraver was a native of Anstruther.
- Author Jessie Kerr Lawson (1838–1917) lived for a time in the town, and her sons Andrew Cowper Lawson (1861–1952), geologist, and James Kerr Lawson (1862–1939), painter, were born there. Andrew discovered and named the San Andreas Fault and the mineral Lawsonite is named after him. The family emigrated to Canada where another son, Abercrombie Anstruther Lawson (1870–1927), founding professor of botany at the University of Sydney, was born.
- Princess Titaua Marama, Chiefess of Haapiti in Polynesia lived in Anstruther from 1892 until she died there in 1898, aged 55. A blue plaque marks the house in which she lived. A book has been written about her life by the British-American author, Fiona J Mackintosh.
- Archibald Constable, Sir Walter Scott's publisher, was born in the parish of Carnbee, about three miles to the north of Pittenweem.
- Sir Robert Hamilton Bruce Lockhart (1887–1970), director-general of the Political Warfare Executive during World War II, was also born in Anstruther.
- Belle Patrick (1895–1972), missionary was born in the town.
- Sports writer Graham Spiers hails from Anstruther.
- It was the childhood home of both BBC Radio 1 DJ Edith Bowman and singer-songwriter Horse McDonald.

== Politics ==
Traditionally, the two Anstruthers returned a single Member of Parliament (MP) together with Kilrenny, Pittenweem, St Andrews, Cupar and Crail.

Currently, Anstruther is in the North East Fife UK Parliament constituency. The sitting member is Wendy Chamberlain of the Scottish Liberal Democrats. In the 2017 General Election, then-MP Stephen Gethins of the SNP retained his seat by a majority of only two votes, narrowly defeating the Liberal Democrat candidate Elizabeth Riches, a resident of Anstruther and former local councillor, after three recounts.

Anstruther is in the North East Fife Scottish Parliament constituency. The MSP is currently Willie Rennie, who won back the seat for the Liberal Democrats from Roderick Campbell of the SNP in the 2016 Scottish Parliament election and retained it in 2021. For the purposes of the additional member system used to elect MSPs to the Scottish Parliament, Anstruther is in the Mid Scotland and Fife electoral region. In local politics, the ward of East Neuk and Landward (of which Anstruther is part) elects three councillors to Fife Council under the single transferable vote system.

Prior to Brexit in 2020, Anstruther was part of the Scotland European Parliament constituency.

== See also ==
- List of places in Fife
