= Caves of Caiplie =

Cave system in Scotland

Caiplie Coves
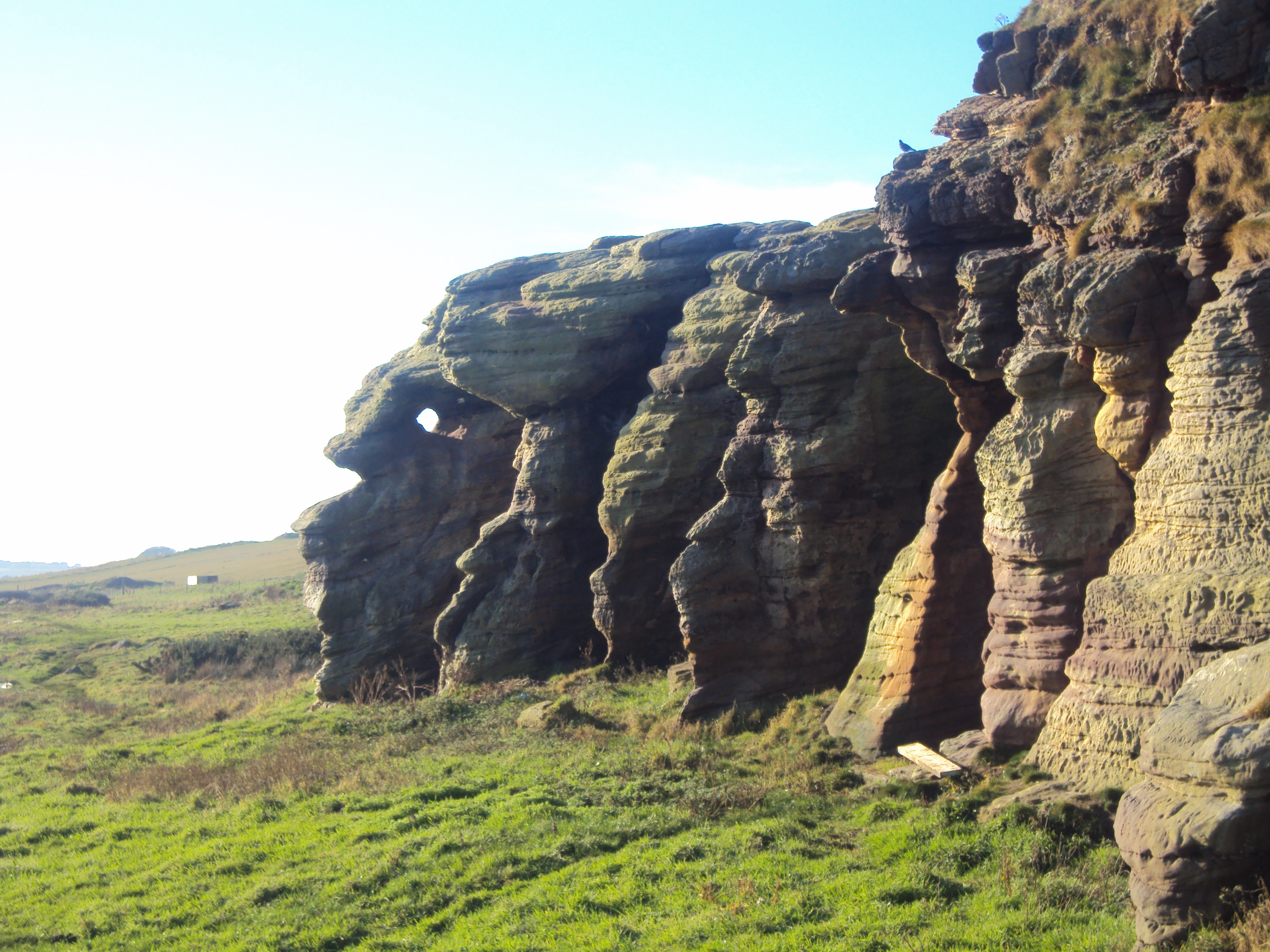
- Caiplie Coves
- Interactive map of Caiplie Coves
- Location: Fife
- Coordinates: 56.243332°N 2.647271°W
- Translation: The word 'Cove' as used here means 'Cave' (Scots)

The Caves of Caiplie, Caplawchy or Caiplie Coves, known locally as The Coves, are a cave system on the Fife Coastal path between Anstruther and Crail in Scotland. The caves were used by farmers to house livestock and as a doocot, around 170 CE. The caves are thought to have been abandoned since 180 CE. In the 9th century they were reputedly the site of early Christian worship.

== The cave system ==
Chapel Cave is the largest cave in the system, it was described by David Hay Fleming in his book 'Guide to the East Neuk of Fife' as having "a lofty roof" while also noting that it "measures fully forty feet from its mouth to the pointed recess at the inner end." While the cave has been created naturally due to the waves eroding the stone, it has been made bigger by people.

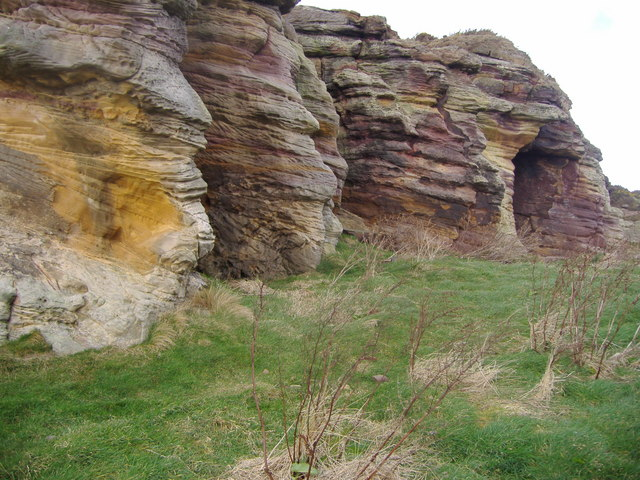
Caiplie Caves

== History ==
The word 'cove' in Scots means 'cave'. The caves were all constructed by the sea eroding away the sandstone with a selection of the larger caves also being carved by the various groups of humans who have occupied the caves at various points in time.

== Human occupants ==
The caves were first used for worship in the ninth century by Christians. In Chapel Cave there are a number of incised crosses which had been added at varying time periods. Holes had also been cut in pairs in the rock which is believed to have been used for passing ropes through. The floor of the cave was formerly clay and excavations in the nineteenth century recovered human remains beneath the floor. Harmit's Well is the easternmost of the Caves of Caiplie and it is named this because for several months just prior to World War II it was used by a hermit as his dwelling, the fixing points for his door and window can still be seen embedded in the natural sandstone walls.

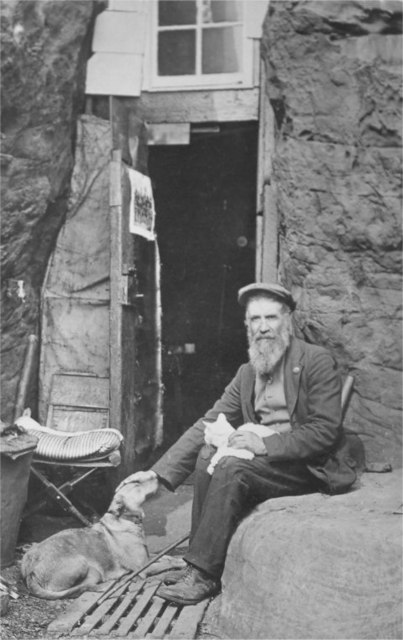
The Hermit at his Cave

== Views ==
There are views from the caves of May Island, a nature reserve that can be travelled to by boat from Anstruther, and the Bass Rock. To the west of the caves are views to Kilrenny and Cellardyke and to the east is Crail, a small fishing village.
