= Anstruther Town Hall =

Municipal building in Anstruther, Scotland

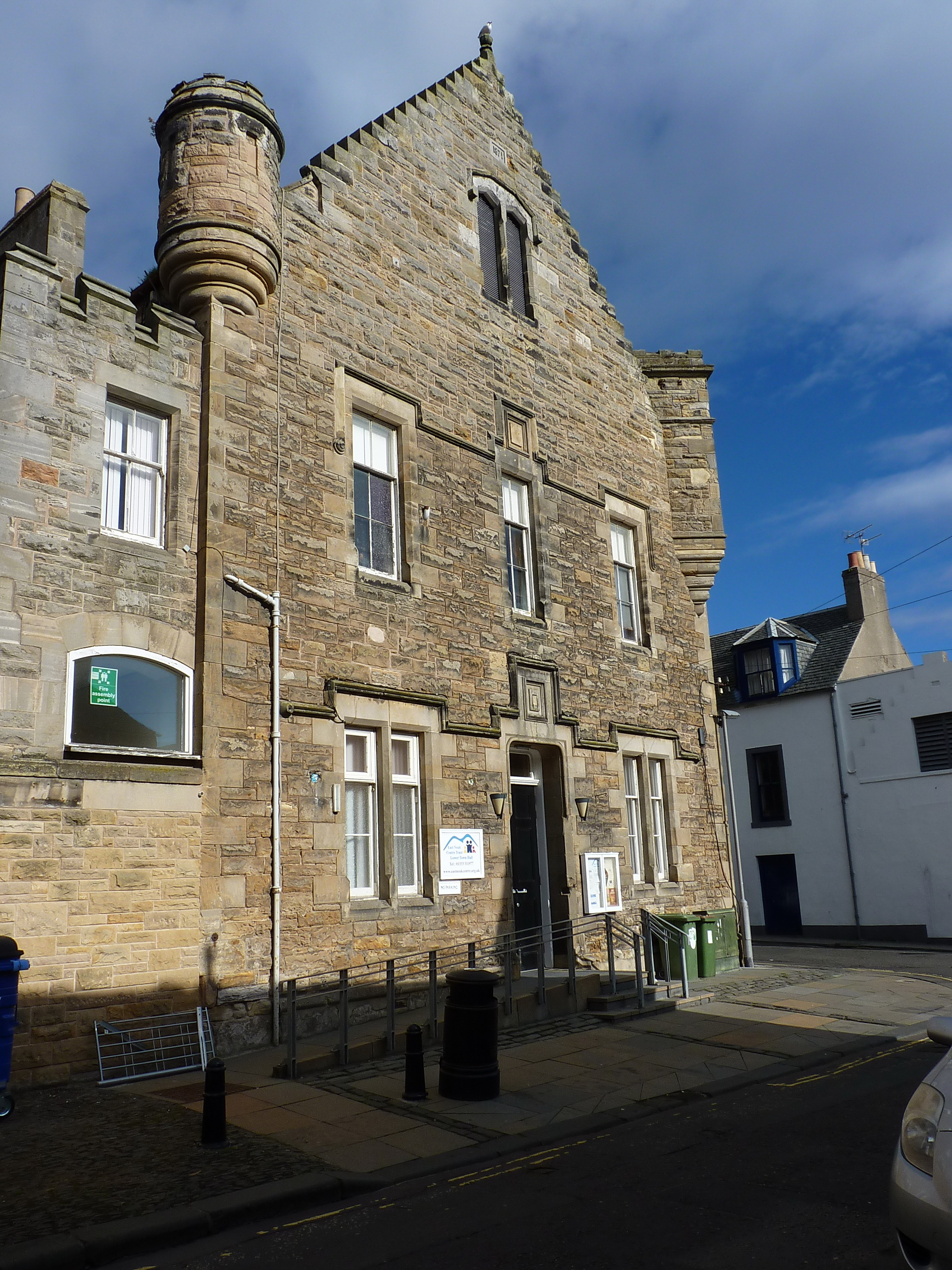
- The Cunzie Street frontage

- Shown in Fife
- 56.2236°N 2.7006°W
- Location: School Green, Anstruther Easter

History
- Built: 1872

Site notes
- Architect: John Harris
- Architectural style: Scottish baronial style

Listed Building – Category B
- Official name: Anstruther Town Hall
- Designated: 9 May 1972
- Reference no.: LB36109

Anstruther Town Hall is a municipal building in School Green, Anstruther Easter, Fife, Scotland. The structure, which is used as a community events venue, is a Category B listed building.

== History ==
In the 1860s, the parish leaders in Anstruther Easter decided to commission a town hall for the parish. The site they selected was on the south side of School Green opposite the parish church. The foundation stone for the new building was laid on 11 August 1871. It was designed by John Harris of St Andrews in the Scottish baronial style, built in snecked masonry at a cost of £2,400 and was officially opened on 16 September 1872.

The design involved a symmetrical main frontage with three bays facing onto School Green. There was short flight of steps leading up to a first-floor doorway, with a rectangular fanlight, which was flanked by Doric order pilasters supporting an entablature and a panel containing a carving of an anchor. There was a stepped gable above containing bi-partite mullioned windows at attic level. The outer bays also contained bi-partite mullioned windows. The Kirk Wynd frontage was fenestrated with bi-partite mullioned windows on the ground floor and tri-partite mullioned windows on the first floor, and there were bartizans at the corners. The building stretched back to Cunzie Street, but as that frontage was situated in a less elevated position, it consisted of three floors; the style was similar to the School Green frontage and again featured a doorway with a rectangular fanlight. There was a sash window on the first floor and a stepped gable above containing bi-partite mullioned windows at attic level. The outer bays contained bi-partite mullion windows on the ground floor and sash windows on the first floor. Internally, the principal rooms were the main assembly hall and the burgh chambers.

Following significant population growth, largely associated with the fishing industry, the Kilrenny, Anstruther Easter and Anstruther Wester area became a small burgh with the town hall as its meeting place in 1930. The town hall continued to serve as the meeting place of the burgh council for much of the 20th century but ceased to be the local seat of government when the enlarged North-East Fife District Council was formed in 1975. The burgh chambers then became the meeting place of Anstruther Community Council. In 2006, the building was acquired by a local charity, the East Neuk Centre Trust. The trust commissioned an extensive programme of refurbishment works which were completed in September 2006. The main assembly hall then became a community events venue and also saw use as a location for weddings and civil partnership ceremonies.

Works of art in the town hall include two paintings by the locally-born artist, Robert Fowler, one of Windsor Castle, and one depicting Thomas Black, a local surgeon who drowned in the mud in Anstruther harbour. Other items preserved in the town hall include an ancient yett i.e. gate.

== See also ==
- List of listed buildings in Kilrenny, Fife
