= Jessie Kerr Lawson =

Scottish-Canadian poet and writer

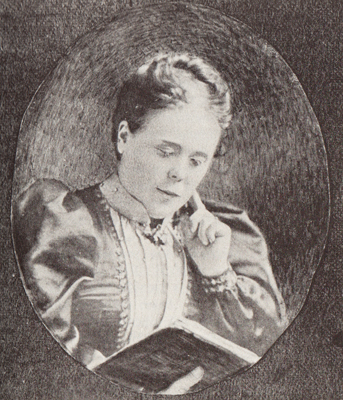
- Jessie Kerr Lawson, c. 1878
- Born: Janet Kerr Coupar; May 19, 1838; Fife
- Died: July 30, 1917 (aged 79); Toronto, Canada
- Occupation: Writer
- Children: 10, including Andrew Lawson
- Writing career
- Language: English

Jessie Kerr Lawson (born Janet Kerr Coupar; May 19, 1838 – July 30, 1917 was a Scottish-Canadian writer and poet.

== Early life ==
Lawson was born in St Monans, Fife in 1838. She worked as a schoolteacher, and married William Lawson before moving to Canada in 1866.

== Writing ==
She started writing verse when she was thirteen. The 1890 book One Hundred Modern Scottish Poets: With Biographical and Critical Notices referred to her work as "revealing much fertility of thought and vigour of expression. ... touched with the realism of the true artist." She used several pen-names. She engaged in journalism in Toronto and Dundee, Scotland, and lived her last years in Toronto.

Her work include the poems A Fisher Idyll, Are Oor Folk In, A Queer Auld Toon and The Birth Of Burns. Other work include Dr Bruno's Wife (1893), The Harvest of Moloch (1908) and Lays and Lyrics (1913).
