= Cellardyke =

Coordinates: 56.2231°N 2.6898°W

Cellardyke: Scottish Gaelic: Cill Raonaidh; Scots: Sillerdyke/Nether Kilrenny
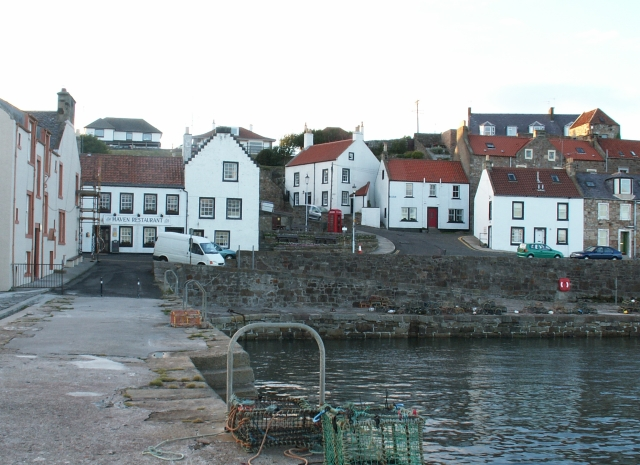
- Traditional white houses around the harbour in Cellardyke

- Location within Fife
- OS grid reference: NO573037
  - Edinburgh: 56 mi (90 km)
  - London: 482 mi (776 km)
- Council area: Fife
- Lieutenancy area: Fife
- Country: Scotland
- Sovereign state: United Kingdom
- Post town: ANSTRUTHER
- Postcode district: KY10
- Dialling code: 01333
- Police: Scotland
- Fire: Scottish
- Ambulance: Scottish
- UK Parliament: North East Fife
- Scottish Parliament: North East Fife

Cellardyke is a village in the East Neuk of Fife, Scotland. The village is to the immediate east of Anstruther (the two effectively being conjoined) and is to the south of Kilrenny.

== History ==
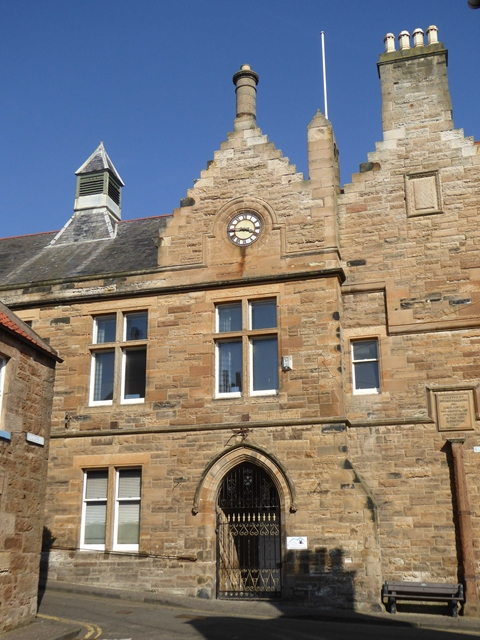
Cellardyke Town Hall

Cellardyke was formerly known as Nether Kilrenny (Scots for Lower Kilrenny) or Sillerdyke, and the harbour as Skinfast Haven, a name which can still be found on maps today. The harbour was built in the 16th century and was rebuilt in 1829–31.

The modern name of the town is thought to have evolved from Sillerdykes (Eng: silverwalls), a reference to the sun glinting off fish scales encrusted on fishing nets left to dry in the sun on the dykes around the harbour.

Cellardyke and Kilrenny came together as the royal burgh of Kilrenny from 1592, having been a burgh of regality since 1578.

Cellardyke remains officially part of Kilrenny parish, and also part of the Anstruther fishing district, its fortunes fluctuating with the fishing trade. The population grew quickly in the 19th century and by the 1860s Cellardyke was a thriving town, with more than fifty boat owners and skippers year round, and one hundred other captains joining in for the annual herring fishing drive or Lammas drave which took place around the Lammas festival on 1 August. There was also a February surge in fishing, when shoals of herring arrived in the Firth of Forth. The fish curers of Cellardyke salted and smoked cod and herring from Anstruther as well as their own fish, sending some to London, and some as far as the West Indies.

Fishing was a hazardous occupation, and over the years a number of boats from Cellardyke were lost. On 30 December 1814, a boat carrying a crew of three was lost en route to Burntisland; all three of the passengers died. On 6 April 1826 a boat was lost. Seven of the crew perished and one survived. On 28 May 1844 a boat with eight crew members was lost. Two years later, on 23 April 1846 a boat with seven crew was lost. On 3 November 1848 a boat with eight crew was lost. The next loss occurred on 10 May 1865, when a boat with eight crew disappeared. In 1910 a boat from Pittenweem sank off Cellardyke with the loss of three lives. There was one survivor.

In addition, on 1 July 1837 a boat from Cellardyke carrying people on an excursion to the Isle of May as part of a celebration for the start of the herring fishing foundered. Seventeen women and children lost their lives.

Cellardyke Town Hall was designed by Henry & Hall and completed in 1883.

== Harbour area ==
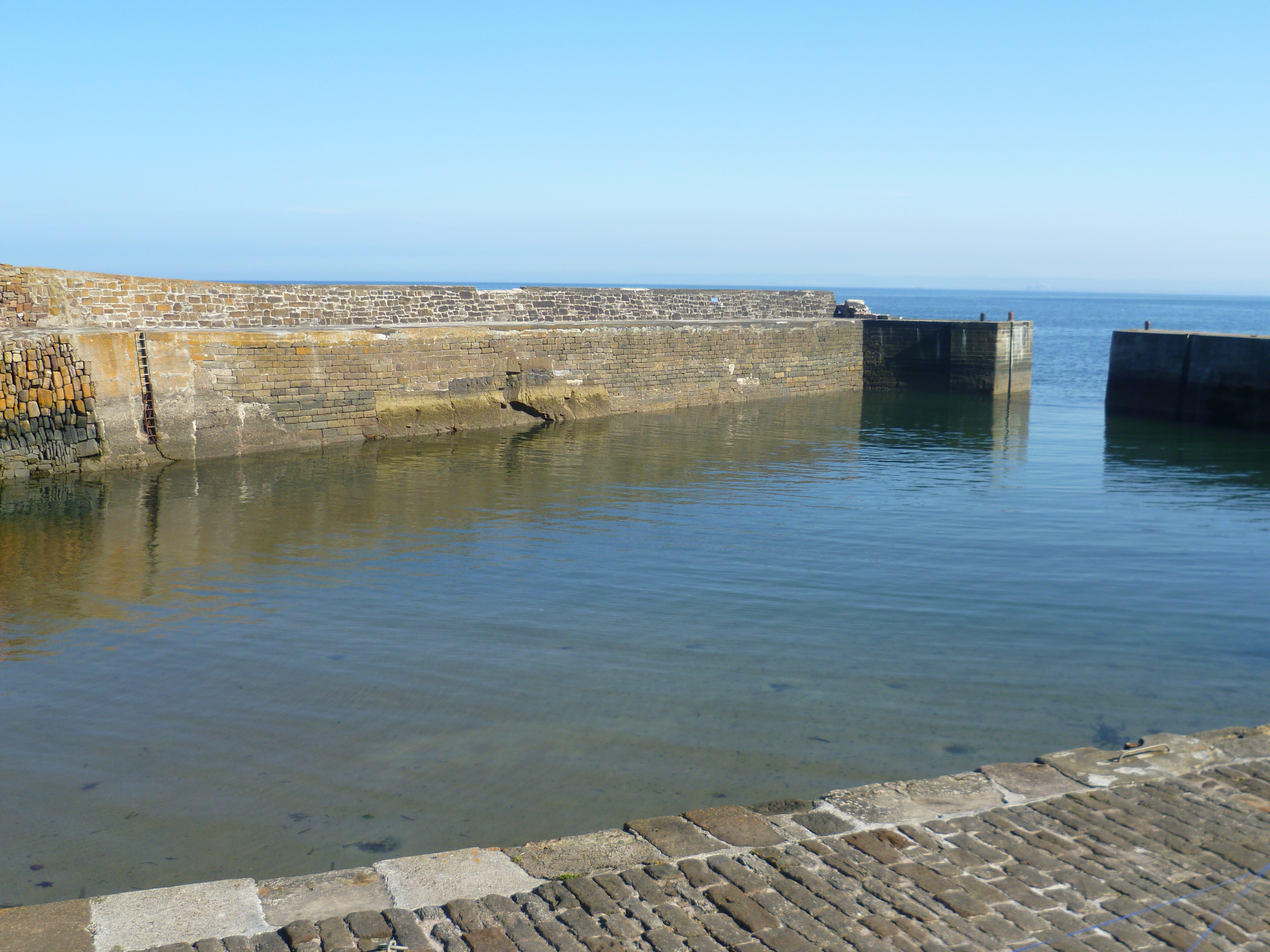
The harbour entrance

Like many harbours in Scotland, the fishing fleet that once occupied the harbour has been largely replaced by pleasure craft. Around 200 fishing boats were once based here but much of the fleet was destroyed by a storm in 1898, with most of those left intact relocating a short way down the coast to Anstruther. Cellardyke harbour is now home to a few small creel and pleasure boats.

== Avian flu ==
Cellardyke was the first place in the UK that an instance of avian influenza, caused by the H5N1 subtype of the Influenza A virus, was confirmed. A dead swan was found floating in Cellardyke harbour on 29 March 2006, and was subsequently collected by the Department for Environment, Food and Rural Affairs. The Veterinary Laboratories Agency (VLA) began testing blood samples from the wild swan on 3 April 2006. The Scottish Executive announced a positive test of the blood samples on 5 April 2006, and the strain was identified as the highly pathogenic H5N1 variant on 6 April 2006. The incident brought unprecedented attention to Cellardyke, with worldwide media coverage of the events being broadcast from the small harbour.

The bird was a whooper swan of whom around 7,500 are thought to come to the UK during the winter. These are known to migrate from Iceland, Scandinavia and northern Russia. Some experts have suggested that the swan could have died in another country and been washed up on the coast.
