= Kilrenny, Anstruther Easter and Anstruther Wester =

Coordinates: 56.234°N 2.687°W

Kilrenny, Anstruther Easter and Anstruther Wester was a royal and small burgh in Fife, Scotland from 1930 to 1975.

The burgh was formed by the amalgamation of three neighbouring royal burghs of Kilrenny, Anstruther Easter and Anstruther Wester by the Local Government (Scotland) Act 1929. The three merging towns had all received royal burgh status between 1578 and 1583.

In 1975 the small burgh was abolished by the Local Government (Scotland) Act 1973, and the area of the burgh was included in the North East Fife District of Fife Region. In 1996 the district was abolished and the towns are now located in the unitary council area of Fife.

Kilrenny Anstruther and District community council has been formed to represent the towns and surrounding area.
