= North East Fife (district) =

Former local government area of Scotland

Coordinates: 56.319°N 3.012°W

- District
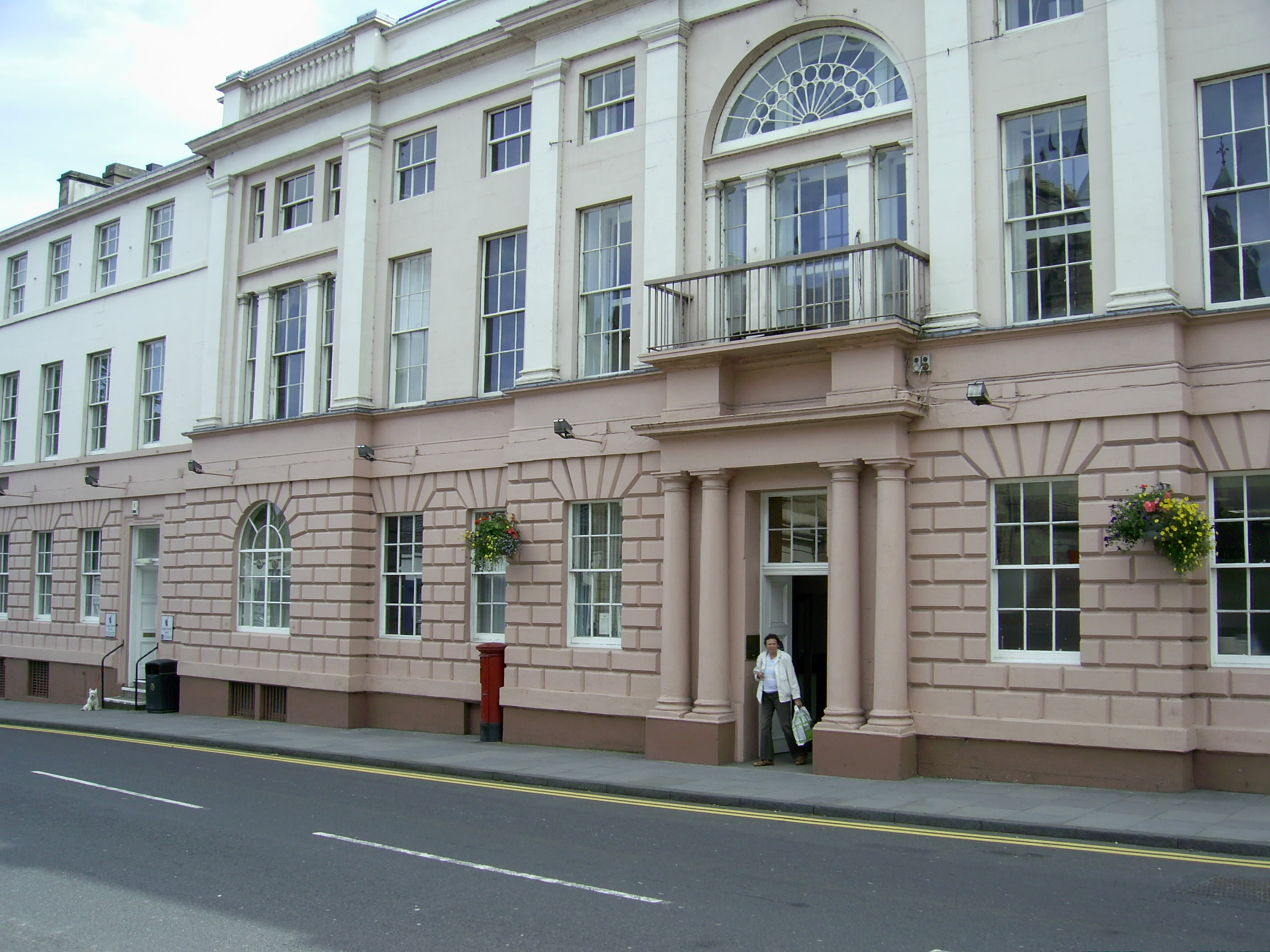
- County Buildings, Cupar

- North-East Fife district within Scotland
- Population
  - 1994: 69,930
- History
  - Created: 16 May 1975
  - Abolished: 31 March 1996
  - Succeeded by: Fife
- Government: North East Fife District Council
  - HQ: Cupar

North East Fife was one of three local government districts in the Fife region of Scotland from 1975 to 1996.

== History ==
The district was created in 1975 under the Local Government (Scotland) Act 1973, which established a two-tier structure of local government across mainland Scotland comprising upper-tier regions and lower-tier districts. North East Fife was one of three districts created within the region of Fife, along with Dunfermline and Kirkcaldy. The district covered the whole area of 15 former districts from the historic county of Fife, which were all abolished at the same time:

- Auchtermuchty Burgh
- Crail Burgh
- Cupar Burgh
- Cupar District
- Elie and Earlsferry Burgh
- Falkland Burgh
- Kilrenny, Anstruther Easter and Anstruther Wester Burgh
- Ladybank Burgh
- Newburgh Burgh
- Newport-on-Tay Burgh
- Pittenweem Burgh
- St Andrews Burgh
- St Andrews District
- St Monance Burgh
- Tayport Burgh

In 1996 Scotland's districts and regions were abolished under the Local Government etc. (Scotland) Act 1994. Fife became a single unitary council area, headquartered in Glenrothes as the regional council had also been.

The area is still covered by the North East Fife (UK Parliament constituency).

== Political control ==
The first election to the district council was held in 1974, initially operating as a shadow authority alongside the outgoing authorities until it came into its powers on 16 May 1975. Political control of the council from 1975 was as follows:

Party in control	Years
Conservative	1975–1984
Alliance	1984–1988
Liberal Democrats	1988–1996

=== Elections ===
Year	Seats	Liberal Democrats (Note: Includes Liberal and Social Democratic Party prior to 1988, with the two parties having formed the SDP–Liberal Alliance between 1981 and 1988.)	Conservative	Independent / Other	Notes
1974	18	0	13	5	
1977	18	1	14	3	
1980	18	5	11	2	
1984	18	10	6	2	
1988	18	12	4	2	
1992	18	13	4	1	

=== District result maps ===
1980 results map

1984 results map

1988 results map

1992 results map

== Premises ==
The council was based at County Buildings on St Catherine Street in Cupar. The building had been built in 1817 as the county's sheriff court and meeting place for the Commissioners of Supply which preceded the county council. It had then served as the headquarters of Fife County Council between 1890 and 1975, with a large extension to the east being added in 1925.

== See also ==
- Subdivisions of Scotland
