= Crail Lifeboat Station =

Former RNLI lifeboat station in Fife, Scotland

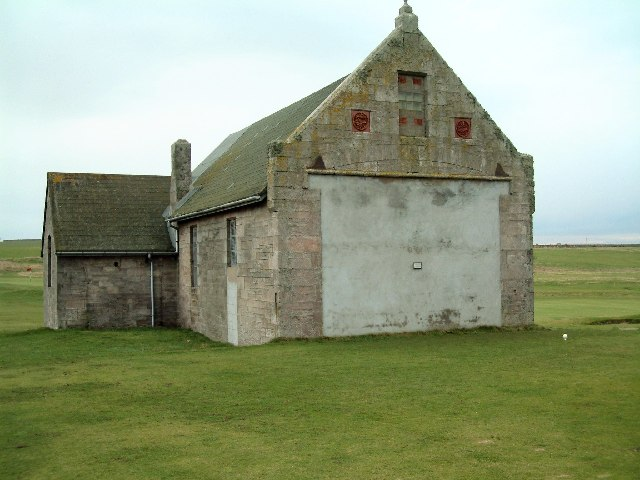
- Old lifeboat station at Crail

- Balcomie Links, Nr. Crail, Fife

General information
- Status: Closed
- Location: The Old Lifeboathouse, Balcomie Links, Crail, Fife, KY10 3XN, Scotland
- Coordinates: 56°16′57.0″N 2°35′51.6″W
- Opened: 6 November 1884
- Closed: 1923

Crail Lifeboat Station was located 2 miles (3.2 km) north-east of Crail, at Balcomie Links on Fife Ness, a headland at the most easterly point of the Fife peninsula.

A lifeboat station was established at Crail in 1884, by the Royal National Lifeboat Institution (RNLI).

In operation for 39 years, Crail Lifeboat Station was closed in 1923.

== History ==
At a meeting of the RNLI committee of management on Thursday 7 February 1884, with the promise of local support, it was decided to establish a new lifeboat station at Crail, located midway between the existing stations at St Andrews and Anstruther. A boathouse was constructed on Balcomie Links, on land granted to the RNLI by Col. James Robert Blackwell MonyPenny, 26th Laird of Pitmilly, at a cost of £520.

On 6 November 1884, a 34-foot self-righting 'Pulling and Sailing' (P&S) Lifeboat, one with both oars and sails, arrived at Crail railway station, transported by the Anstruther and St Andrews Railway. Led by the Anstruther Volunteer Band, the lifeboat, which cost £356, was drawn on its carriage by 5 pairs of horses, the two miles to the boathouse at Balcomie Links, followed by Town Councillors, Lifeboat committee and crew, and some 2000 people. At a ceremony at the boathouse, the boat, bearing the legend "Ready, aye ready", was named George Paterson (ON 91), having been funded from the legacy of the late Miss Paterson of Edinburgh.

The George Paterson was replaced in 1910. In 26 years on service, she had been launched only three times, and recorded no lives saved.

In 1904, a sum of £1798-16-8d was received by the Institution, the bequest of the late Mr Edwin Kay of Southsea, for the provision of a lifeboat to bear his name. A 35-foot self-righting (P&S) lifeboat was placed on service at Crail on 4 January 1910, and was duly named Edwin Kay (ON 601).

On 27 December 1914, the Crail lifeboat Edwin Kay (ON 601) was launched at 06:00 to the aid of the Royal Navy vessel HMS Success, a B-class torpedo boat destroyer, which had run aground at Kingsbarns with 67 crew aboard. Despite skilful seamanship in testing conditions, the lifeboat was holed, and Coxswain Cunningham and another crew member were washed overboard. The two men were recovered, and the lifeboat went on to rescue 20 men from the Success. Two more trips rescued a further 34. The St Andrews lifeboat John and Sarah Hatfield (ON 600) rescued the last 13. Coxswain Andrew Cunningham was awarded the RNLI Silver Medal, and the crew were awarded £7 from the officer's mess of the Cape Light Horse Regiment in South Africa.

Crail Lifeboat Station was closed on 31 March 1923. The lifeboat on station, Edwin Kay (ON 601) was transferred to the relief fleet, later being used for demonstrations. In 13 years at Crail, the lifeboat was launched 12 times, and saved 84 lives. She was sold out of service in 1938. The boathouse is located on the Crail Golf Course at Balcomie Links, and is used as a greenkeepers store.

== Station honours ==
The following are awards made at Crail.

- RNLI Silver Medal

Andrew Cunningham, Coxswain – 1915

== Crail lifeboats ==
=== Pulling and Sailing (P&S) lifeboats ===
ON (Note: ON is the RNLI's Official Number of the boat.)	Name	Built	On station	Class	Comments
91	George Paterson	1884	1884–1910	34-foot Self-righting (P&S)	(Note: 34-foot x 8-foot (10-oared) self-righting (P&S) lifeboat, legacy of Miss C. Paterson of Edinburgh, built by Forrestt of Limehouse, costing £356.)
601	Edwin Kay	1909	1910–1923	35-foot Rubie Self-righting (P&S)	(Note: 35-foot x 8-foot 10in (10-oared) Rubie self-righting (P&S) lifeboat, legacy of Mr E. Kay of Southsea, built by Thames Ironworks of Blackwall, London, costing £901.)

Station Closed, 1923

Pre ON numbers are unofficial numbers used by the Lifeboat Enthusiast Society to reference early lifeboats not included on the official RNLI list.

== See also ==
- List of RNLI stations
- List of former RNLI stations
- Royal National Lifeboat Institution lifeboats
