= North Carr Lightship =

Scottish ship serving as a lighthouse

Coordinates: 56.461°N 2.959°W

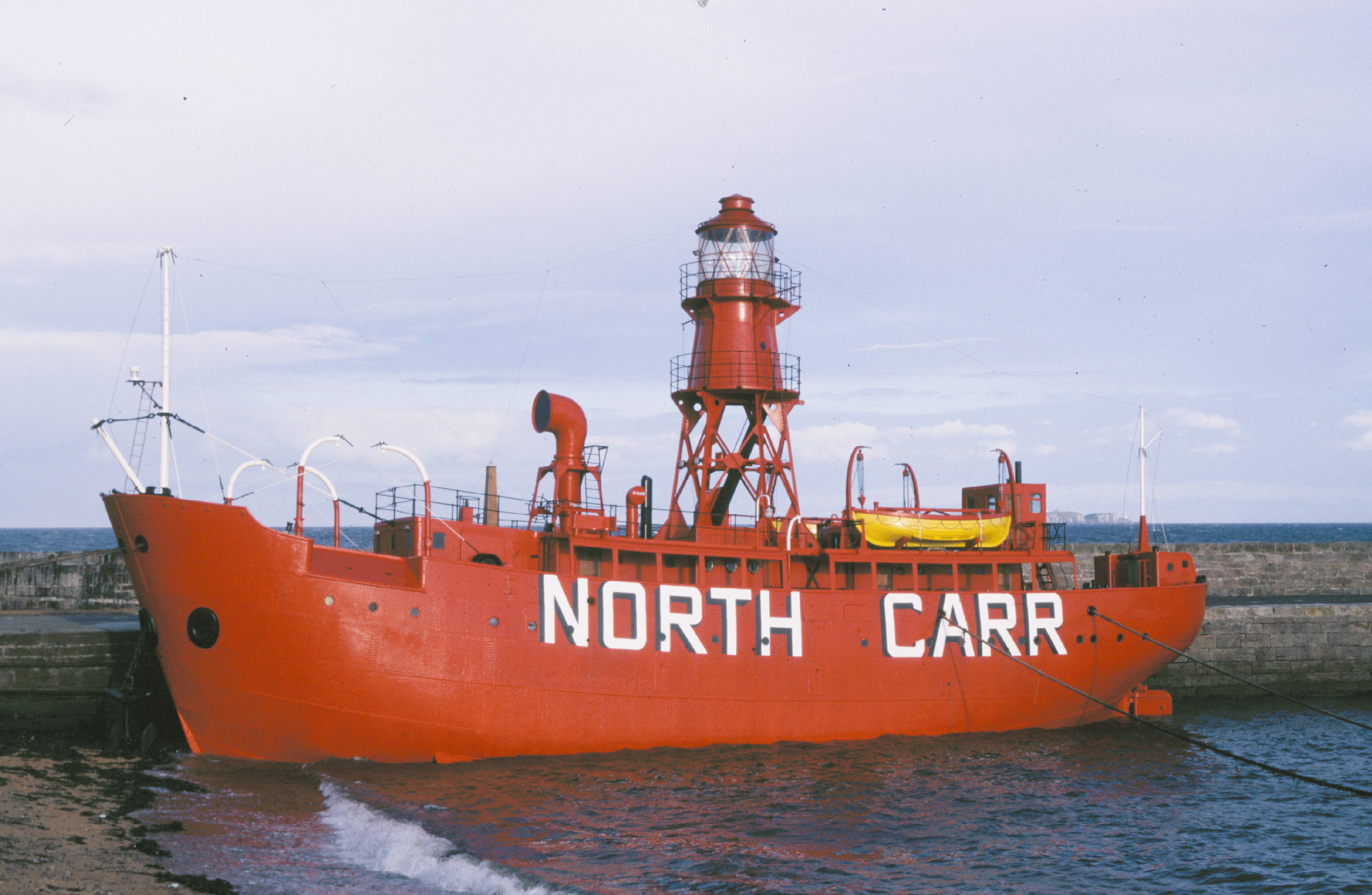

History

Scotland
- Name: North Carr
- Owner: Northern Lighthouse Board (1933–1975); North East Fife District Council/Fife Council (1976–2010); Tay Maritime Action (Taymara) (Since 2010)
- Port of registry: Dundee, Scotland, United Kingdom
- Builder: A. & J. Inglis, Ltd.
- Yard number: 921
- Laid down: 1932
- Launched: 27 February 1933
- Decommissioned: 1975
- Status: Awaiting deconstruction

General characteristics
- Type: Lightship
- Tonnage: 268 GT
- Length: 101 ft (31 m)
- Beam: 25 ft (7.6 m)

North Carr is the last remaining Scottish lightship. She is 101 feet (31 m) in length, 25 feet (7.6 m) in beam and 268 tons.

The purpose of the vessel was to warn mariners by sight, light or sound of the dangers of the North Carr rocks which are situated 1.7 miles (2.7 km) off Fife Ness at the turning point for vessels sailing between the Forth and the Tay. The North Carr is currently berthed in the Victoria Dock, Dundee, awaiting deconstruction in 2024.

== History ==
She was built by A. & J. Inglis Ltd, (part of Harland & Wolff) for the Northern Lighthouse Board for £15,000 at Pointhouse Shipyard, Glasgow in 1932 and completed on 27 February 1933. In service she was anchored off Fife Ness until 1975. From then she served as a tourist attraction in Anstruther harbour. She is the third and last vessel to carry the name – the first was borrowed from Trinity House London, the English counterpart of Northern Lighthouse Board. The second was purpose built in Dundee, reported to have sat so low in the water that her decks were always awash and the only way up to the light was up a rope ladder in the rigging – no mean feat at the best of times.

She created a commotion in Edinburgh on account of her fog horn being tested while lying at 3/4 mile (1.2 km) outside Granton in the Firth of Forth. As the fog horn had a range of approximately 10 miles (16 km), north Edinburgh could hear it clearly and there were numerous complaints.

On 8 December 1959, the lightship was the subject of a tragic rescue mission. After the lightship broke her moorings and began to drift in heavy seas, the Broughty Ferry lifeboat (The Mona) was launched. Her crew of eight was lost when the lifeboat capsized. The lightship and its crew survived and after repair was towed back to its station.

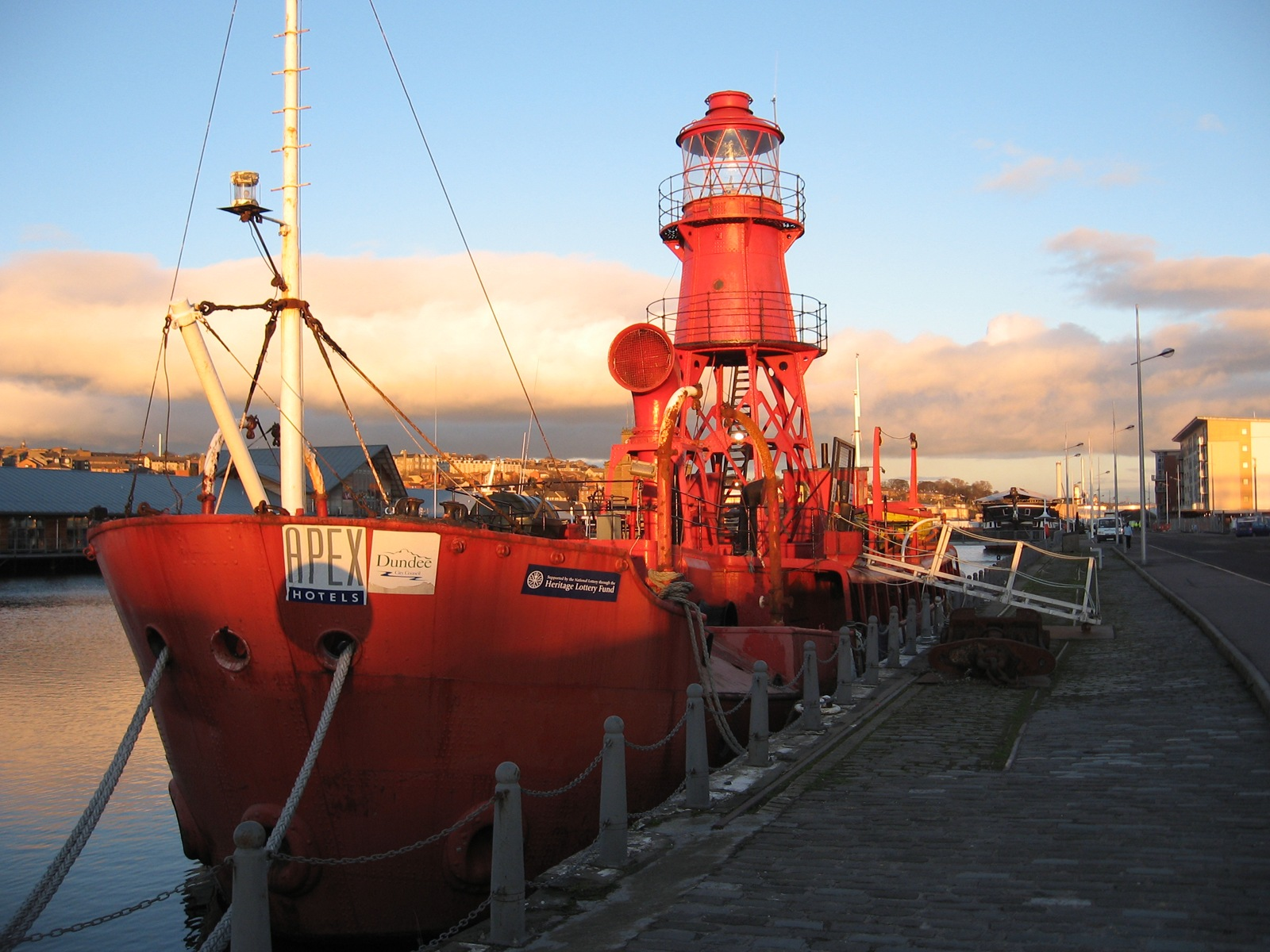
The North Carr Lightship moored in Dundee in early 2007.

== After decommissioning ==
The lightship was used as a museum in Anstruther for years after she left service. She was purchased from a scrapyard in 2010 for £1 and funds were sought by the charity Tay Maritime Action (Taymara) to restore her as an exhibition space on the Dundee waterfront. However, due to a lack of funding, the lightship is yet to receive the new lick of paint or restoration she needs. She is currently docked in the West Victoria Dock near to HMS Unicorn.

== Deconstruction ==
On 29 November 2023, Taymara announced their intention to deconstruct the ship in January 2024 following continued deterioration. Preparatory work for restoration had originally began with the removal of two lifeboats two years prior.

After the announcement, several ideas were brought forward to retain parts of the ship, including the beacon to be put on display. As of December 2023, no plans have been announced to retain parts of the North Carr.

July 4, 2026 - The lightship still survives in its current location, no sign of deconstruction but it continues to degrade. No access available and it is protected by fencing.
