= St Andrews Lifeboat Station =

Former RNLI lifeboat station in Fife, Scotland

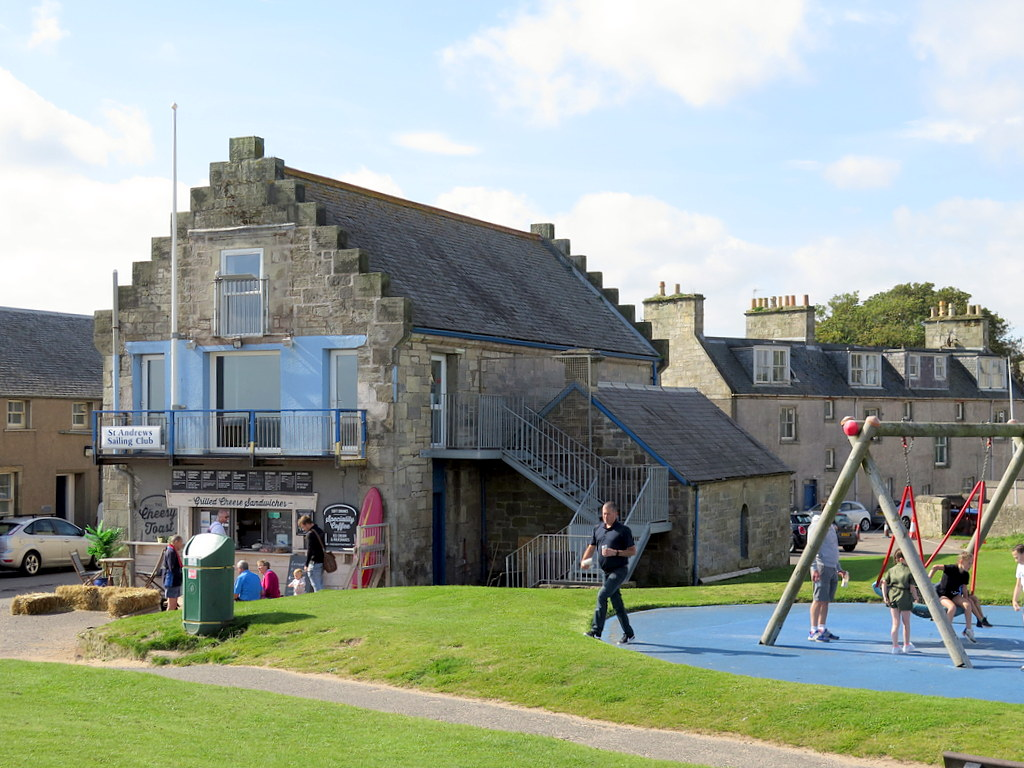
- 1910 Lifeboat House at St Andrews

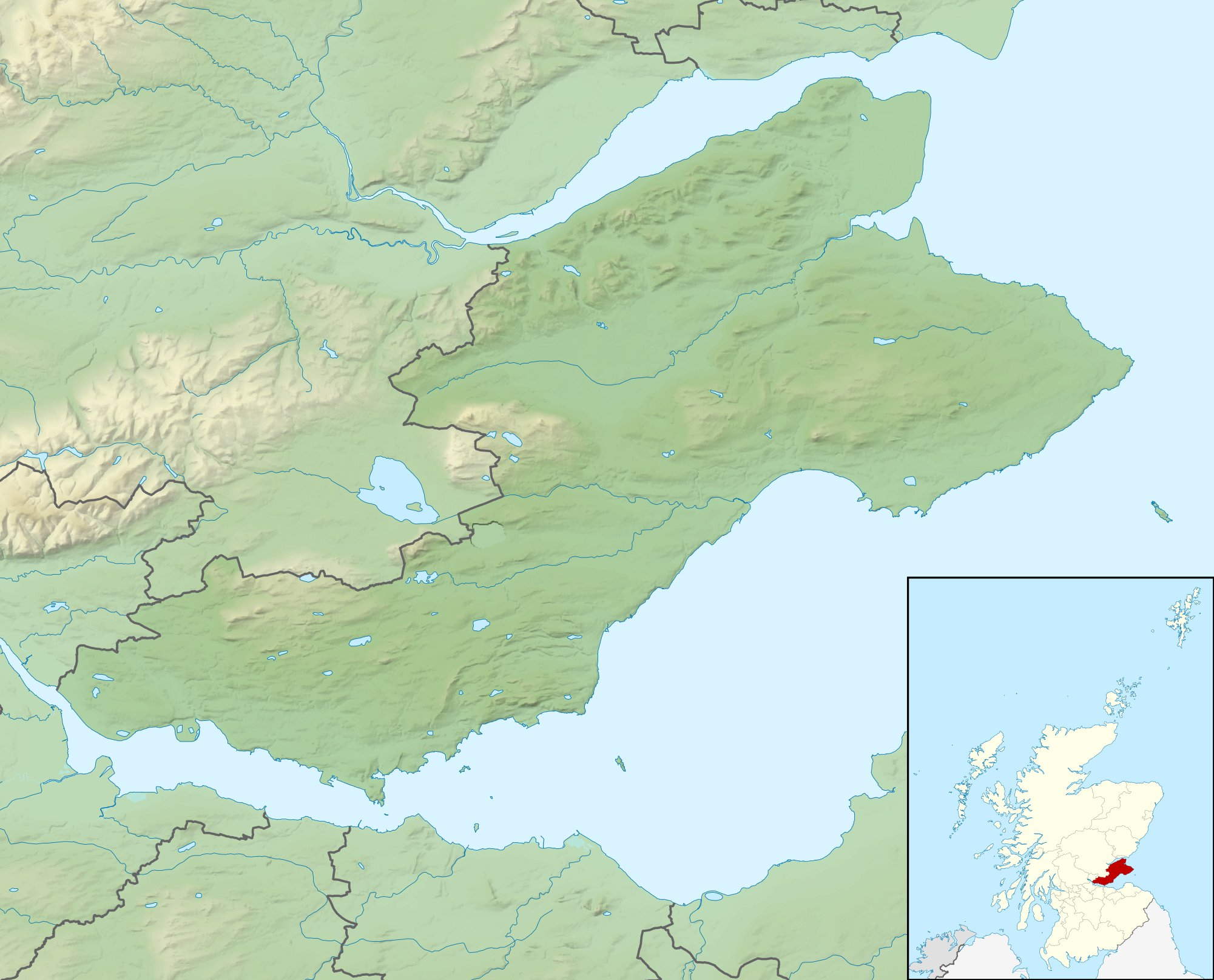
- Location within Fife

General information
- Status: Closed
- Location: The Old Boathouse, Woodburn Pl,, St Andrews, Fife, KY16 8LA, Scotland
- Coordinates: 56°20′10.5″N 2°46′56.5″W
- Opened: 1802
- Closed: 1938

St Andrews Lifeboat Station was located at Woodburn Place, in the town of St Andrews, approximately 13 miles (21 km) south-east of Dundee, on the east coast of the Fife peninsula.

A lifeboat was first placed at St Andrews in 1802. Management of the station was transferred to the Royal National Lifeboat Institution (RNLI) in 1860. An Independent lifeboat station was established at Boarhills in 1865, operating until 1891.

St Andrews Lifeboat Station was closed in 1938.

== History ==
On 3 January 1800, the sloop Janet was driven ashore and wrecked at St Andrews. John Honey, a six-foot four-inch tall University student, and acknowledged athlete and swimmer, was alerted by his tutor that his skills were needed on the shore. Swimming out to the wreck, he brought a line ashore, and the Master and four crew were pulled to safety.

Amongst the crowd watching on, was Dean of Guild, magistrate and merchant Cathcart Dempster. Inspired by the actions of John Honey, he started a public fund for the provision of a lifeboat at St Andrews. With additional funds provided by Lloyd's of London, who had a vested interest in reducing insurance claims, a 30-foot lifeboat was ordered from Henry Greathead of South Shields. The boat arrived in the first week of January 1802, and her trials were reported in the Edinburgh Courant of 12 January. The boat was non-self-righting, but to provide greater buoyancy, it was lined with cork. This brought about the local naming Cork Lifeboat. The boat was placed in a boathouse at East Bents.

Only one effective service is recorded for the Cork Lifeboat. On 9 January 1803, the vessel Meanwell of Scarborough, North Yorkshire was driven ashore and wrecked at St Andrews, whilst on passage from Bordeaux. Local fishermen were reluctant to man the lifeboat in the conditions, until Cathcart Dempster, Capt. David Stewart and Major Horburgh volunteered their services. All 12 of the crew of the Meanwell were rescued.

The Cork Lifeboat was not required for the next 21 years, in which time, much neglected, she had fallen into disrepair. A hole in the roof of the boathouse had caused one wall to collapse. In the storms encountered at the start of February 1823, it would be a local fishing yawl, Craignoons, that was used to carry out rescues. Six people were rescued from the brig Itinerant. The boat then rescued three of the six crew of the John and Sarah of Woodbridge, Suffolk, the remaining three choosing to try to save their possessions, at the cost of their lives, as the Craignoons was unable to get close again.

A replacement lifeboat was immediately ordered. Designed locally for use as a surf boat, a 27-foot self-righting lifeboat was constructed with 16 airtight compartments, and 5 copper relieving tubes to rid the boat of water. She was delivered from the boatyard in Tynemouth in September 1824. Lowered into the harbour keel upright on her arrival, she self-righted perfectly. The boat was known locally as Volunteer Lifeboat.

This lifeboat was kept in a boathouse next to Swilken Bridge, which in those days wasn't the bridge on St Andrews Golf Course, which was then known as the Golfer's bridge, but the main road-bridge, formerly known as Windmill Path, later to be Old Station Road.

Between 1835 and 1841, six medals for gallantry were awarded by the Royal National Institution for the Preservation of Life from Shipwreck (RNIPLS), later to become the RNLI in 1854, for three rescues by Coastguard and a Pilot at St Andrews.

- 4 October 1835, Schooner Tidd, crew rescued (gold and silver)
- 30 December 1839, Vessel Isabella and Ann, rescued the Master and 12 crew (silver)
- 20 October 1841, Sloop Thomas and George, rescued the Master and three crew. (silver x 3)

== 1860 onwards ==
In June 1859, the RNLI put out the message that it was "desirous to extend its work of usefulness to the Coasts of Scotland...by the superintendence of an Honorary Committee of residents in each locality, who on their part undertake to collect locally what amount they are able of Donations towards the first Cost, and of Annual Contributions towards the permanent expenses of their several Establishments."

With their existing lifeboat now 36-years-old, St Andrews Lifeboat Society were pleased to hand over the management of the station to the RNLI, who could provide a replacement lifeboat, and a local branch of the Institution was established. A new 32-foot self-righting 'Pulling and Sailing' (P&S) lifeboat, one with sails and (10) oars, and costing £181, was placed at St Andrews in 1860. The cost of the life-boat was funded by the donation of £560, presented to the Institution by A. W. Jaffray, Esq., of London, and at his request, was named Annie. Still under his sponsorship, the lifeboat would later be renamed Polly and Lucy.

A new boathouse was constructed at Woodburn Place, costing a further £193-18s, which along with the new lifeboat carriage, was funded by local residents through the efforts of the local branch. The lifeboat and carriage were transported to St Andrews free of charge by the Dundee Perth and London Shipping Company.

Two services in 1912 would earn Coxswain James Chisholm the RNLI Silver Medal. On 29 September, three men were rescued from the fishing boat Resolute, moments before the vessel was wrecked on the rocks at St Andrews Bar. On 1 October, in rough conditions and with skillfully navigation around the rocks at West Sands, nine men were rescued from the Swedish barque Princess Wilhelmina.

Local man Robert Brown was awarded the RNLI Silver Medal in 1915, when he put out in a small boat at Kingbarns, and saved the lives of two airmen, when their seaplane had been forced down in a gale.

The St Andrews lifeboat John and Sarah Hatfield (ON 600) was launched to the aid of the steam trawler Loch Long, after she ran shore at Balcomie Briggs on 9 March 1931, and reached the vessel at daybreak. Veering down, a Breeches buoy system was set up, and one man was recovered. The lifeboat then managed to get closer to the Loch Long, and the remaining nine crew jumped aboard the lifeboat. For this service, Coxswain David Fenton was awarded the RNLI Bronze Medal.

By 1938, with modern motor-lifeboats at the flanking stations of Broughty Ferry, Arbroath and Anstruther, the 26-year-old pulling and sailing lifeboat John and Sarah Hatfield (ON 600) was effectively obsolete. The boat had not been called on service since 1932. Coxswain David Fenton was also set to retire in September 1938, and there was nobody lined up as his replacement. St Andrews Lifeboat station closed at the end of August 1938.

The station building at Woodburn Place, a second structure constructed in 1910, still stands, and is currently used by St Andrew Sailing Club. The John and Sarah Hatfield (ON 600) was sold, and was last reported as a yacht in Cyprus in 1987.

== Boarhills Lifeboat Station ==
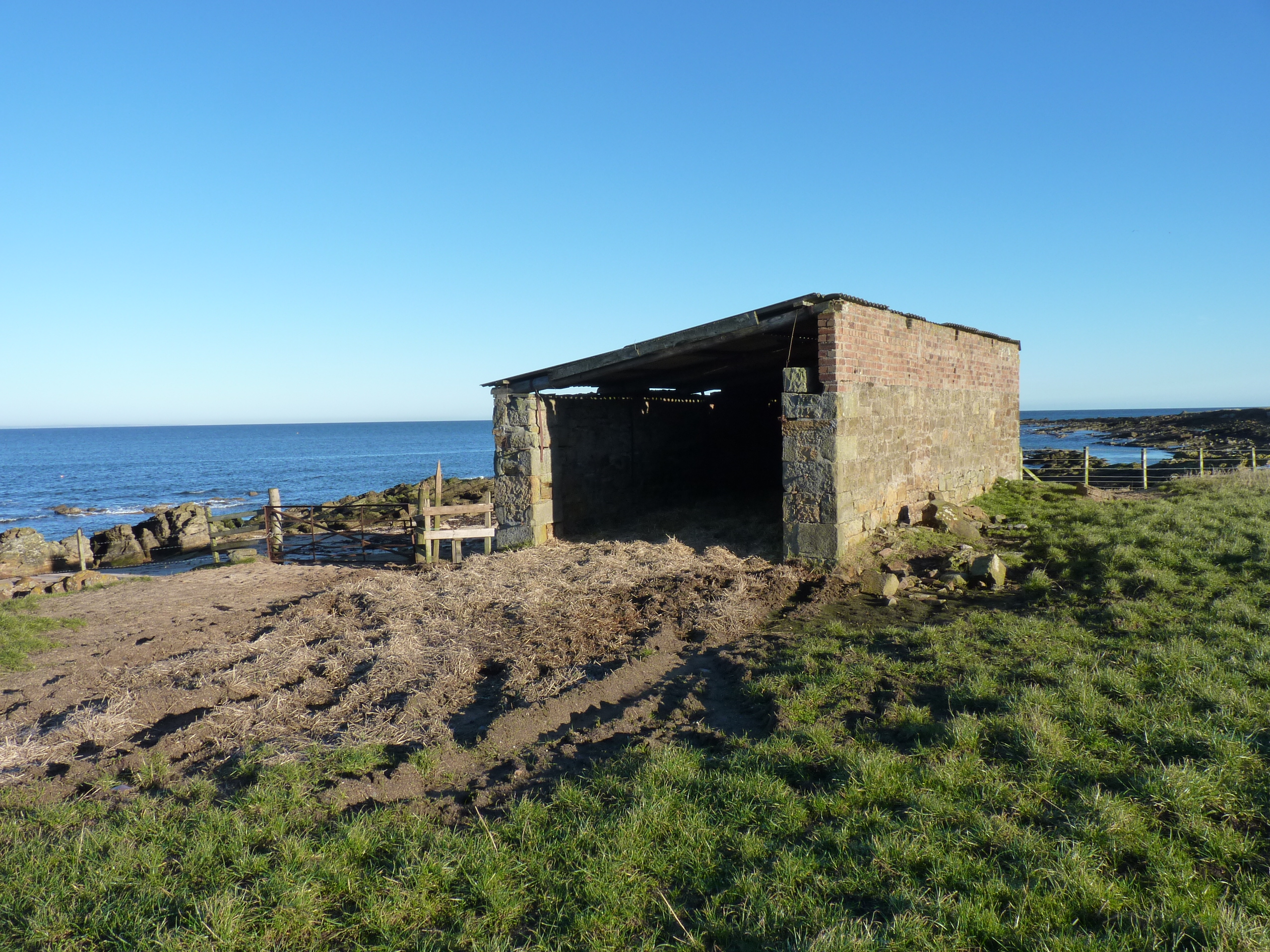
Former Boarhills Lifeboat House

On 23 October 1864, the brig Napoleon was wrecked off Boarhills in St Andrews Bay, whilst on passage from Sunderland to Gothenburg. Conditions were too bad to try to launch at St Andrews and row the 5 miles to Boarhills, but both the Coxswain Alex Mackrell and Honorary Secretary John Purvis were in agreement that transporting the lifeboat to Boarhills was pointless, as the boat could not be launched there. All eight of the crew of the Napoleon were lost.

Just one month later, in a storm of 22 November, the barque Sidonia was seen flying distress signals. Much to the disagreement of everyone else, including Second Coxswain William Chisholm, Coxswain Alex Mackrell refused to launch, claiming they were not in distress. As the wind changed, the boat was driven away from St Andrews, but would later wreck at Banff, Aberdeenshire. One crew member was lost.

There had been much disagreement about the (non) action taken, when the brig Napoleon had been lost. One of the St Andrew lifeboat Committee, George Bruce, was so convinced that a lifeboat could operate from Boarhills, that he purchased the old Volunteer Lifeboat. The former boathouse at Swilken Bridge was dismantled, and reconstructed 5 miles (8.0 km) to the south of St Andrews, on the shore at Boarhills. William Chisholm was appointed Coxswain, and the boat was renamed Bruce's Own. In December 1865, Boarhills Lifeboat Station was opened, and served independently of the RNLI for the next 26 years. When a new lifeboat arrived at St Andrews in 1873, Polly and Lucy was transferred to the Boarhills station, operating there until 1881. In 1881, the boathouse was extended, and a replacement lifeboat, John and James Mills, finally replaced the 51-year-old Volunteer Lifeboat.

The RNLI opened a new station 6 miles (9.7 km) further south at Crail in 1884, and there was then little call for the Boarhills boat. However, in possibly the last service, under the command of local fisherman James Gourlay, six men were rescued from the schooner Francis, when she was wrecked in St Andrew's bay on 5 April 1891. Despite this being an independent lifeboat, James Grieve Gourlay was awarded the RNLI Silver Medal. Although it is recorded that the station closed in 1891, it may be that the lifeboat was just never called again, and the station gradually ceased to operate. The John and James Mills lifeboat was still in the boathouse in 1917, when it was sold in aid of The Shipwrecked Fishermen and Mariners' Royal Benevolent Society.

The lifeboats at St Andrews and Boarhills had launched over 100 times, and saved 250 lives.

== Station honours ==
The following are awards made at St Andrews and Boarhills.

- RNIPLS Gold Medal

Lt. Henry Cox, RN, H.M. Coastguard – 1835

- RNIPLS Silver Medal

Robert Fulton, RN, Master, H.M. Coastguard – 1835

Lt. Henry Cox, RN, H.M. Coastguard – 1840

John Gregory, Boatman, H.M. Coastguard – 1841
Neil McNaughton, Boatman, H.M. Coastguard – 1841
John Wilson, Pilot – 1841

- RNLI Silver Medal

James Grieve Gourlay, Fisherman – 1891

James Chisholm, Coxswain – 1912

Robert Brown – 1915

- RNLI Bronze Medal

David Fenton, Coxswain – 1931

== Roll of honour ==
In memory of those lost whilst serving St Andrews lifeboat.

- Run over by the lifeboat carriage wheels, during launch to the brigantine Kiana on 18 February 1898.

George Sharp

- Run over by the lifeboat carriage wheels, during launch to the fishing trawler Spes Bona on 9 March 1932, and died some days later in hospital.

Pat Flanagan

== St Andrews lifeboats ==
=== St Andrews Lifeboat Society lifeboats ===
| Name | Built | On station | Class | Comments |
|---|---|---|---|---|
| Cork Lifeboat | 1802 | 1802–1823 | 30-foot Greathead | (Note: 30-foot Greathead lifeboat, built by Henry Greathead of South Shields, costing £130.); Damaged in 1823. |
| Volunteer Lifeboat | 1824 | 1824–1860 | 27-foot North Country | (Note: 27-foot North Country non-self-righting lifeboat, built in Tyneside.); Sold to private society at Boarhills in 1865. |

=== RNLI lifeboats ===
==== Pulling and Sailing (P&S) lifeboats ====
| ON (Note: ON is the RNLI's Official Number of the boat.) | Name | Built | On station | Class | Comments |
|---|---|---|---|---|---|
| Pre-354 | Annie | 1859 | 1860–1871 | 32-foot Peake Self-righting (P&S) | (Note: 32-foot x 7-foot 9in (10-oared) self-righting (P&S) lifeboat, legacy of Mr A. W. Jaffray of London, built by Forrestt of Limehouse, London, costing £181.); Renamed Polly and Lucy in 1871. |
| Pre-354 | Polly and Lucy | 1859 | 1871–1873 | 32-foot Peake Self-righting (P&S) | (Note: Legacy of Mr A. W. Jaffray of London.); Sold to private society at Boarhills in 1873 after refit. |
| 232 | Ladies Own | 1873 | 1873–1893 | 33-foot Peake Self-righting (P&S) | (Note: 33-foot x 8-foot (10-oared) self-righting (P&S) lifeboat, funded by the Newark Lifeboat Fund via Miss E. Smithers, built by Woolfe of Shadwell, London, costing £285.) |
| 349 | Louisa | 1893 | 1893–1910 | 34-foot Self-righting (P&S) | (Note: 34-foot x 8-foot (10-oared) self-righting (P&S) lifeboat, legacy of Mrs L. C. Wigney of Twyford, Berkshire, built by Forrestt of Limehouse, London, costing £420.) |
| 600 | John and Sarah Hatfield | 1910 | 1910–1938 | 35-foot Rubie Self-righting (P&S) | (Note: 35-foot x 8-foot 10in (10-oared) Rubie self-righting (P&S) lifeboat, legacy of Mr J. Hatfield of Colwyn Bay, built by Thames Ironworks of Blackwall, London, costing £947.) |

Station Closed in 1938
Pre ON numbers are unofficial numbers used by the Lifeboat Enthusiast Society to reference early lifeboats not included on the official RNLI list.

== Boarhills lifeboats ==
| ON | Name | Built | On station | Class | Comments |
|---|---|---|---|---|---|
| – | Bruce's Own | 1824 | 1865–1873 | 27-foot North Country | Previously Volunteer Lifeboat at St Andrews. |
| Pre-354 | Polly and Lucy | 1859 | 1873–1881 | 32-foot Peake Self-righting (P&S) | Previously at St Andrews. |
| – | John and James Mills | 1881 | 1881–1891 | 31-foot Self-righting (P&S) | (Note: 31-foot x 8-foot 8in (10-oared) self-righting (P&S) lifeboat, gift of Mr James Mills of Dundee, built by David Livie of Dundee, costing £600, (£700 including launch carriage).); Lifeboat remained at the station until 1917. |

Station Closed, 1891

== See also ==
- List of RNLI stations
- List of former RNLI stations
- Royal National Lifeboat Institution lifeboats
