= Crail pottery =

Family-run pottery in Crail, Fife, Scotland

Crail Pottery
- Industry: Ceramics
- Founded: 1965
- Founders: Stephen Grieve; Carol Grieve
- Headquarters: Crail, Fife, Scotland, United Kingdom
- Products: Earthenware, stoneware, raku, terracotta planters
- Website: crailpottery.com

Crail Pottery is a family-run pottery and ceramics workshop and retailer in the village of Crail, in the East Neuk of Fife, Scotland. It was founded in 1965 by Stephen and Carol Grieve and has been featured in regional and national press as a longstanding craft business and visitor attraction in Crail.

== History ==
Stephen and Carol Grieve established Crail Pottery in 1965 after acquiring and renovating a pair of derelict buildings in the village; early accounts describe the couple living on site in a small caravan while teaching themselves kiln firing and production techniques. By the late 1990s the business operated as a family co-operative on the same site, with the founders' adult children developing their own lines alongside the original pottery. A 2020 profile also notes participation by a third generation of the family.

Carol Grieve died in 2019; by 2024 the business was described as continuing under the family following the death of Stephen Grieve as well.

== Operations and products ==
Crail Pottery produces hand-thrown ceramics including stoneware, hand-painted earthenware, raku pieces and terracotta planters, made and fired on site in workshops around a central courtyard. Techniques documented in press profiles include the use of gas and electric kilns and glazing approaches developed in-house; the studio also features separate family ranges (such as North Sea Blue, thistle and tartan motifs, and porcelain lines) produced under the cooperative arrangement.

== Reception and coverage ==
The pottery has been highlighted in travel and lifestyle coverage of Crail and the East Neuk as a place to watch ceramics being made and to browse the courtyard display. In a round-up of Scottish makers, The Scotsman's food and drink desk also featured Crail Pottery's contemporary earthenware ranges. A 2024 feature in ArtMag profiled the site's history, studio set-up and visitor experience. The Times has described Crail Pottery as one of the village's best-known businesses in its coverage of the area.

== Location ==
The pottery is located on Nethergate in central Crail (KY10 3TX).

== See also ==
- Scottish pottery
- East Neuk
