= Crail Golfing Society =

- Interactive map of Crail Golfing Society

Club information
- Location: Crail, Fife, Scotland
- Established: February 1786
- Tota holes: 36
- Website: crailgolfingsociety.co.uk

Balcomie Links
- Designed by: Tom Morris
- Par: 69
- Length: 5861 yards
- Course rating: 70

Craighead Links
- Designed by: Gil Hanse
- Par: 72
- Length: 6651 yards
- Course rating: 74

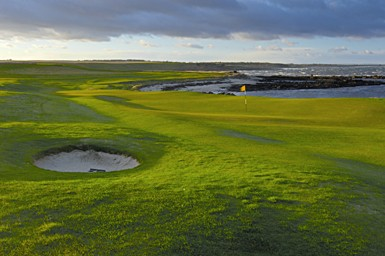
3rd Green of Balcomie, with 4th fairway beyond

14th green, Craighead Links

The Crail Golfing Society is a Scottish golf club established in February 1786 in the Golf Hotel, Crail, Fife. The society is the seventh oldest golf club in the world. Its oldest course, Balcomie, was formally laid out by Old Tom Morris in 1894, but competitions were played there since the 1850s.

The courses are two miles (three kilometres) northeast of the fishing town of Crail, and the land upon which golf is played straddles the easternmost promontory of Fife, known as Fife Ness. The East Coast of Fife is particularly dense in links courses and is popular for golf tourism. Crail is 10 miles (16 kilometres) south of St Andrews and four miles (six kilometres) from Kingsbarns. To the south west are the links of Elie, Anstruther, Lundin and Leven. Within an hour to the north are Scotscraig, Carnoustie, Monifieth and Panmure.

Crail Golfing Society owns and operates two courses, Balcomie and Craighead, which differ in character. Balcomie, designed by Old Tom Morris in 1895, is a traditional links, retaining original holes, and a diverse and distinctive set of Par 3s. The 14th is the most photographed hole, a Par 3 with an elevated tee high above the beach dropping down to a heavily bunkered green. Longer holes, such as the 4th and 5th, feature doglegs around the sea edge. From Balcomie, on the north of the promontory, can be seen the mountain Lochnagar in the Balmoral estate, in addition to the Tay estuary, and much of eastern Scotland.

Craighead, designed by American architect Gil Hanse is longer, a modern links, with rolling greens, native walls and wildlife typical of the Fife coast. The two links are on north and south edges of Fifeness, respectively, and have different views. Craighead allows views to the Forth Estuary and beyond, with the Bass Rock, Edinburgh and St Abbs Head visible 60 miles (100 kilometres) away, and borders a nature reserve.

== See also ==
- North Carr, a notorious reef extending out from the golf courses, on which many ships were wrecked
- George Learmonth of Balcomie (d. 1585) local landowner
