= Crail Castle =

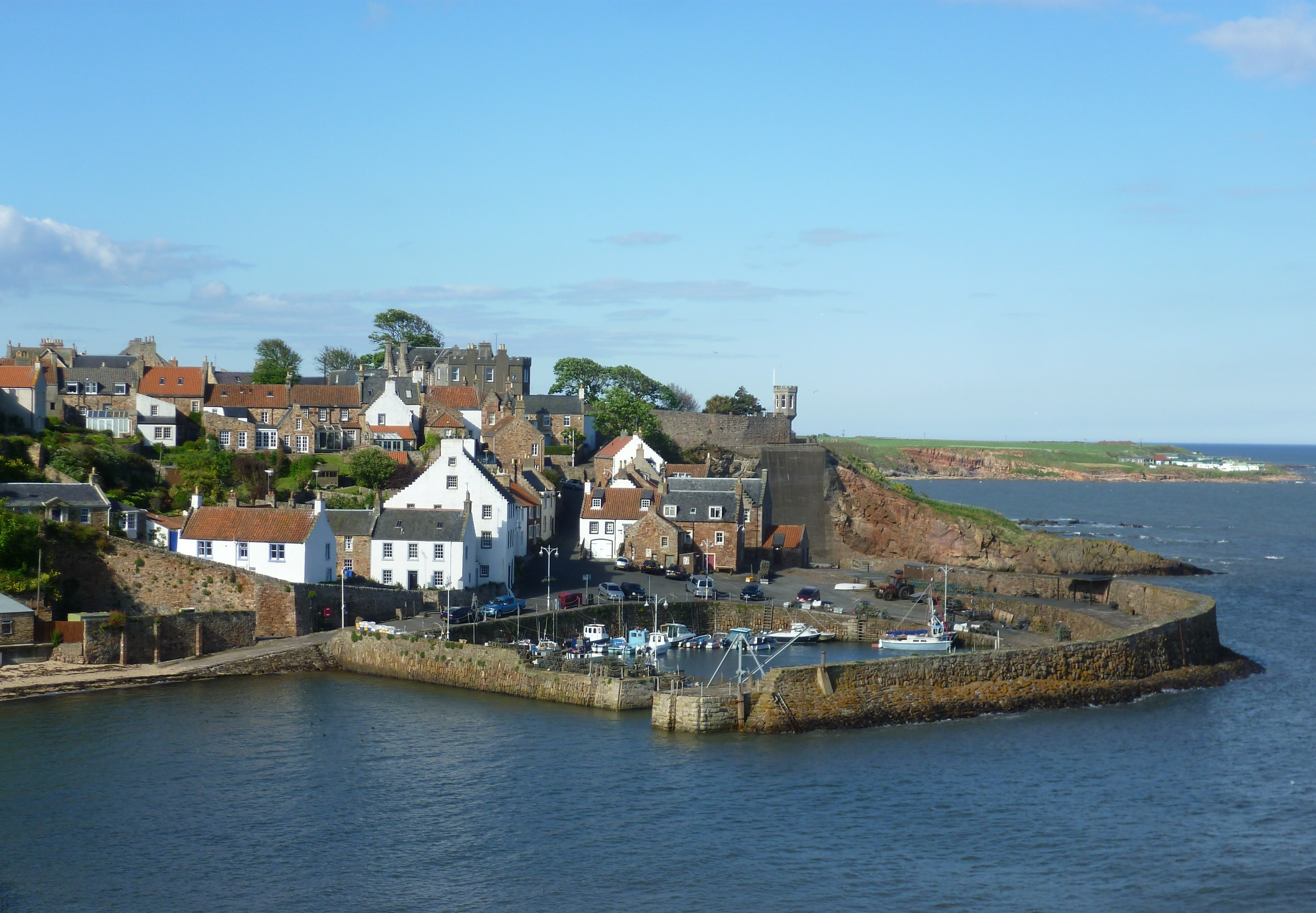
- Supposed location of Crail Castle

Location
- Coordinates: 56.258147°N 2.62626°W

Crail Castle was a castle that was located in Crail, Fife, Scotland. Crail became a Royal Burgh in the 12th century. The castle was frequented by King David I of Scotland during his reign in the early 12th century and a receipt for its repair survives dated 1264. Ada de Warenne obtained Crail as part of her marriage settlement with Prince Henry of Scotland. King Robert I of Scotland reconfirmed Crail's burgh status in 1306 and confirmed the constabulary of the castle to Lawrence de Weirmerstoun in 1310. Within the castle was a chapel dedicated to the Irish Saint Rufus.

A charter dated 1563 by Mary, Queen of Scots describes the castle as ruinous, with nothing remaining of it but its moat; it was to be given to David Spens of Wormistoun with permission to rebuild it. While it is uncertain if he or his heirs did so, an 1803 account of the site refers to "the ruins of a strong castle." The only visible remains of the castle is a 5.2-metre-long (17 ft 1 in) wall of rough mortared masonry located in Castle Garden (RO 6130 0747).
