= Fife Ness =

Headland and most eastern point of Fife, Scotland

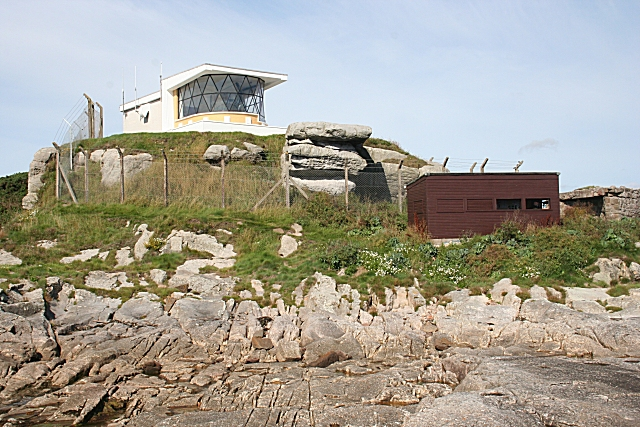
- Fife Ness Light, August 2008
- Location: Fife Ness, Crail, Fife, Scotland
- Coordinates: 56.278834°N 2.585789°W
- Constructed: 1975
- Construction: concrete building
- Height: 5 metres (16 ft)
- Shape: lantern attached to 1-storey building
- Markings: white building
- Operator: Northern Lighthouse Board

Light
- Focal height: 12 metres (39 ft)
- Range: White: 15 nautical miles (28 km; 17 mi); Red: 12 nautical miles (22 km; 14 mi)
- Characteristic: Iso WR 10s 12m 15-12M Fife Ness dome [Fl.5.0s - ec. 5.0s] [Sector(s): W. 143°-197°, R -217°, W 023°]

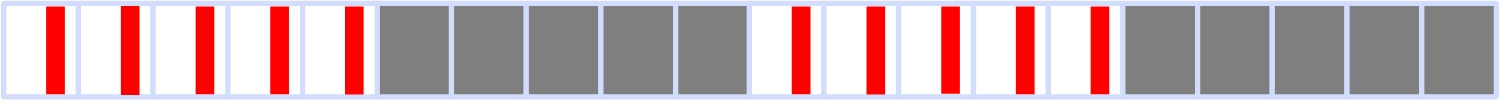
- Fife Ness band

Fife Ness (Scottish Gaelic: Rubha Fiobha) is a headland forming the most eastern point in Fife, Scotland. Anciently the area was called Muck Ross, which is a corruption of the Scottish Gaelic Muc-Rois meaning "Headland of the Pigs". It is situated in the area of Fife known as the East Neuk, and forms the muzzle of the dog-like outline of the latter when viewed on a map. Ness is a Scots word meaning "headland".

Fife Ness was home to a Coastguard station until 2012 and an important Northern Lighthouse Board lighthouse built in 1975 on project by P. H. Hyslop, warning shipping of the headland and the North Carr shoals. The lighthouse was built to replace the last in a series of lightvessels that guarded the treacherous rocks, as it had proved impossible to build a permanent lighthouse on the rocks themselves.

Fife Ness is also surrounded by the links terrain of Crail Golfing Society.

== See also ==
- List of lighthouses in Scotland
- List of Northern Lighthouse Board lighthouses
