= North Carr =

Sandstone reef on the headland between the Firth of Forth and St Andrews Bay

Coordinates: 56°17′23″N 2°34′54″W

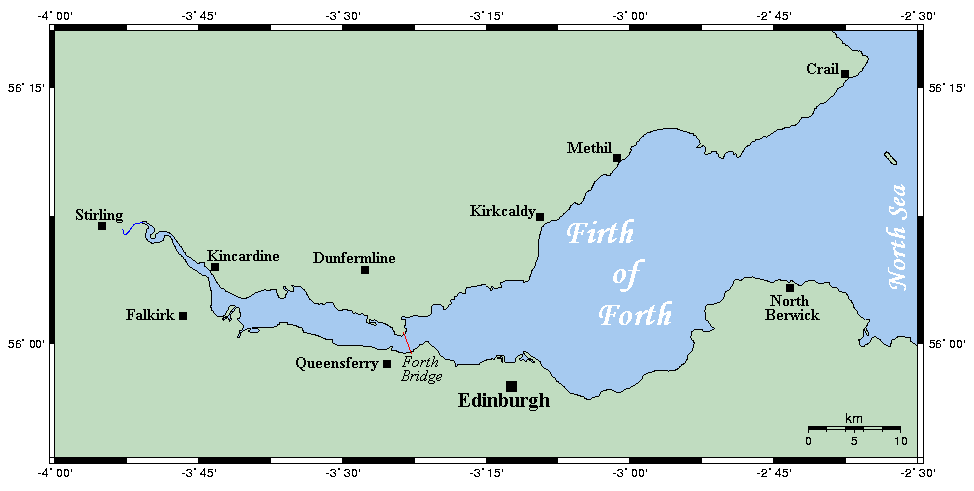
North Carr is NE of Crail, at the mouth of the Firth of Forth

The Carr (also known as Carr Briggs and Carr Rock) is a sandstone reef on the headland between the Firth of Forth and St Andrews Bay. There have been many ships wrecked on the reef, which lies on the busy shipping lanes into the Forth ports and the River Tay.

A buoy was first placed on the reef, at North Carr, in 1809. After much difficulty a more permanent, unlit, beacon was completed by Robert Stevenson in 1821. Between 1877 and 1975 the beacon was supplemented by a series of lightships. The beacon still stands to this day, but the reef is now guarded by the Fife Ness lighthouse on the mainland.

== Description ==
The reef extends for 1.5 miles (2.4 km) northeastwards from Fife Ness Points Coastguard station (East Coast Fife) into the North Sea and the greater Firth of Forth. It is made up of some fourteen sandstone rocks that are completely submerged at high tide. These include Englishman's Skelly, Kneestone, Tullybothy Craigs, Lochaber Rock and Mary's Skelly.

Carr is a Scots term for a coastal rock, found as an element in the names of reefs and small islands in south-east Scotland and north-east England. It may have entered Old English from a Celtic source; compare carra or carraig in Gaelic, terms for a ledge or projecting rock.

== History ==
Shipwrecks around the reef include the schooner Louise; the trawlers James Ross & Festing Grindall; the tanker Vildfugl; the brig Andreas; the paddle steamer Commodore; the coaster Island Magee; the cargo steamer Einar Jarl & Bjornhaug.

A buoy was first placed by the Northern Lighthouse Board in 1809, but this was found to be inadequate and would wreck in winter storms. The remains can still be seen of a second project, the North Carr Beacon. This was started in 1813 by Robert Stevenson, a famous lighthouse engineer. Stevenson had just finished the Bell Rock Lighthouse and was about to start a new lighthouse on the Isle of May, 8 miles to the south of North Carr. Since North Carr was barely uncovered even at low tide, work could proceed on only two or three tides each fortnight, so the plan was to work on it when conditions allowed and switch the men to the Isle of May at other times.

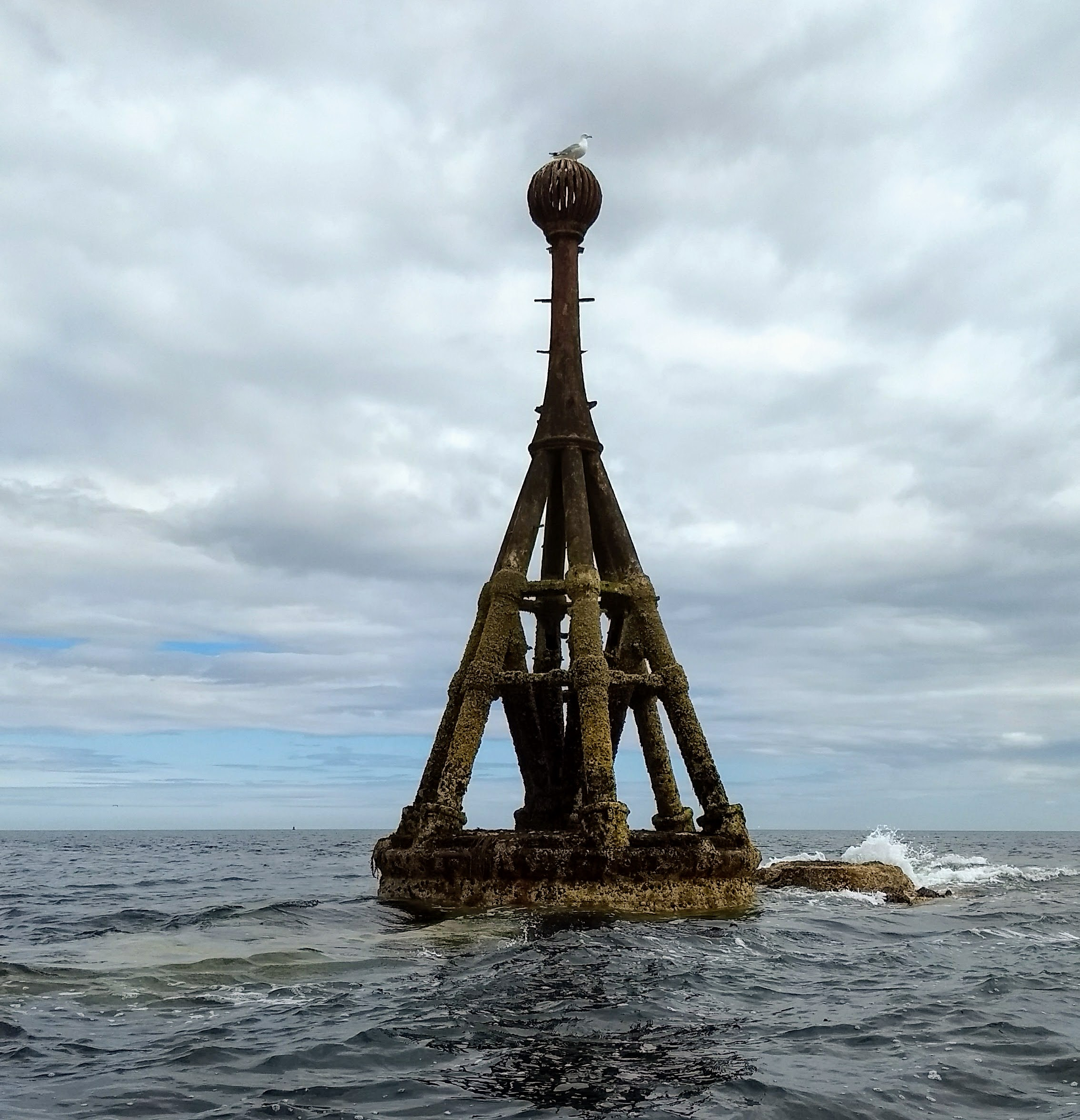
North Carr Beacon of 1821

Stevenson planned a 40 feet (12 m) hollow tower topped by a bell. The bell would be rung by an ingenious mechanism powered by the tide. The foundations of North Carr were confined to just 18 feet (5.5 m) of fractured sandstone, a limited "toehold" compared even to Bell Rock (42 feet (13 m)) and whilst it was under construction parts of the structure were swept away in storms in 1815, 1816 and 1817. In 1817 the tower had been nearly complete when it was reduced to the fifth course of stones, so the design was changed to a pyramidal structure of cast iron columns with a ball on top. This was completed in 1821; £5,000 had been spent in total.

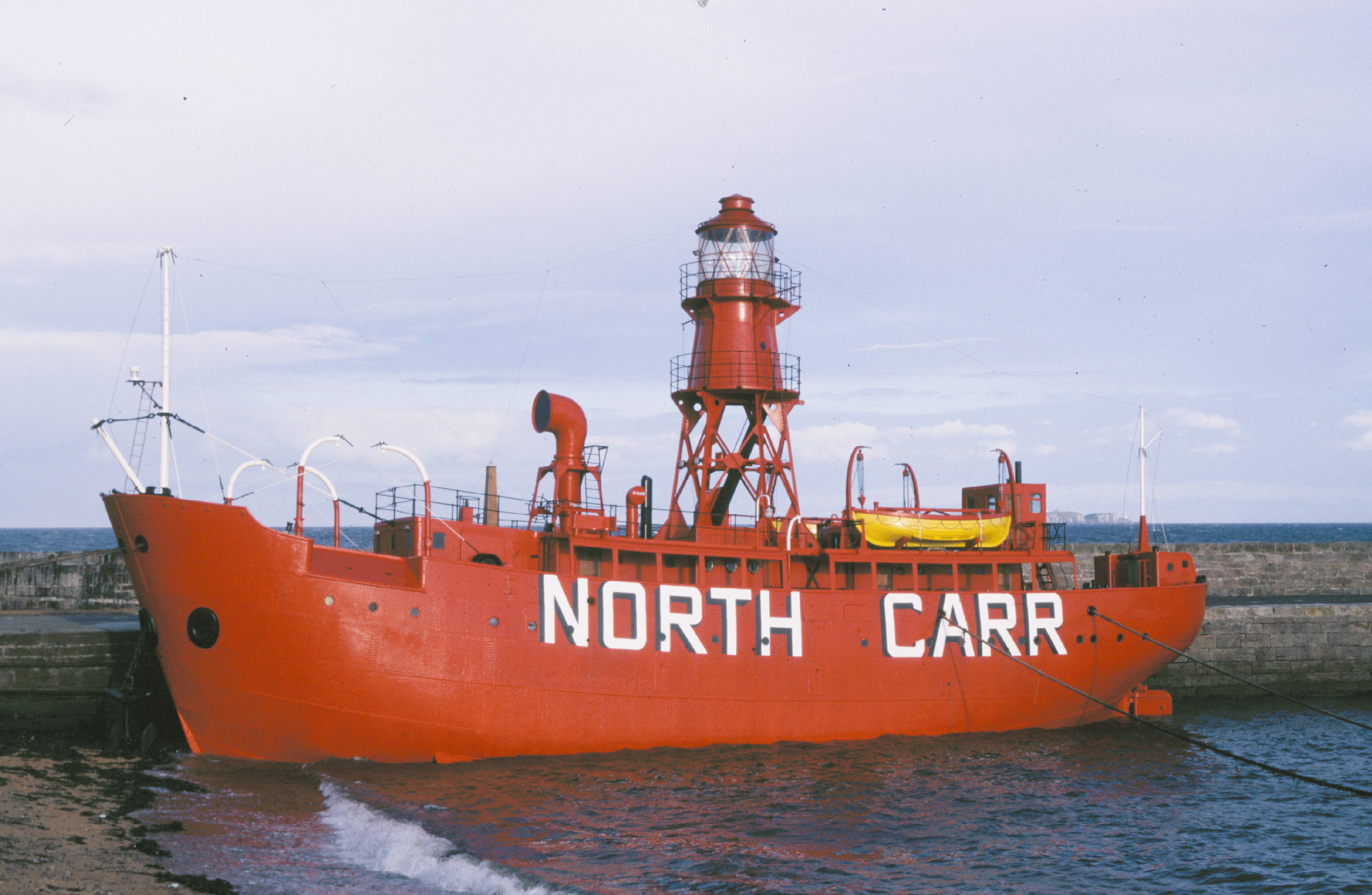
The North Carr Lightship moored at Anstruther in 1988

A lightship on loan from Trinity House joined the beacon on 7 June 1887, located one mile off North Carr. The 8 feet (240 cm) fixed light could be seen for 11 miles (18 km). Two years later it was replaced by a ship purpose-built for the Northern Lighthouse Board by Alexander Stephen and Sons of Dundee. This was sold in 1933 and replaced by a vessel built by A. & J. Inglis of Glasgow. This had a 1000W electric light, fixed at first and later flashing twice every half minute. It was moved to the mouth of the Clyde during World War II. The lightship broke adrift from her moorings in a gale on 8 December 1959 and all eight crew members of the Broughty Ferry lifeboat died trying to rescue her. The crew of the lightship managed to set anchor off Kingsbarns and were taken off by helicopter the next day but the ship was not taken under tow until 11 December. The lightship was replaced by a lighted buoy in 1975, at the same time as a lighthouse was built at Fife Ness on the mainland. The lightship was saved from the scrapyard in 2010 and funds are being sought by the Taymara charity to restore her as an exhibition space on the Dundee waterfront.

== Visiting ==
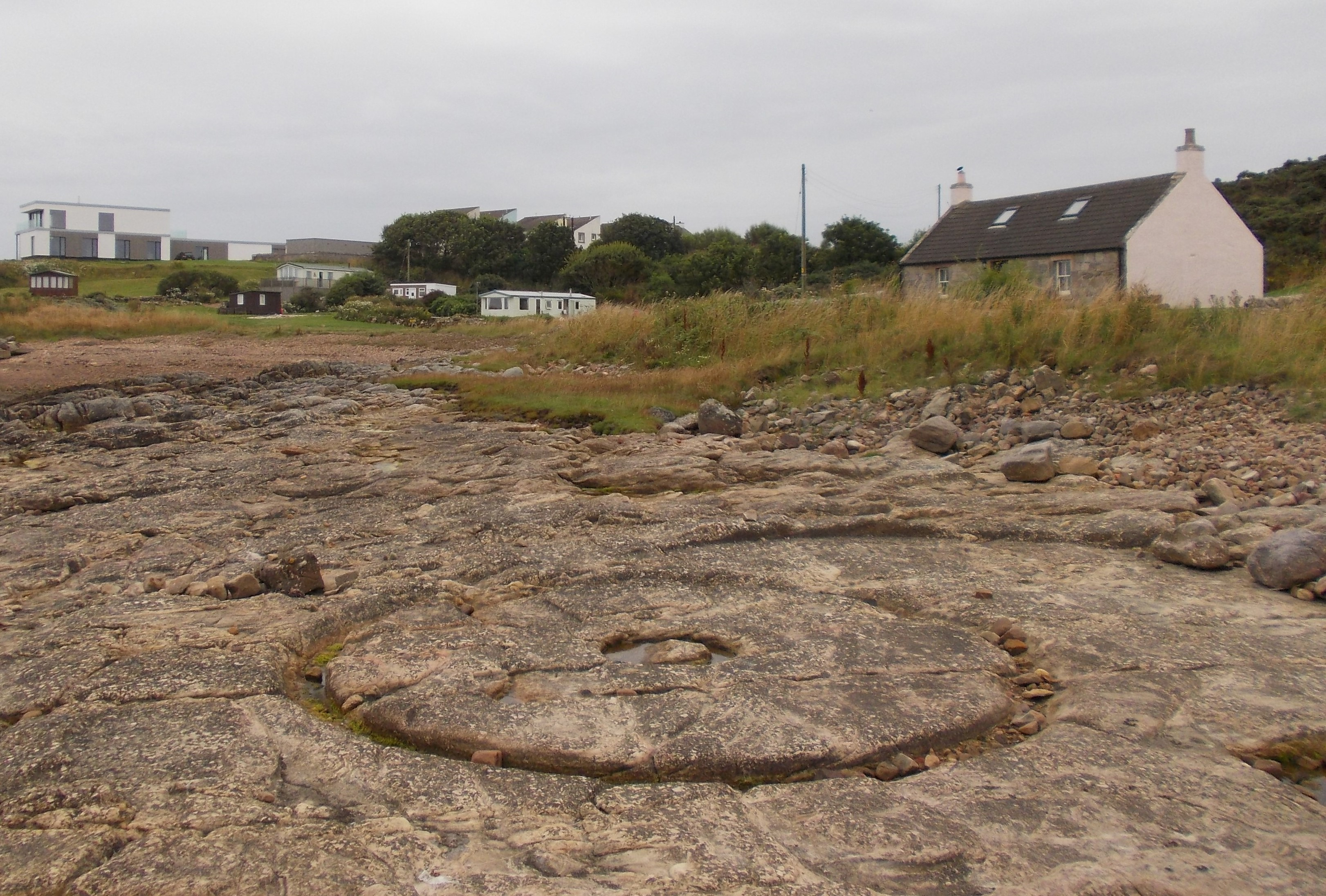
Site where the stone blocks for the beacon were checked for fitting.

Visitors can park in the Crail Golfing Society carpark and follow the track that leads to the lighthouse and Coastguard Station. The North Carr rocks are only visible at low tide. When Stevenson was building the beacon, the stone blocks were cut and checked for fitting on the foreshore here prior to being shipped out to the reef. The bedrock was levelled to form a base for the first course of blocks and a higher course. These circular outlines can still be seen cut into the rock on the shore, as can the nearby remains of the quay where the finished blocks were loaded onto the workboat. Pods of dolphin and less frequently whales can be seen from the shore, with the aid of binoculars.
