= Crail =

Coastal village in Fife, Scotland

Coordinates: 56.2608°N 2.6263°W

Crail: Scottish Gaelic: Cathair Aile
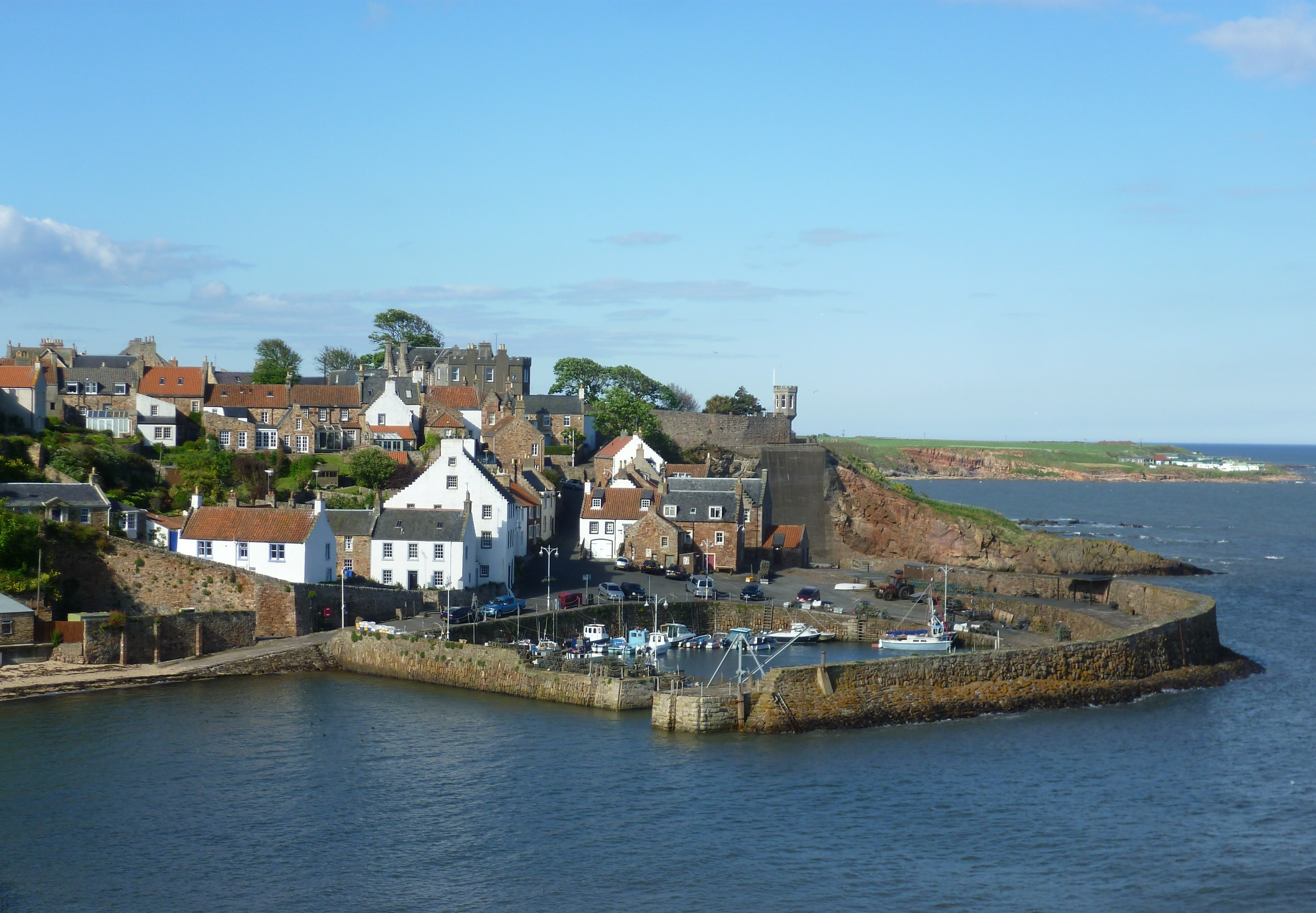
- Crail harbour

- Location within Fife
- Population: 1,640 (2020)
- OS grid reference: NO613078
- Council area: Fife
- Lieutenancy area: Fife
- Country: Scotland
- Sovereign state: United Kingdom
- Post town: ANSTRUTHER.
- Postcode district: KY10
- Dialling code: 01333
- Police: Scotland
- Fire: Scottish
- Ambulance: Scottish
- UK Parliament: North East Fife
- Scottish Parliament: North East Fife

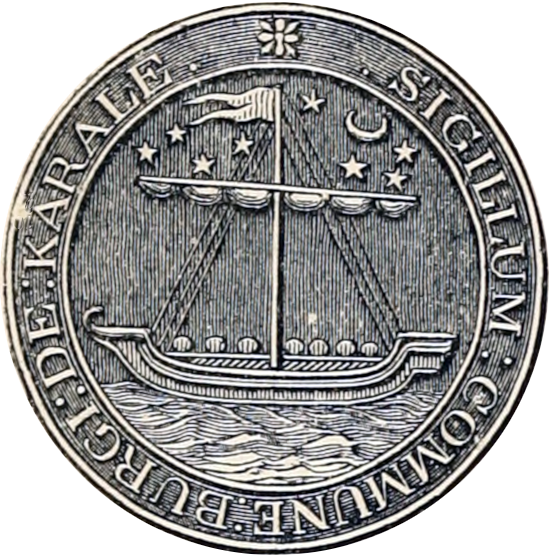
seal of Crail

Crail (Scottish Gaelic: Cathair Aile) is a coastal town, royal burgh and community council area (Royal Burgh of Crail and District) in the East Neuk of Fife, Scotland.

The locality has an estimated population of 1,630 (2018).

== Etymology ==
The name Crail was recorded in 1148 as Cherel and in 1153 as Karel. The first element is the Pictish *cair (cf. Welsh caer) meaning "fort", though this word seems to have been borrowed into Gaelic. The second element may be either Gaelic ail, "rocks", or more problematically Pictish *al; no certain instance of this word exists in P-Celtic. However, if the generic element were Pictish, then this is likely of the specific.

== History ==
The site on which the parish church is built appears to have religious associations that pre-date the parish church's foundation in early medieval times, as evidenced by an 8th-century cross-slab preserved in the church. The parish church was itself dedicated (in the 13th-century) to the early holy man St. Maelrubha of Applecross in Wester Ross.

Crail Castle was an occasional residence of David I of Scotland during the 12th century but subsequently fell into ruin.

Crail became a royal burgh in 1178 during the reign of King William the Lion. Robert the Bruce granted permission to hold markets on a Sunday.

Mary of Guise, afterward consort of James V, landed in Crail in June 1538 after a severe storm, and was hospitably entertained in the ancient mansion of Balcomie Castle, whence, accompanied by the king, she proceeded to St. Andrew's.

John Knox, visiting Crail on his way to St Andrews in 1559, was moved to deliver a sermon in Crail Parish Church. Afterwards, protesters went through the church and destroyed idols and images. In August 1583, many of the inhabitants of Crail attacked nearby Wormiston House, which belonged to Sir John Anstruther. They filled up newly made ponds and ditches, and destroyed a plantation of ash trees. They were vexed at Anstruther because his new ditches had been built on land they claimed to belong to them as common land. The Privy Council of Scotland ordered them to rebuild the dykes.

Although the nature of the fishing in Crail was different from that in Anstruther and Pittenweem, involving more local fishing and an emphasis on shellfish, Crail continued to prosper as a fishing port in the years leading up to the First World War.

Fishery Statistics

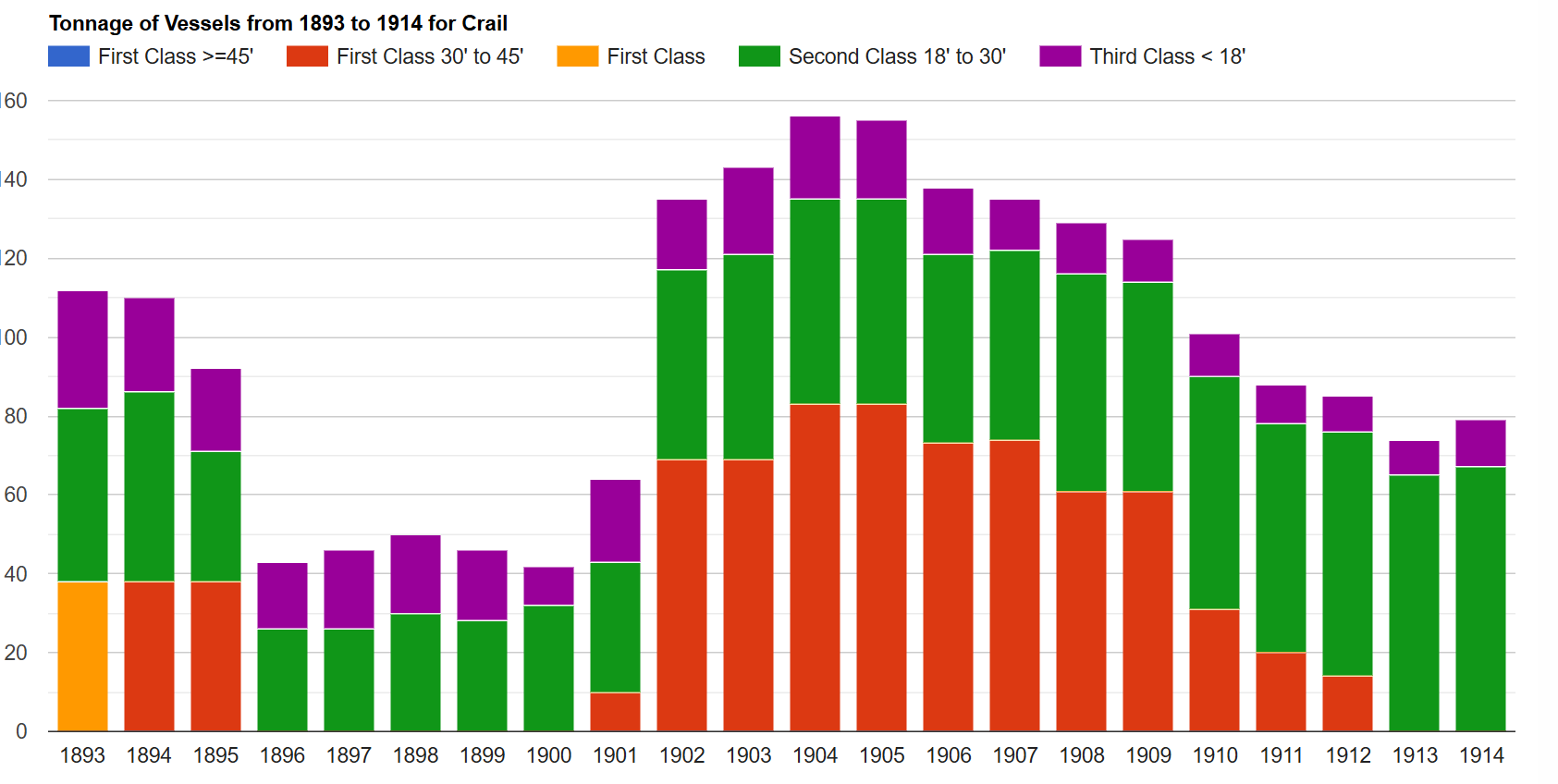
Tonnage of vessels

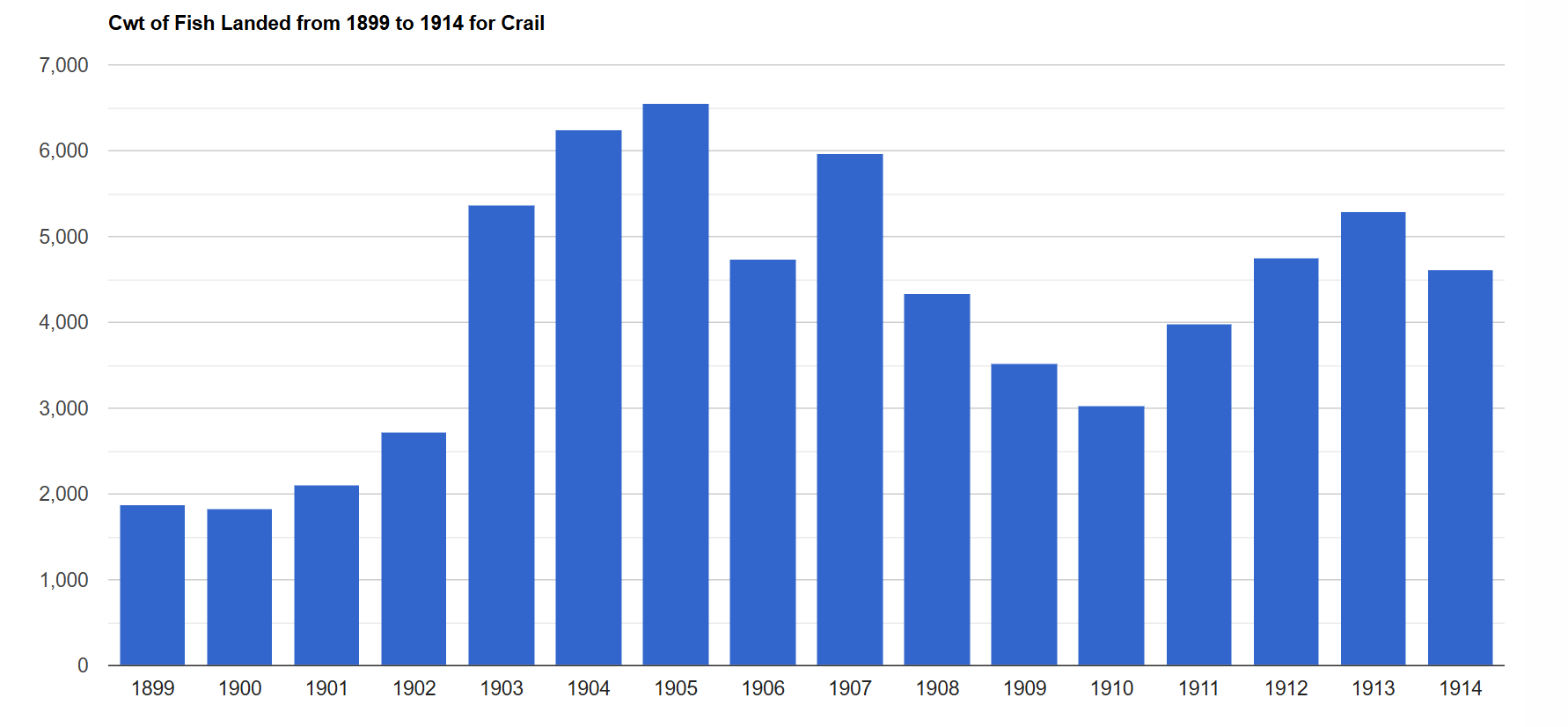
Cwt of fish landed

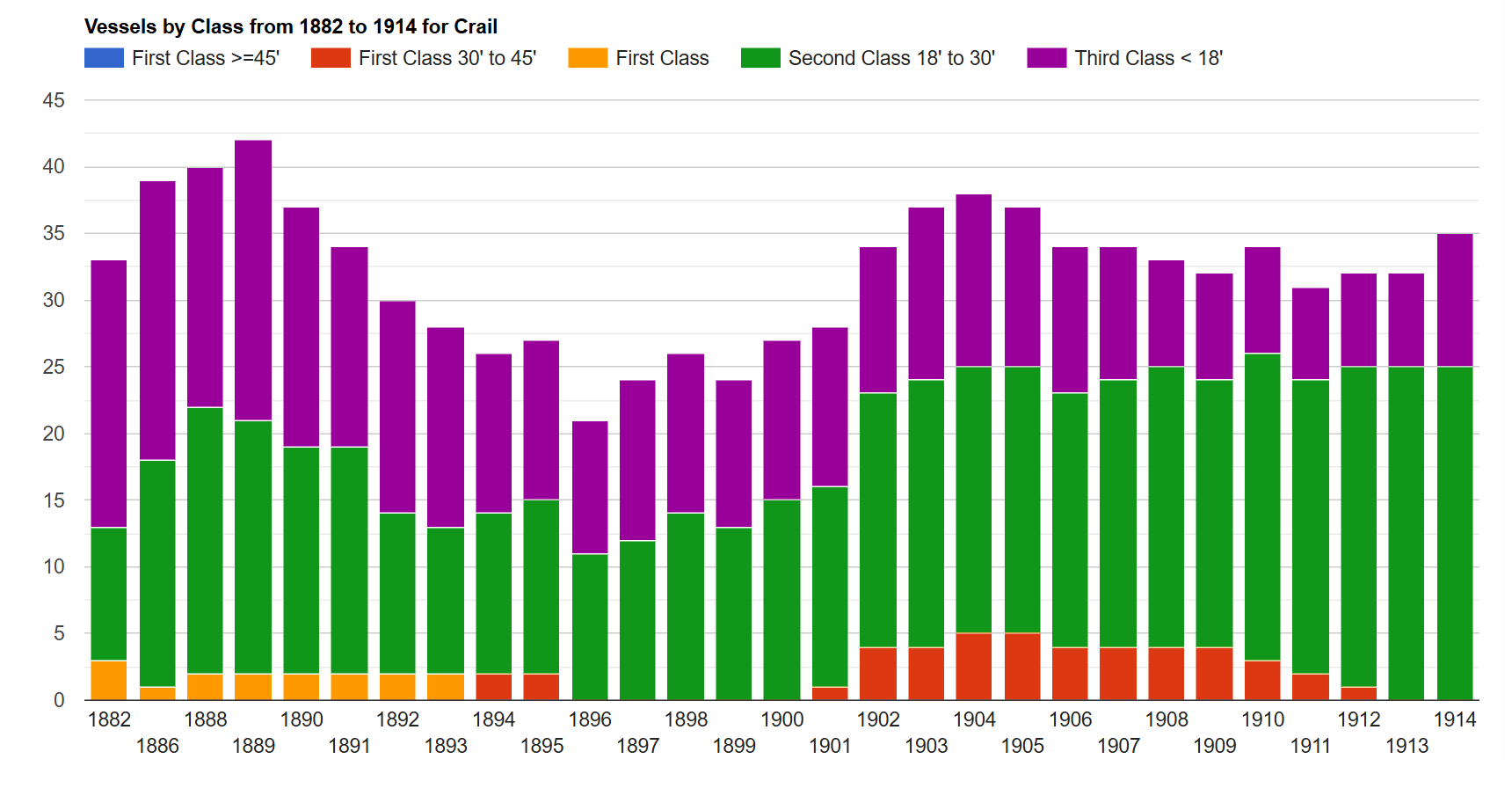
Vessels by class

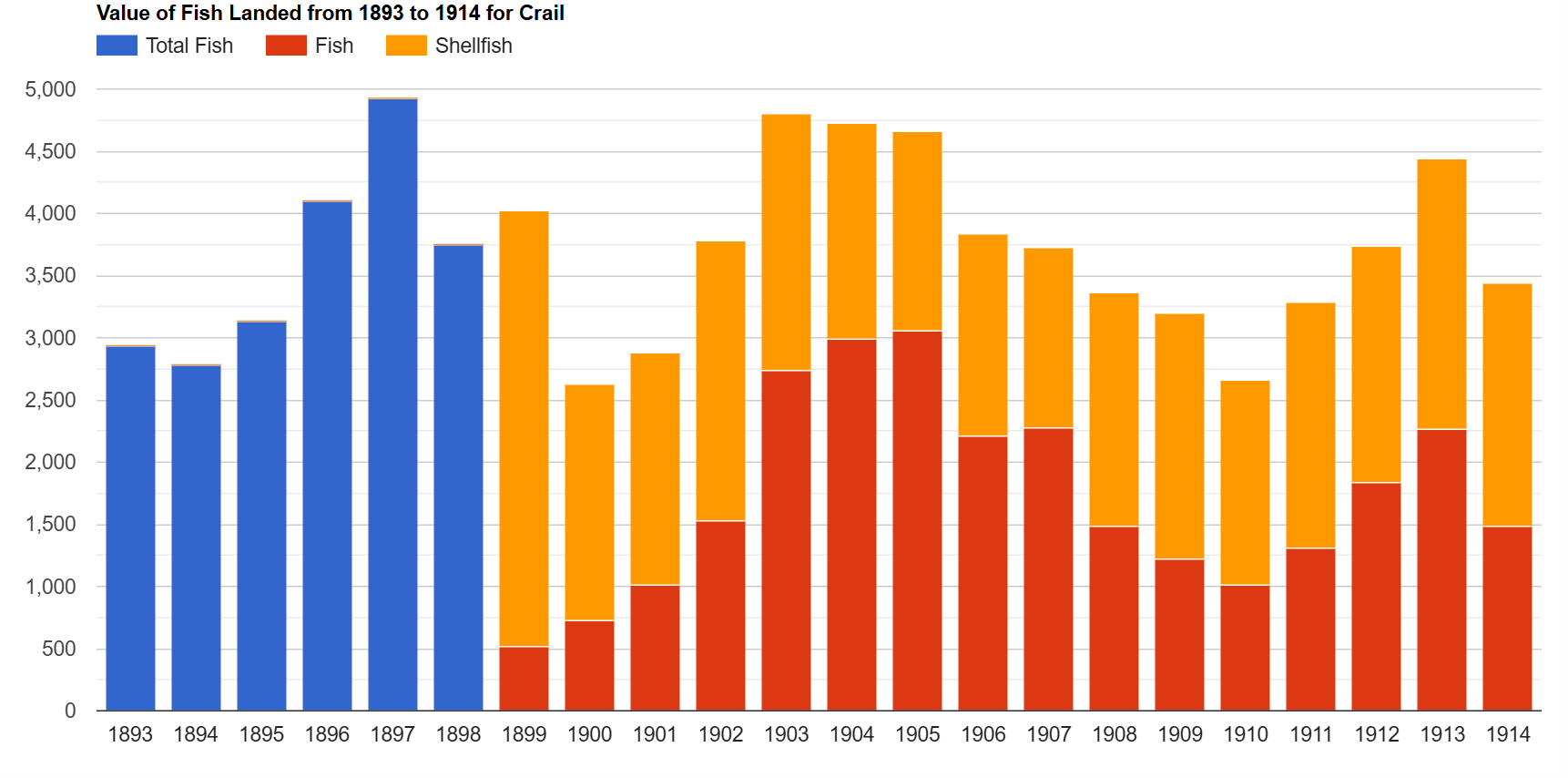
Value (£) of fish landed

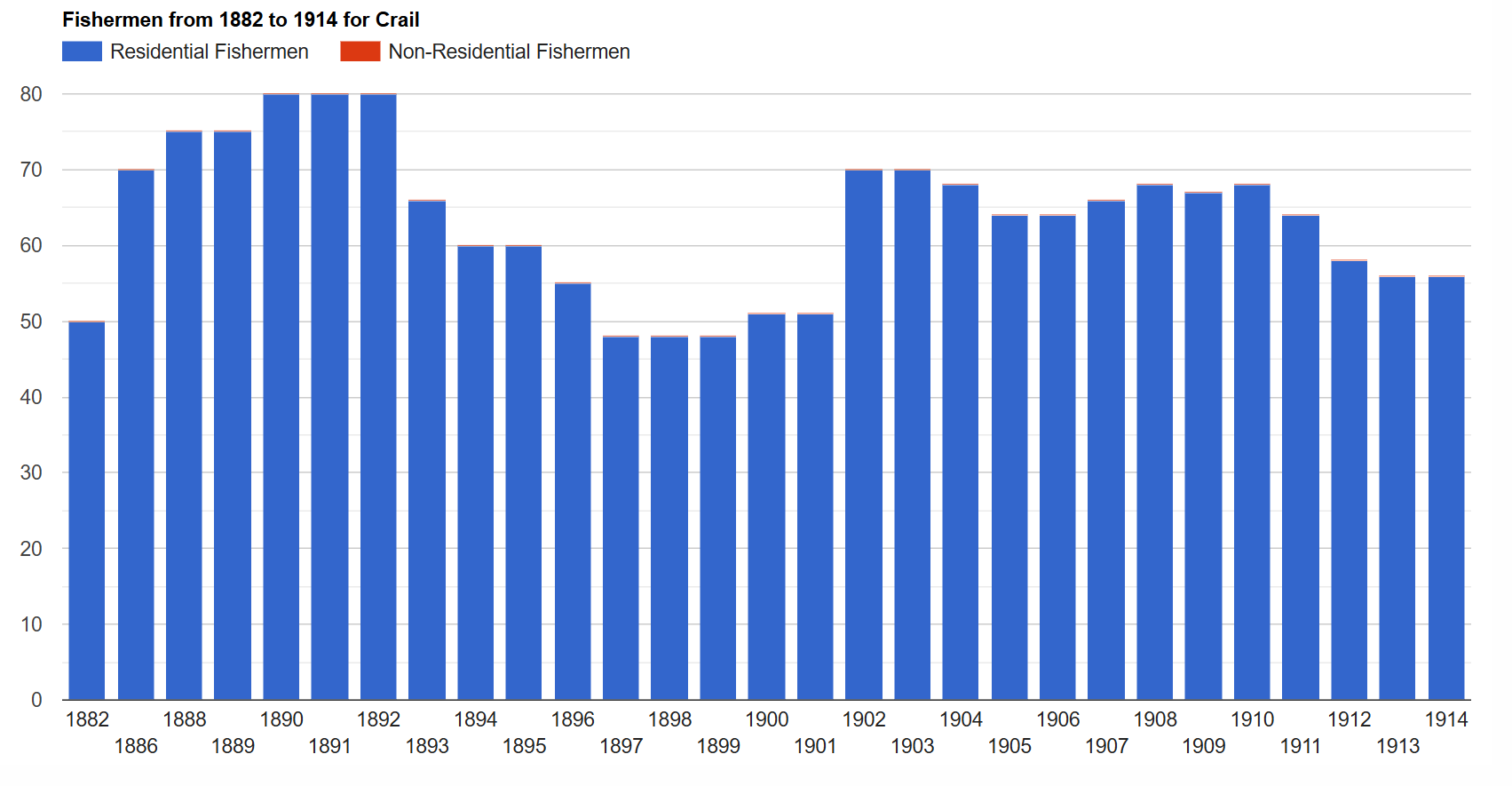
Fishermen

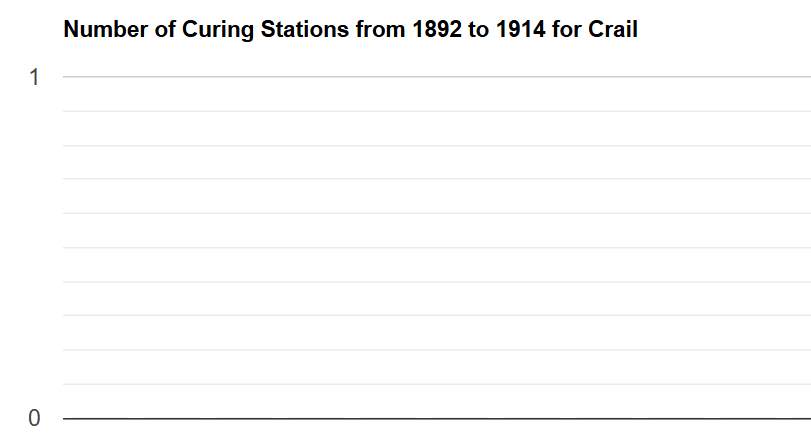
Placeholder-no curing stations

In 2017, the Community Council was granted the Letters Patent to the Crail Shield and Coat of Arms. This was lost when the Royal Burgh of Crail Council was abolished in 1976.

== Architecture ==
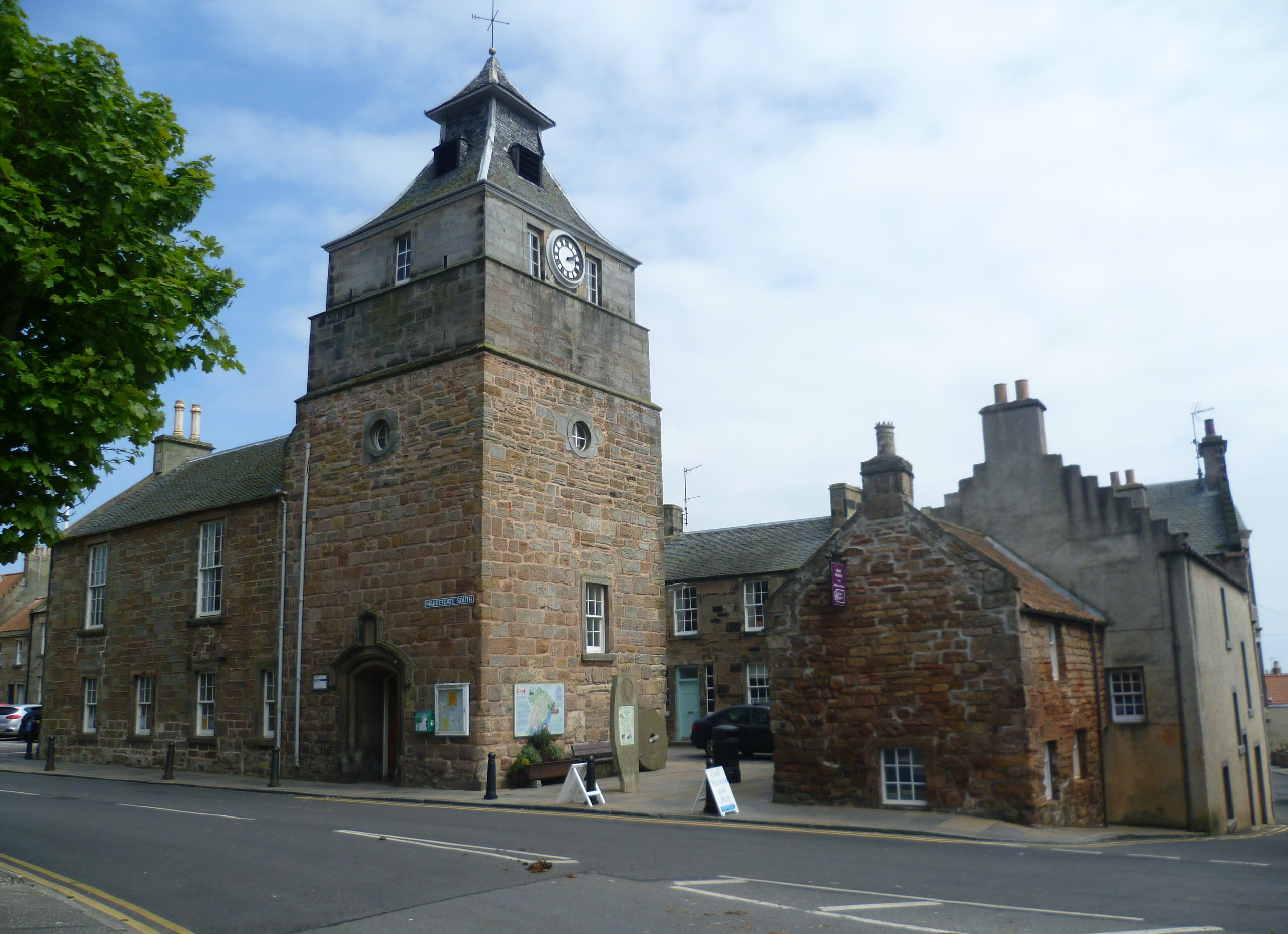
Crail Tolbooth (on the left)

The most notable building in the town is the parish church, situated in the Marketgate – from the mid-13th century St Maelrubha's, in later medieval times St Mary's, but now, as part of the Church of Scotland's ministry, known just as Crail Parish Church. It was founded in the second half of the 12th century. From early in its history, it belonged to the Cistercian Nunnery of St Clare in Haddington, East Lothian, and remained the Nunnery's possession until the Reformation. The kirkyard also includes a war memorial gateway of 1921.

Crail Tolbooth is near the juncture of Tolbooth Wynd and the Marketgate. It stands on its own at the edge of the large marketplace with its Mercat cross in the centre of the town. This is where the Sunday markets were once held. (The former marketplace is now used as a car park.) The tolbooth has a characteristic tower dating from about 1600 and a European-style roof, similar to buildings in Holland. The weathervane on the spire is in the form of a smoked haddock (known locally as a Crail Capon) rather than the traditional cockerel form.

The Crail Museum and Heritage Centre, largely staffed by volunteers and open every day in summer, is sited in a neighbouring building, also of historical interest, at the top of Tolbooth Wynd. It houses temporary exhibitions and has a permanent exhibition on RNAS Crail.

The Golf Hotel, on High Street, is Category A listed, dating to the 18th century or earlier.

== Culture ==
In 1965, Crail Pottery, a family-run pottery and ceramics workshop and retailer, was founded in the locality by Stephen and Carol Grieve. The pottery has attracted attention from both local and national sources as a longstanding craft business and attraction.

== Harbour ==
In 1610, the eastern pier was described as "new foundit" (newly built); however, by 1707 it was called "old and ruinous", requiring rebuilding.

The west pier was rebuilt in 1828 by Robert Stevenson. This work incorporated the crane on the southwest corner which lifts timbers into slots to seal the inner harbour.

The structure of the inner walls of the harbour features a highly unusual vertical coursing of the stones.

== Notable residents ==
- Andrew Duncan, minister exiled for opposing the policies of James VI ( c.1560–1626)
- Joan Clarke, cryptanalyst and former fiancée of Alan Turing (1917–1996)
- King Creosote, singer-songwriter (1967–)
- William Dickson, footballer (1866–1910)
- James Oswald (1710–1769), composer
- James Sharp, became Archbishop of St Andrews (1618–1679)
- Oswald Wynd, author (1913–1998)

== Carboniferous fossils ==
On the beach beside the harbour, there are fossilised trees related to Horsetails, dating back to the Carboniferous geological period.

== Sport ==
The Crail Golfing Society, formed in 1766, is the seventh-oldest in the world. Their oldest course, Balcomie, was formally laid out by Tom Morris Sr. in 1894, but competitions had been played there since the 1850s.

== Public transport ==
Stagecoach East Scotland's bus service 95 from Leven to St Andrews via Pittenweem and Anstruther is the only bus service which serves Crail. The hourly service runs every day.

== Gallery ==
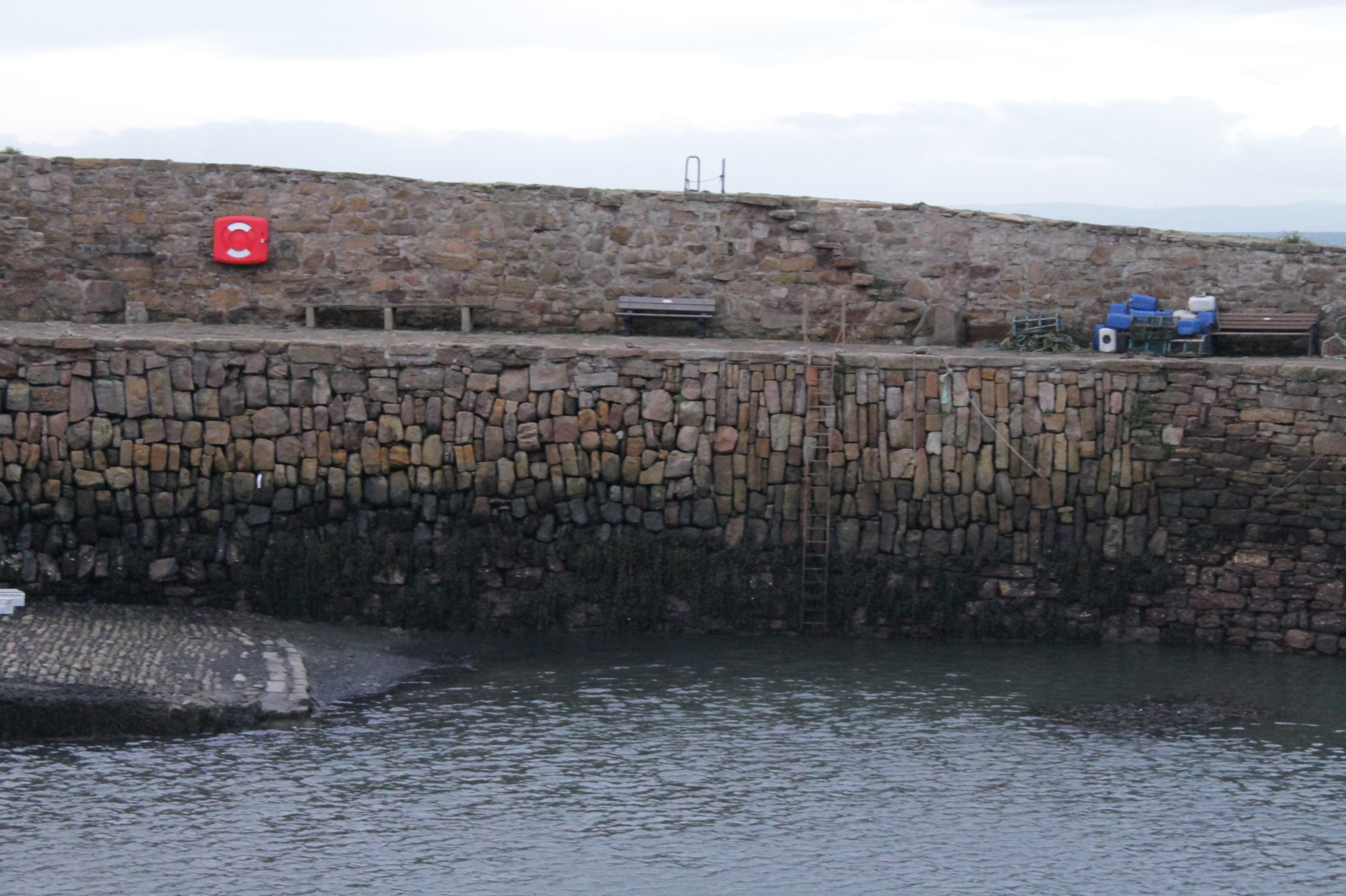
The unusual stonework at Crail Harbour

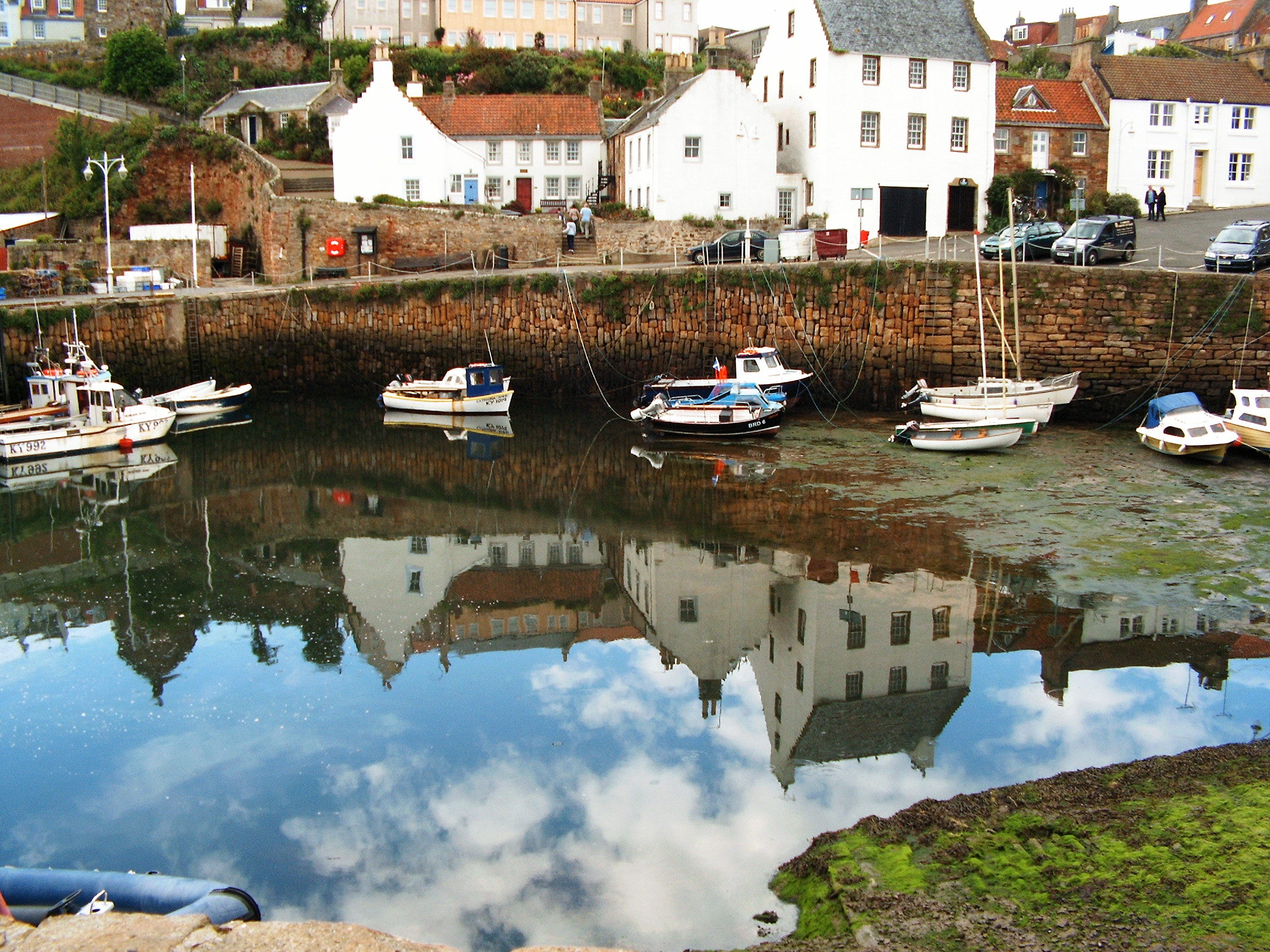
Crail Harbour

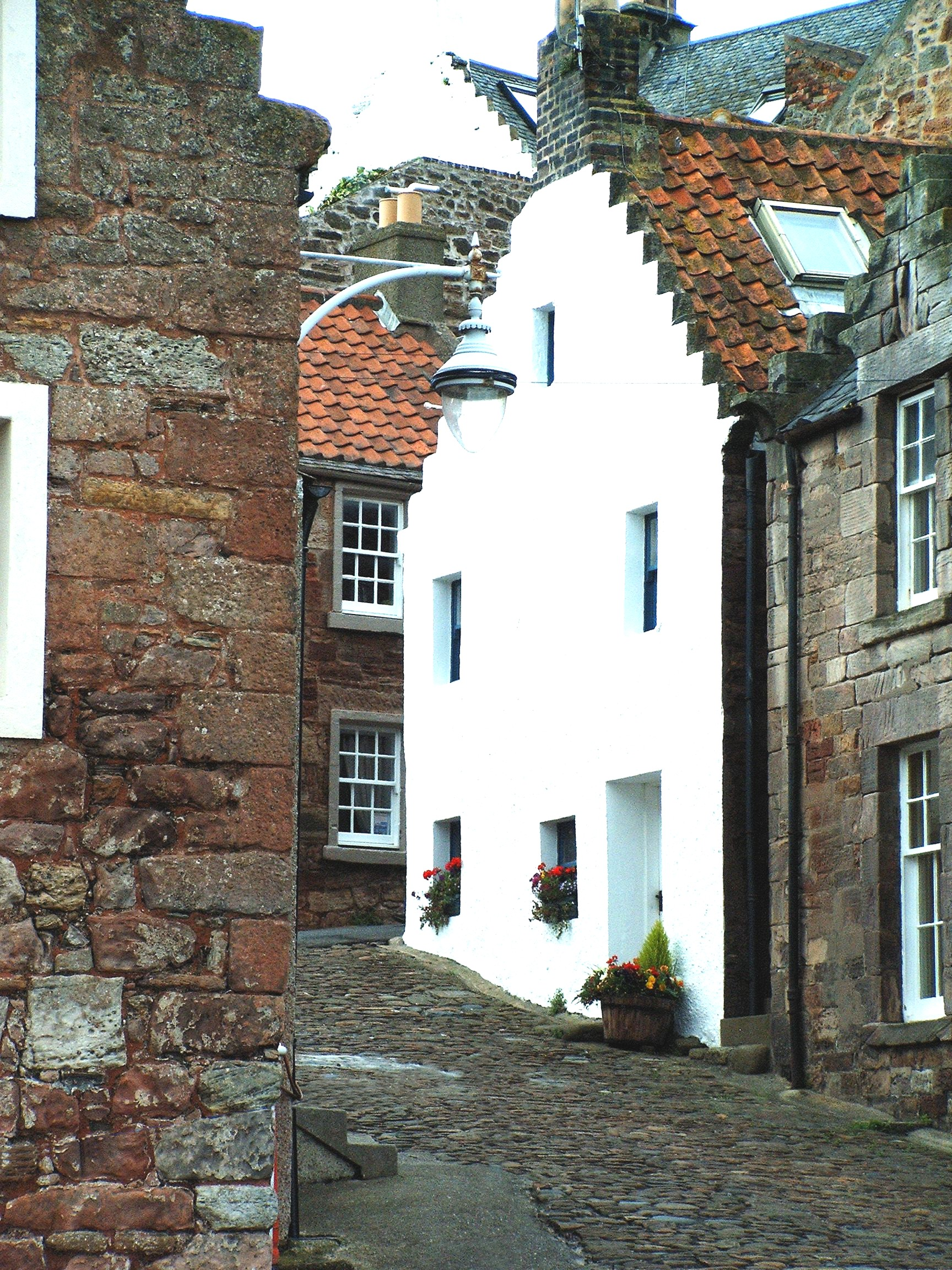
House near the harbour

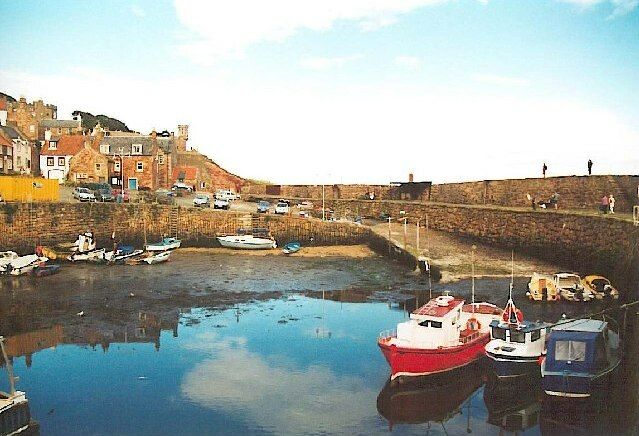
Crail Harbour

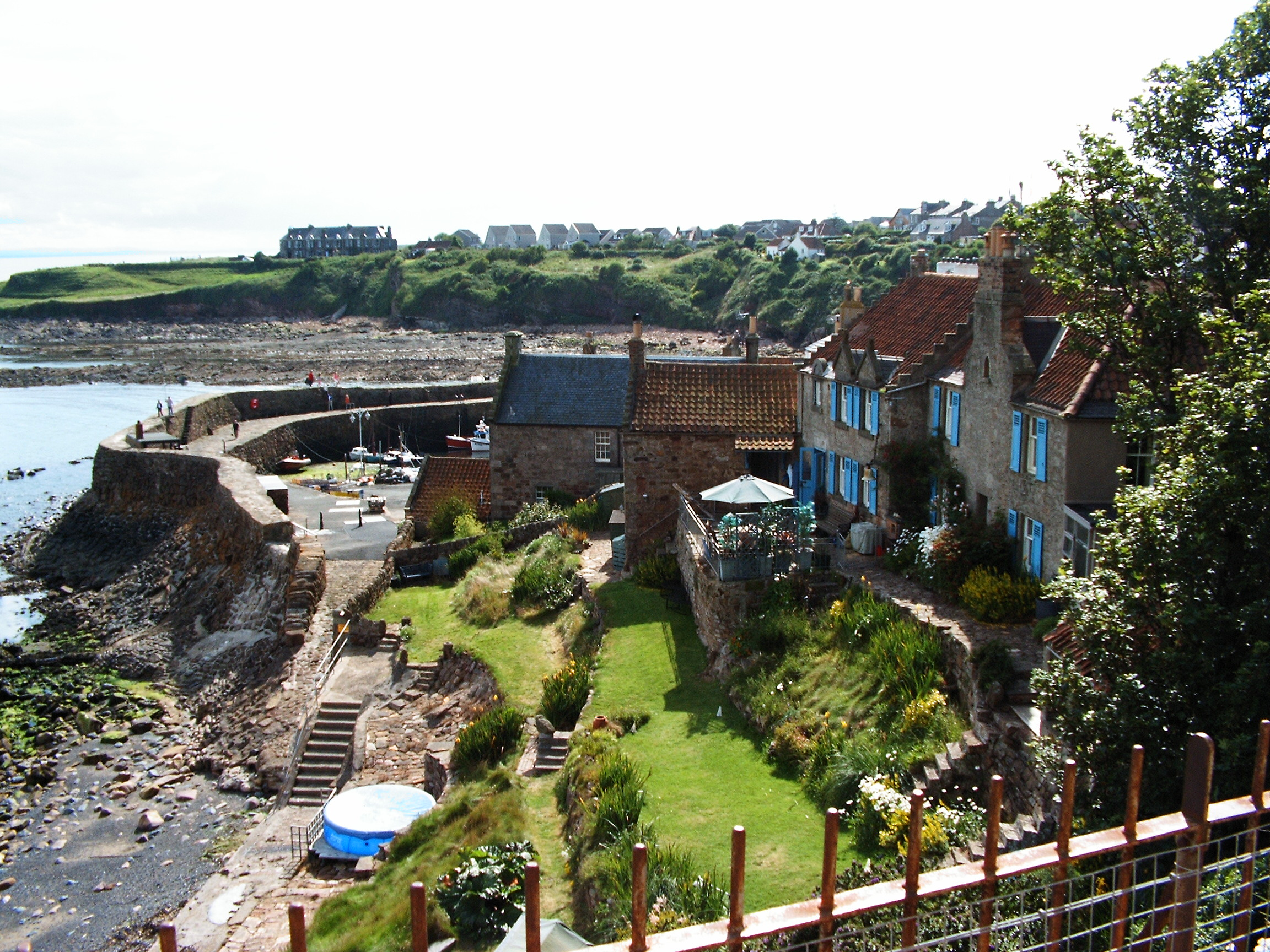
Viewing the harbour from above

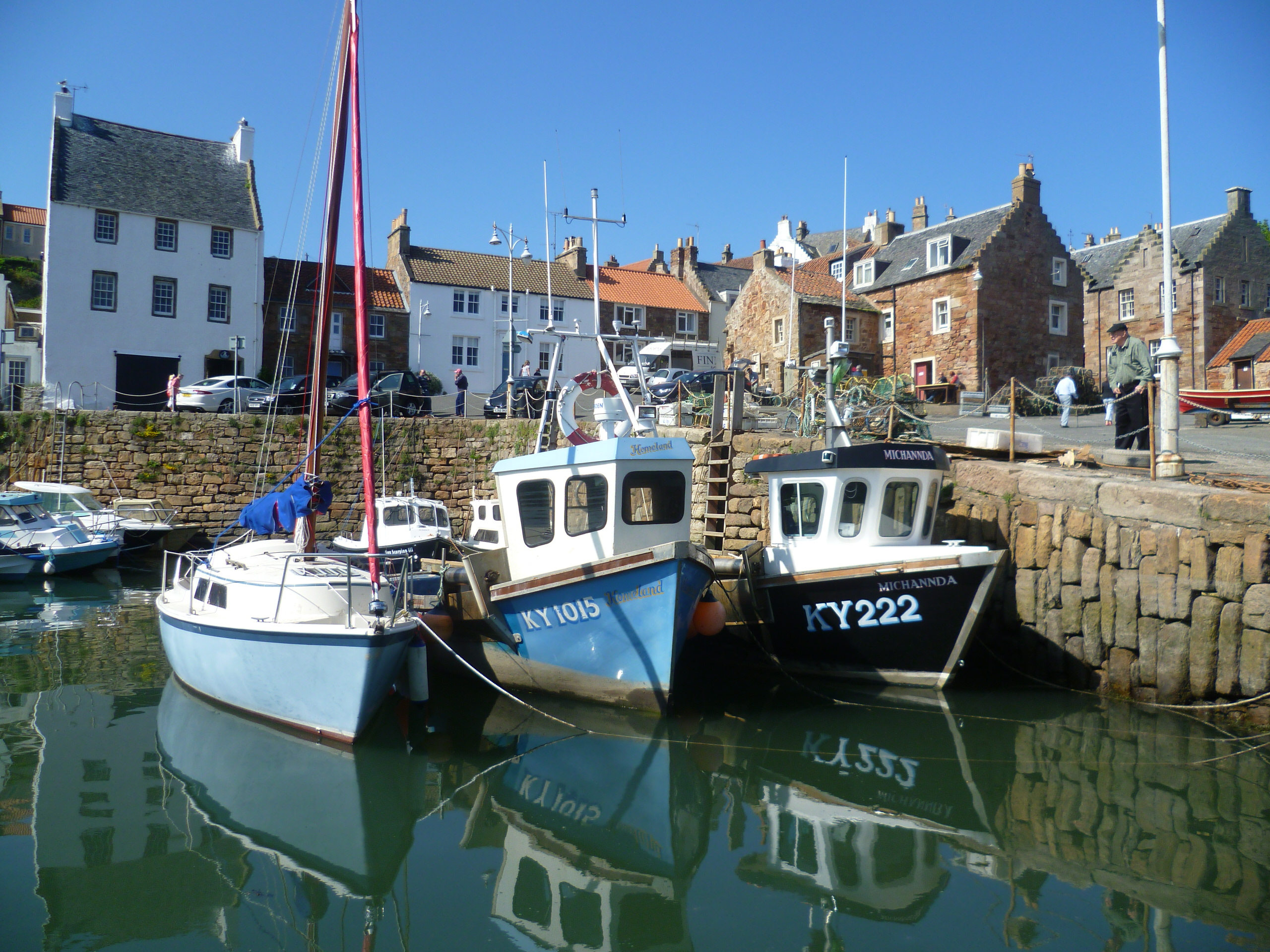
Boats in Crail Harbour
