= County Buildings, Lerwick =

County building in Lerwick, Scotland

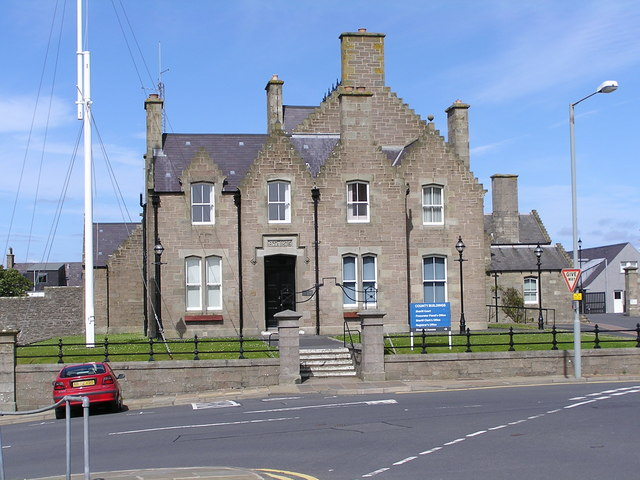
- County Buildings, Lerwick

- Shown in Shetland
- 60.1549°N 1.1471°W
- Location: King Erik Street, Lerwick

History
- Built: 1875

Site notes
- Architect: David Rhind
- Architectural style: Scottish baronial style

Listed Building – Category B
- Official name: County Buildings including Lerwick Sheriff Court House and Police Station, boundary walls, gatepiers and railings and excluding 2-storey concrete rendered block to north, Hillhead, Lerwick
- Designated: 18 October 1977
- Reference no.: LB37263

County Buildings is a municipal structure in King Erik Street, Lerwick, Shetland, Scotland. The structure, which is used as a judicial complex, is a Category B listed building.

== History ==
The first judicial facility in Lerwick was a medieval tolbooth in Commercial Street which was completed in the 17th century. After becoming dilapidated, it was demolished and replaced by a new tolbooth, which was built by the local masons, Robert and James Forbes, and completed in around 1770. The new tolbooth was used as a prison as well as a sheriff courthouse: however, in 1836, the prison inspector reported on the poor conditions in which prisoners were held and, by the mid-19th century, the justices were also seeking better facilities.

A site for the new building was identified in King Erik Street: it was designed by David Rhind in the Scottish baronial style, built by D. Outerson in ashlar stone, and completed in 1875. The design involved an asymmetrical main frontage with four bays facing onto King Erik Street with the central two bays slightly projected forward; the second bay on the left featured a doorway with a hood mould containing a date stone. On the ground floor, the first and third bays had two-light sash windows while the fourth bay had a single-light sash window. On the first floor, the bays, which were all surmounted by stepped gables, featured single-light sash windows. Internally, the main south-facing block contained office accommodation for the sheriff clerk, while additional blocks behind contained the sheriff court, a prison and the local police station.

The Local Government (Scotland) Act 1889 established a uniform system of county councils in Scotland. Zetland County Council, which was created in 1890, established its headquarters in the complex which subsequently became known as the County Buildings. A United States Congressional delegation visited County Buildings to inquire into the impact of North Sea oil on local development in July 1974. The complex reverted to being used largely for judicial purposes, accommodating the offices of the procurator fiscal, as well as Lerwick Sheriff Court and the local police station, after Zetland County Council was abolished in 1975.

The building featured extensively in the television series Shetland, which was first broadcast in March 2013, as the place of work of the main character, Detective Inspector Jimmy Pérez.

The local registrar's office moved from County Buildings to Lerwick Town Hall in February 2015. The building continues to serve as the venue for sheriff court hearings in the area, although, due to staffing issues with the escort services, hearings involving juries were moved to the mainland in July 2023.

== See also ==
- List of listed buildings in Lerwick
