= Tolbooth =

Type of government building in Scotland

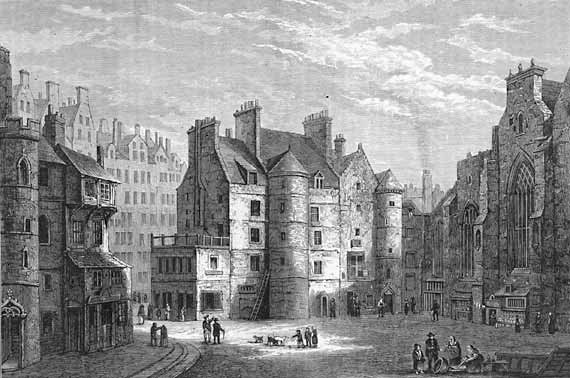
An etching showing the Old Tolbooth, Edinburgh before it was demolished in 1817.

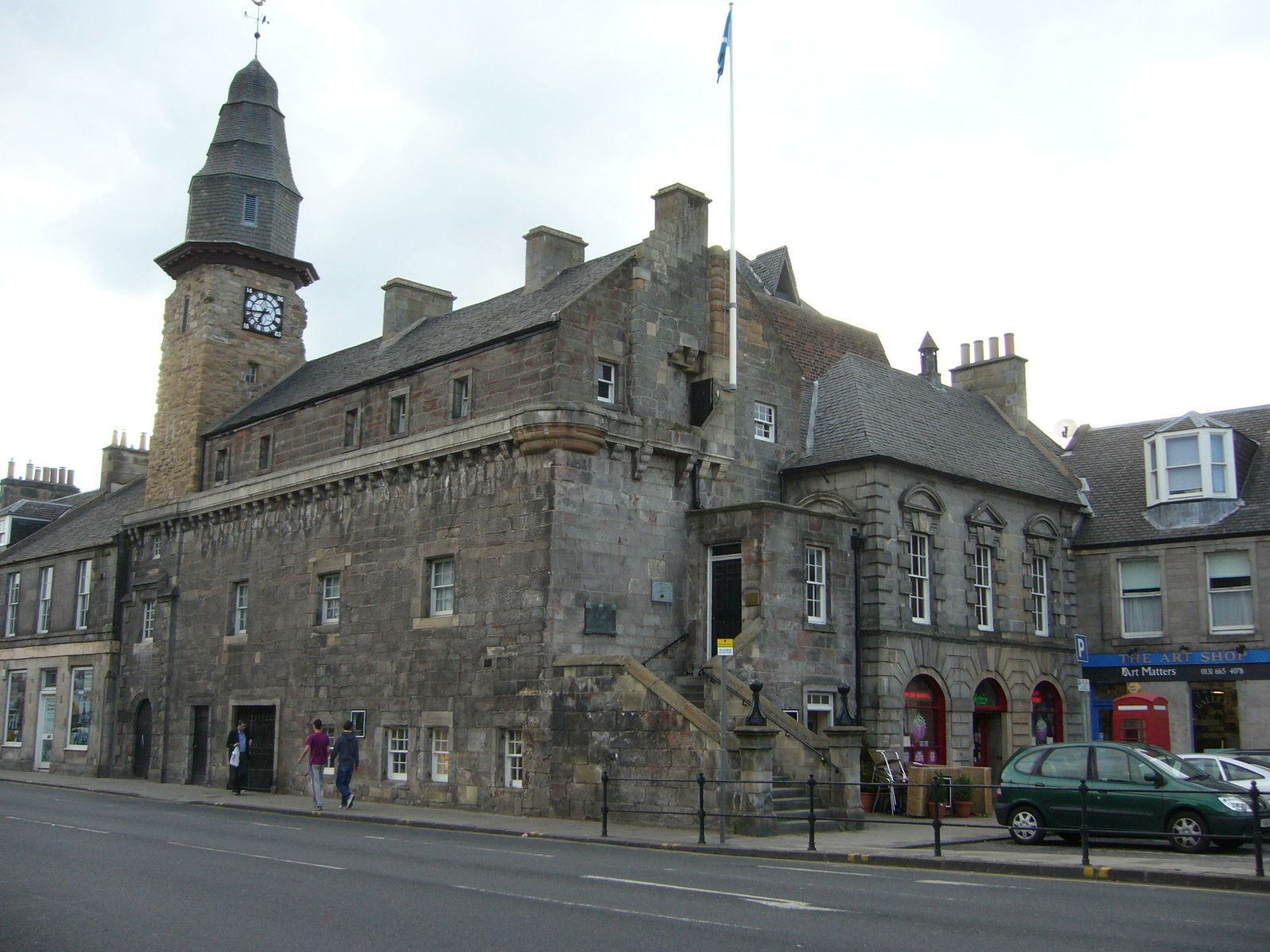
Musselburgh Tolbooth in East Lothian

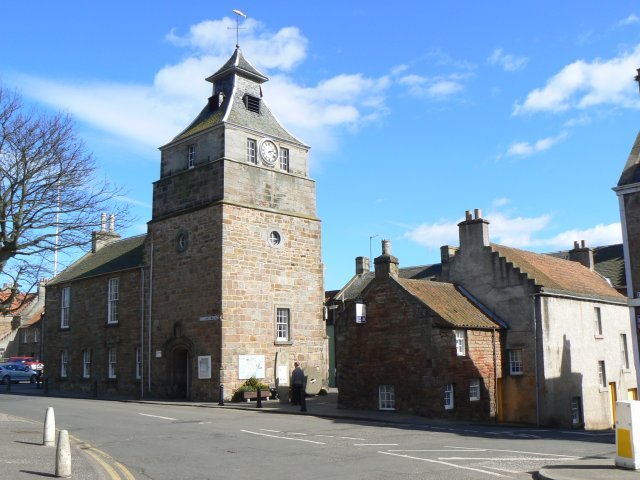
Crail Tolbooth in Fife

A tolbooth or town house was the main municipal building of a Scottish burgh, from medieval times until the 19th century. The tolbooth usually provided a council meeting chamber, a court house and a jail. The tolbooth was one of three essential features in a Scottish burgh, along with the mercat cross and the kirk (church).

== Etymology ==
The word tolbooth is derived from the Middle English word tolbothe that described a town hall containing customs offices and prison cells.

== History ==
Burghs were created in Scotland from the 12th century. They had the right to hold markets and levy customs and tolls, and tolbooths were originally established for collection of these. Royal burghs were governed by an elected council, led by a provost and baillies, who also acted as magistrates with jurisdiction over local crime. The tolbooth developed into a central building providing for all these functions. Most tolbooths had a bell, often mounted on a steeple, and later clocks were added. As well as housing accused criminals awaiting trial, and debtors, tolbooths were also places of public punishment, equipped with a whipping post, stocks or jougs. The tolbooth was occasionally a place of execution, and where victim's heads were displayed. The tolbooth may also have served as the guardhouse of the town guard. Other functions provided in various tolbooths included schoolrooms, weighhouses, storage of equipment and records, and entertainments.

The first record of a tolbooth is at Berwick upon Tweed in the later 13th century, and the earliest known grant of land for construction of a tolbooth is at Dundee in 1325, with many more grants recorded through the 14th century. The oldest tolbooths which survive intact are those of Musselburgh (1590) and Canongate (1591). The tolbooth of Glasgow (1634) has been described as Scotland's "most remarkable civic building of the 17th century". Other Renaissance-style tolbooths were erected at Linlithgow (1668) and Kirkcaldy (1678). By the 18th century, the term "tolbooth" had become closely associated with prison, and the term "town house" became more common to denote the municipal buildings. Classical architectural styles were introduced, as at Dundee (1731) and Sanquhar (1739). In the early 19th century, increasing separation of functions led to purpose-built courthouses and prisons, and the replacement of tolbooths and town houses with modern town halls, serving as council chamber and events venue. The prison functions of tolbooths were overseen by prison boards from 1839, but the jail cell in the Falkirk Steeple remained in use until 1984.

== Present ==
There are around 90 tolbooths surviving in Scotland. Many are still used as municipal buildings, while others have been renovated as museums, theatres, or other attractions.

Some notable tolbooths include:

- Aberdeen Tolbooth, built in 1629
- Canongate Tolbooth, built in 1591
- Clackmannan Tolbooth, built in 1592
- Crail Tolbooth, re-modelled in 1776
- Dalkeith Tolbooth, built in 1648
- Dysart Tolbooth, built in 1576
- Edinburgh Tolbooth, a medieval building on the Royal Mile, built around 1400, demolished in the 19th century
- Falkirk Tolbooth, built in 1814
- Forres Tolbooth, built in 1839
- Girvan Tolbooth, built in 1787, of which the steeple is the only remaining part
- Glasgow Tolbooth, built in 1634, of which the steeple is the only remaining part
- Inverkeithing Tolbooth, built in 1770
- Inverness Tolbooth, built in 1791
- Kilmaurs Tolbooth, built 1709
- Kirkcudbright Tolbooth, built in 1629, now used as an art gallery and visitor centre
- Lanark Tolbooth, built in 1778
- Lerwick Tolbooth, built in 1770
- Musselburgh Tolbooth, built in 1590
- New Galloway Tolbooth, rebuilt in 1875 but dating back at least to 1711
- Pittenweem Tolbooth, built in 1588
- Sanquhar Tolbooth, built in 1739
- South Queensferry Tolbooth, remodelled in 1720
- Stirling Tolbooth, built in 1705
- Stonehaven Tolbooth, built in the late 16th-century
- Tain Tolbooth, built in 1708
- West Wemyss Tolbooth, built circa 1700

== See also ==
- Kirkbymoorside Memorial Hall, formerly the "Toll Booth"
- Skipton Tolbooth, in England
- Tholsel, term for buildings with a similar function in Ireland
- Tron, a weighing device situated near tolbooths for defining taxation on goods.
- Wikt:Tolsey, a term for a similar English building

== Sources ==
- Royal Commission on the Ancient and Historical Monuments of Scotland (1996). Tolbooths and Townhouses: Civic Architecture in Scotland to 1833. Edinburgh: Royal Commission on the Ancient and Historical Monuments of Scotland. ISBN 0114957991.
- Mair, Craig (1988). Mercat Cross and Tolbooth: Understanding Scotland's Old Burghs. Edinburgh: John Donald. ISBN 0-85976-196-7.
- "Burgh tolbooths and early prisons". Scottish Archive Network Knowledge Base. Scottish Archive Network.
