= Lerwick Town Hall =

Municipal building in Lerwick, Scotland

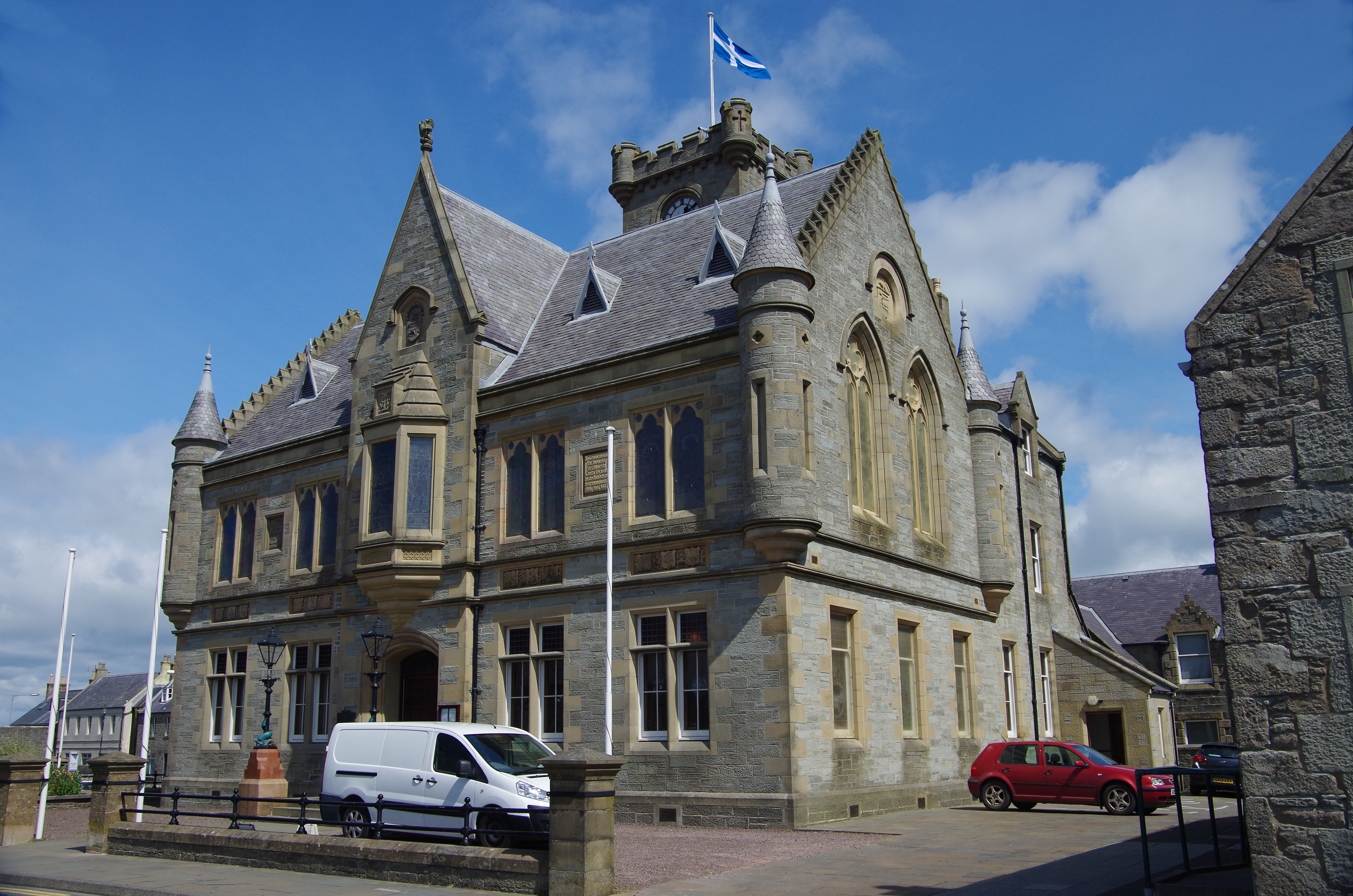
- Lerwick Town Hall

- Shown in Shetland
- 60°9′16″N 1°8′46″W
- Location: Lerwick

History
- Built: 1883

Site notes
- Architect: Alexander Ross
- Architectural style: Scottish Baronial style

Listed Building – Category A
- Designated: 8 November 1974
- Reference no.: LB37256

Lerwick Town Hall is a municipal building located on Hillhead in Lerwick, Shetland, Scotland. It is used as an events venue and registrar's office. The building, which was also the meeting place of Shetland Islands Council until 2022, is a Category A listed building.

== History ==
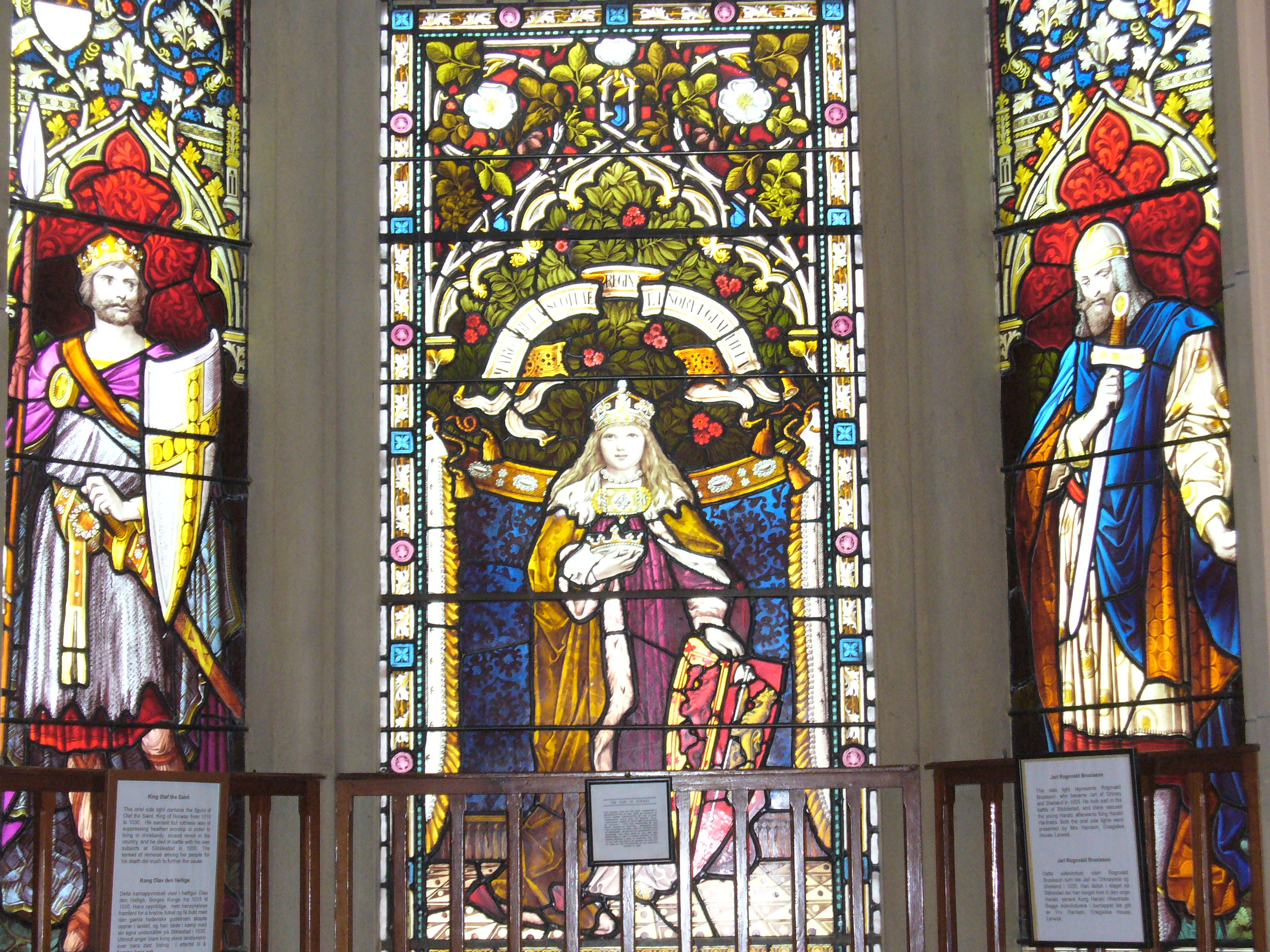
Stained-glass windows inside Lerwick Town Hall

For much of the 19th century meetings of the local council were held in the Parish Kirk in Queens Lane. After a period of rapid population expansion in Lerwick associated with the growth in the herring industry, civic leaders decided to procure a purpose-built town hall: a site on the north Hillhead was selected.

The foundation stone for the new building was laid by Prince Alfred, Duke of Edinburgh on a visit to the isles on 24 January 1882. That same evening Lerwick saw the first ever Up Helly Aa torchlight procession. The new building was designed by architect, Alexander Ross from Inverness, in the Scottish Baronial style and builder John M. Aitken of Lerwick won the tender competition with a price of £3,240. The building was officially opened by George Thoms, Sheriff of Caithness, Orkney and Shetland, on 30 July 1883. The design involved a symmetrical frontage with five bays facing on Hillhead; the central section featured an arched doorway on the ground floor; there was an oriel window on the first floor with a pediment bearing a coat of arms above and there were bartizans at the corners of the building. There was a battlemented tower on the east side and a rose window on the north side. Internally, the principal rooms were a council chamber and a courtroom; there were also police cells in the building.

Stained glass windows, designed by James Ballantine & Son, were subsequently installed in the building: these included a depiction of the marriage between Margaret of Denmark and James III of Scotland in 1469. There were also windows presented by the Corporation of Amsterdam and the Corporation of Hamburg. Panels with the coats of arms of Aberdeen, Edinburgh, Glasgow and Leith, which had been presented by the respective corporations, were installed in a corridor. A clock, designed and manufactured by Potts of Leeds, was installed in the tower in 1887.

The town hall was the headquarters of Lerwick Town Council until 1975, when it passed to the Shetland Islands Council on local government reorganisation. The council moved its main offices to a modern building at 8 North Ness in 2012. The local registrar's office moved from the County Buildings to Lerwick Town Hall in February 2015. The town hall continued to be used for council meetings until 2022 when a new council chamber was created in the former St Ringan's Church on Lower Hillhead.

The front steps of the town hall, which had badly decayed, were replaced in spring 2008. Prince Charles, Duke of Rothesay visited the town hall and reviewed the conservation work being undertaken in July 2021.

Works of art in the town hall include a portrait of Queen Elizabeth II by Leonard Boden and a portrait of Charles Rampini, Sheriff of Dumfries and Galloway, by John Henry Lorimer.

== Services ==
The town hall is used for functions such as marriages, wedding receptions, concerts, coffee mornings and evening events.

== See also ==
- List of Category A listed buildings in Shetland
- List of listed buildings in Lerwick
