= George Hunter MacThomas Thoms =

Scottish advocate, sheriff, and clan chief

George Hunter MacThomas Thoms of Aberlemno FSA Scot FRSE (1831–1903) was a 19th-century Scottish advocate and Sheriff and the 16th clan chief of Clan MacThomas. A wealthy and eccentric bachelor he was a generous benefactor to the Church of Scotland.

== Life ==
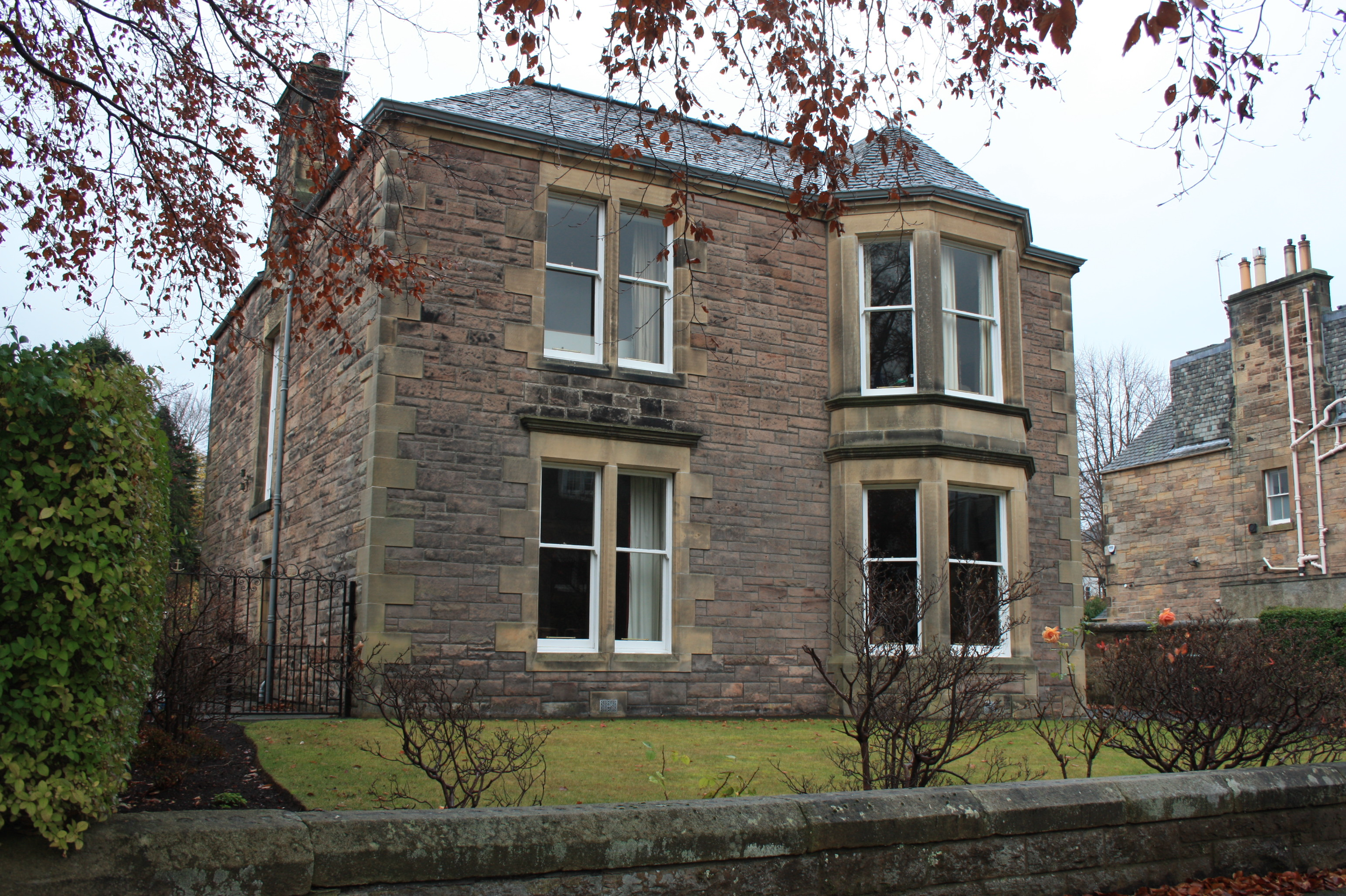
26 Cluny Drive, Edinburgh

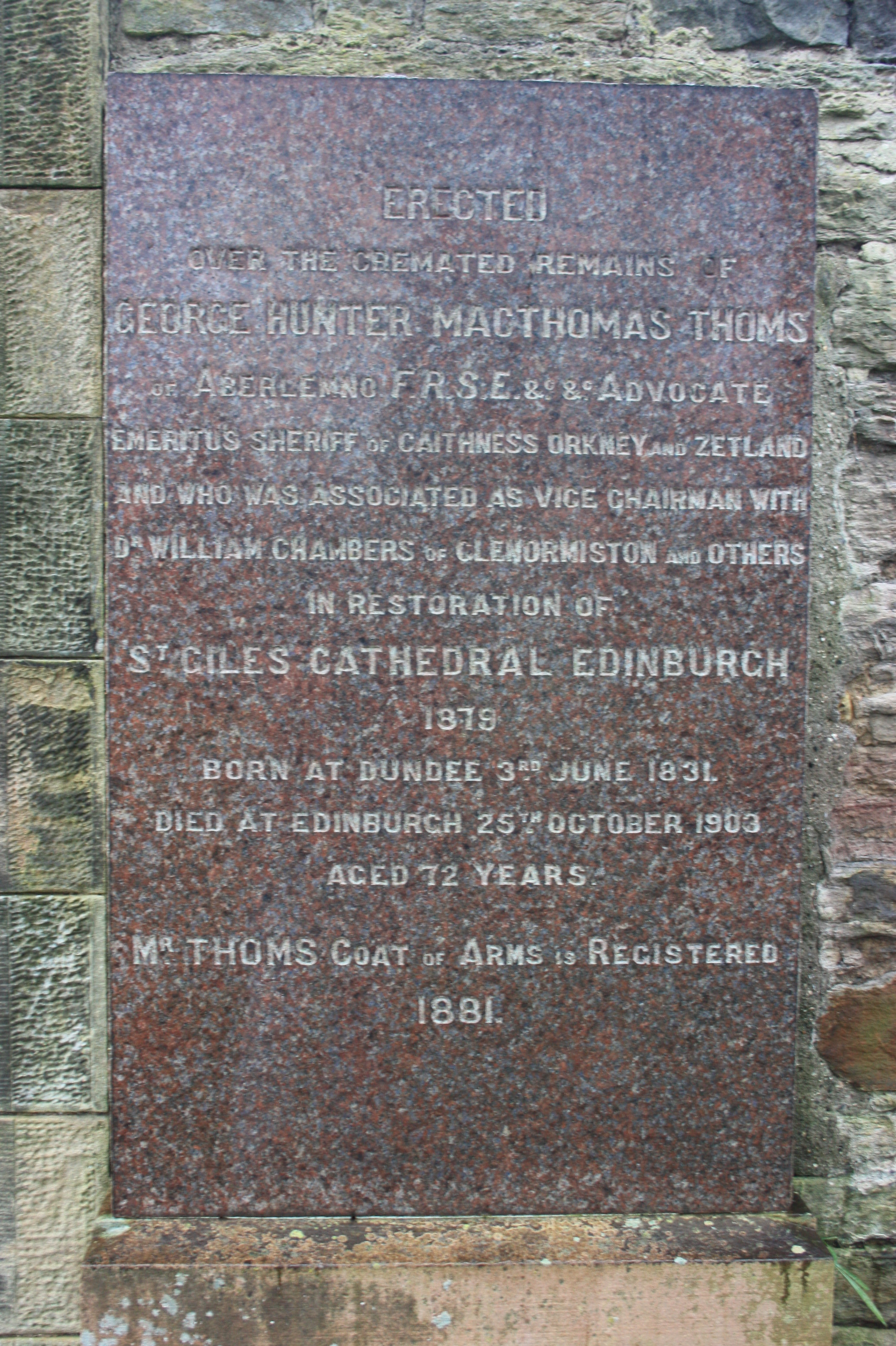
The grave of George Hunter MacThomas Thoms, Morningside Cemetery

He was born at Dundee on 3 June 1831 the son of Grace Watt and her husband, Patrick Hunter Thoms, Merchant and later Provost of Dundee. He was educated at the High School of Dundee then studied law at the University of Edinburgh.

He qualified as an advocate then lived and practised from 13 Albany Street in Edinburgh's New Town. In 1862 he was promoted to Advocate Depute allowing him to move to a large house at 52 Great King Street. In 1885 he moved to 13 Charlotte Square.

From 1870 to 1899 he served as Sheriff of Caithness, Orkney and Shetland, and Vice-Admiral of Orkney and Shetland.

In his role as clan chief he oversaw the choice of tartan for the Clan MacThomas, now known as Ancient MacThomas.

In the 1870s he was Vice-Chairman under William Chambers of the Committee of Subscribers to the restoration of St Giles Cathedral in Edinburgh, and himself paid for the Ladies' Vestry (now the souvenir shop) to be added to the building.

In 1884 he was elected a Fellow of the Royal Society of Edinburgh. His proposers were Thomas Stevenson, Alexander Forbes Irvine, Peter Guthrie Tait and Alexander Buchan.

He was a member of the Royal Company of Archers and the Royal Scottish Geographical Society, and held the Masonic office of Provincial Grand Master of Caithness, Orkney and Zetland.

After he retired he moved to 26 Cluny Drive in the Morningside district of south-west Edinburgh.

Following years of debilitating illness, he died on 25 October 1903 unmarried and childless. He left the residue of his estate, the then sizeable sum of around £60,000 to Kirkwall Town Council in Orkney for the restoration of St Magnus Cathedral (the equivalent of £7 million in 2000). The restoration included installation of a large stained glass window (the main east window) dedicated to his memory and now known as the "Thoms Window".

Thoms' ashes are buried in Morningside Cemetery, Edinburgh. The grave lies on the outer south-west wall and records his benefaction to St Giles.

== Eccentricities ==
Thoms was well known for his many eccentricities, which included wearing rubber-sided waistcoats for laughing and flirtation, serving champagne and laxative cocktails to the Commissioners for Northern Lighthouses, fining his pet cat, and carrying around gutta percha to repair the broken hearts of ladies and a schoolteacher's tawse or strap to "punish" any children he met. He was lampooned by legal colleagues in caricatures and comic poems. On a prominent internal wall of his house at 13 Charlotte Square he had the painted text: "Him Serve with Mirth".

== Controversy as Sheriff ==
Thoms' forthright public criticism of the lawyers who appeared before him caused friction, particularly in Caithness and Shetland. In one judgement he stated: "Procrastination is in Wick the soul of business", and in 1888 Caithness solicitors petitioned unsuccessfully for Thoms' office to be abolished. Following the 1885 General Election he was widely criticised for imprisoning youths involved in an election disturbance in Kirkwall, and was thought to be behind the controversial decision to prosecute and imprison the Rev. Matthew Armour, Free Church Minister of Sanday in Orkney, for breach of the peace at a Conservative election meeting.

== Attempt to overturn his Will ==
After his death, Thoms' two nephews and three nieces raised proceedings in the Court of Session to overturn his will on the grounds of insanity. They relied on his eccentricities, alleged insane delusions, his poor health and alleged manipulation by his valet, Adam Melrose. The case, which came to trial before the Lord Justice-Clerk, Sir John H. A. Macdonald, and a civil jury for five days in February 1905, caused a sensation and was widely reported in the press. The relatives' claim was rejected by the jury, and the bequest to Kirkwall stood.

== Memorials and Artistic depiction ==
In addition to the posthumous window in St Magnus Cathedral, in his lifetime Thoms donated stained glass windows to the Town Halls of Kirkwall and Lerwick and St Mary's Parish Church, Dundee. The souvenir shop of St Giles Cathedral has his coat of arms set into an internal wall in painted and gilt plaster. Thoms Street in Kirkwall is named after him. His portrait in naval uniform is held by the Orkney Museum.

== Publications ==
- Treatise on Judicial Factors, Curators Bonis and Managers of Burghs (1859)

== Further reading ==
MacThomas of Finegand, Andrew (2009), The History of the Clan MacThomas;

McCombie Smith, William (1890), Memoir of the Families of McCombie and Thoms (Second Edition), Edinburgh, William Blackwood;

Sutherland, Paul J. (2013), Mirth, Madness & St Magnus, and the eccentric Sheriff Thoms, Kirkwall, The Orcadian (ISBN 978-1-902957-59-3).
