= Lerwick Lifeboat Station =

RNLI Lifeboat station in Shetland, Scotland

- The Old Tolbooth, home to Lerwick Lifeboat Station

- Location within Shetland

General information
- Type: RNLI Lifeboat Station
- Location: The Old Tolbooth, Commercial Street, Lerwick, Shetland, Scotland, ZE1 0AB,, UK
- Coordinates: 60°09′11.4″N 1°08′25.8″W
- Opened: 1930
- Owner: Royal National Lifeboat Institution

Website
- Lerwick RNLI Lifeboat Station

Lerwick Lifeboat Station is located in Lerwick, the main town and port of the Shetland archipelago, which sits 123 miles (198 km) off the north coast of the mainland of Scotland.

A lifeboat was first stationed at Lerwick in 1930, by the Royal National Lifeboat Institution (RNLI).

Lerwick Severn-class All-weather lifeboat 17-10 Michael and Jane Vernon (ON 1221)

The station currently operates 17-10 Michael and Jane Vernon (ON 1221), a Severn-class All-weather lifeboat, on station since 1997, and only the fourth lifeboat to have served at Lerwick.

== History ==
At a meeting of the RNLI committee of management on Thursday 20 March 1930, it was decided to establish a lifeboat station at Lerwick, following improvements in communication systems by the Board of Trade. A lifeboat of the most powerful type, a 51-foot Barnett-class lifeboat, was ordered due to the location. Twin 60-hp engines would provide a maximum speed of 8.75 knots (16.21 km/h; 10.07 mph), and a range of 176 miles (283 km) at her cruising speed of 7.5 knots (13.9 km/h; 8.6 mph), and was due to be supplied in July 1930.

As if to prove the need for a lifeboat, only eight days later, on 28 March 1930, the fishing trawler Ben Doran was wrecked off Shetland, with the loss of all nine crew. The nearest lifeboat at the time was at Stromness, which made a journey of 55 hours and 360 miles (580 km), but to no avail.

Lerwick lifeboat station became operational on 17 July 1930, on the arrival of the 51-foot Barnett-class lifeboat built by J. Samuel White, which had departed Cowes some eight days earlier.

The two first services of the lifeboat would come on two consecutive days. On 21 February 1931, the steamer Everline of Riga was 100 miles west of Shetland, and drifting towards the islands, after losing her propeller. Two Lerwick trawlers set out to tow her to safety. The lifeboat crew were awaiting further news of the steamer, when they were called to the ketch Nolsoy of Tórshavn, towing her into harbour at 18:05. On hearing that the towline to the Everline had parted, the lifeboat, taking extra fuel, set out again at 19:15, spending overnight at Symbister due to the conditions, and then heading out to the Everline at 06:00 on the 22 February, arriving at 09:30. In worsening conditions, at 12:30, the Master decided to abandon ship, and in difficult conditions, all 26 men were rescued by the lifeboat.

The Lerwick lifeboat was one of two boats, funded from the legacy of the late Mr William Ryland of Ryland's Electro-plating Company, Sheffield. The second lifeboat was placed at Weymouth, and named William and Clara Ryland (ON 735). At a ceremony on 25 June 1932, attended by over 3,000 people, the Lerwick lifeboat was named Lady Jane and Martha Ryland (ON 731) by The Duchess of Montrose.

On 16 October 1958, the Soviet trawler Urbe, with a crew of 25, sank near Holm of Skaw. The lifeboat Claude Cecil Staniforth (ON 943), which had been on station at Lerwick for just over two months, was launched on a 50 mi (80 km) journey in storm conditions. Putting into Baltasound, they collected local pilot Andrew Mouat, who had offered his services. After much difficulty, including use of a local 10-foot boat, and getting one propeller fouled, the lifeboat rescued the only three survivors. Coxswain John Sales was awarded the RNLI Silver Medal, Mr Mouat being awarded the RNLI Bronze Medal.

A 52-foot Arun-class lifeboat 52-10 Soldian (ON 1057) was placed at Lerwick in 1978. In 19 years service, this boat was launched 245 times, and rescue 260 lives. The boat would see some of the most dramatic rescue services, and RNLI Gallantry Medals were awarded on no fewer than five occasions, a silver and four bronze. Four of the awards were made to Coxswain Hewitt Clark, who was awarded a bronze medal, and two bars (three services), and then a silver medal in 1995. In 2002, Soldian was sold to the Icelandic SAR lifeboat service, and served for a further 19 years as Ásgrímur St. Björnsson (2541).

Clark would be further awarded with the RNLI Gold Medal, for the service to the Green Lily on 19 November 1997, with the new Lerwick Severn-class lifeboat 17-10 Michael and Jane Vernon (ON 1221), which had replaced Soldian on 19 July 1997, and had been on service for just four months.

In 2005, a new shore facility was opened at the Old Tolbooth.

=== Green Lily ===
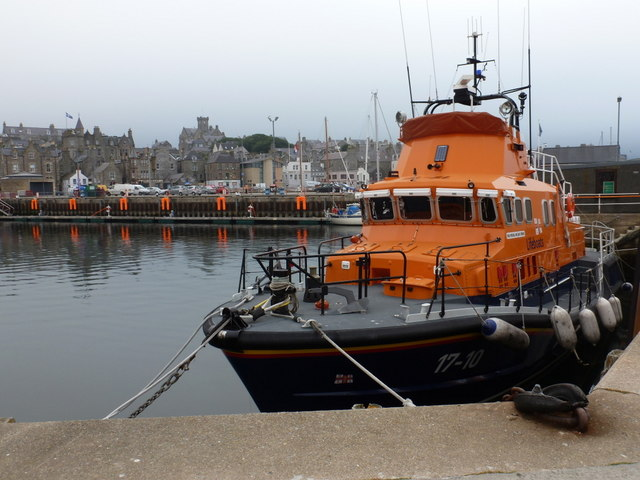
Lerwick Lifeboat 17-10 Michael and Jane Vernon

In storm force 11 conditions, which had battered the Shetland Islands for days, cancelling all ferry services, the 3,624 ton refrigerated cargo vessel Green Lily, with 15 crew, departed Lerwick in the early hours on 19 November 1997, loaded with frozen fish, and bound for West Africa.

15 miles (24 km) miles out, she developed engine trouble. Two tugs were dispatched, but when the towline broke, the Lerwick lifeboat Michael and Jane Vernon was called, along with Rescue Helicopter Rescue Lima Charlie from Sumburgh in Shetland.

The lifeboat arrived to find the vessel just over 1 mile (1.6 km) off shore, with the helicopter unable to assist due to the rolling of the ship. With great skill and expertise, the lifeboat was brought alongside many times, but the crew didn't seem to appreciate the danger they were in. Often, nobody was ready to leave. Eventually, five crewmen were taken off, not assisted by them bring luggage.

Various efforts with tow lines failed, but a tug managed to grapple the anchor chain, and pulled the boat around. The lifeboat then couldn't get close, but the helicopter could now help. Winchman William (Bill) Deacon was lowered to the boat, and he set about sending up the remaining 10 crewmen, two at a time.

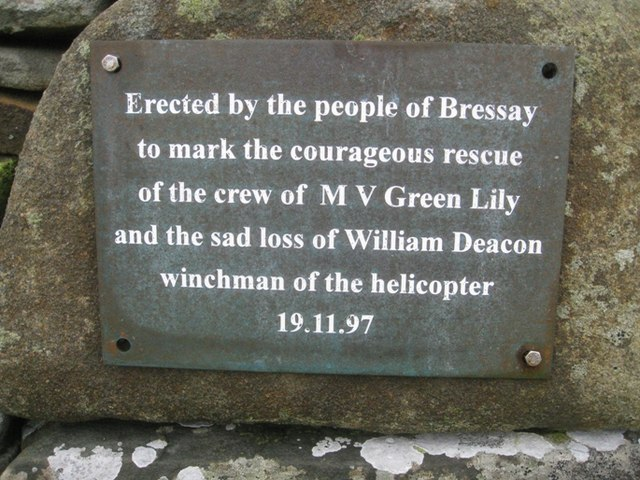
Memorial Inscription cairn at Grutwick

As the last two men left the boat, leaving him alone, he was washed off the ship by a large wave. Lowering the winch cable a final time, it got snagged on the wreck. The Pilot had to make the decision to cut the cable, rather than risk the helicopter and all aboard, knowing that they then had no method to try to retrieve the Winchman. With no way of getting close, the lifeboat headed to port, dropped off their five survivors, and headed straight back out to try to find Mr Deacon, but with no success. William Deacon's body was later recovered. He was posthumously awarded the George Medal for his bravery that day. All the lifeboat crew were awarded RNLI Medals.

At the fatal accident inquiry at Lerwick Sheriff Court in August 1999, Sheriff Colin Scott Mackenzie concluded that "unnecessary and cumulative delays by the captain and 14 crew of the Bahamian-registered ship were largely to blame for Mr Deacon's death".

Today, the Billy Deacon SAR Memorial Trophy, sponsored by Bristow Helicopters and Breitling UK, is awarded to winch paramedics and/or winch operators from contracted (Maritime and Coastguard Agency) helicopter bases operating in the UK and Irish SAR regions, for meritorious service during SAR helicopter operations.

== Station honours ==
The following are awards made at Lerwick:

- George Medal
  William (Bill) Deacon, Winchman – 2000 (post.)
- RNLI Gold Medal
  Peter Hewitt Peterson Clark, Coxswain/Mechanic – 1998
- The Maud Smith Award 1997
  (for the bravest act of lifesaving during the year by a member of a lifeboat crew)
  Peter Hewitt Peterson Clark, Coxswain/Mechanic – 1998
- RNLI Silver Medal
  Miss Grace Tate – 1856
  Miss Ellen Petrie – 1856
  James Jamieson, Capt. fishing vessel Wild Wave – 1896
  John Wood Sales, Coxswain – 1958
  George Leith, Coxswain – 1973
  Peter Hewitt Peterson Clark, Coxswain/Mechanic – 1995
- James Michael Bower Endowment Fund,
  Awarded to recipients of either the Gold or Silver Medal of the Royal National Lifeboat Institution.
  John Wood Sales, Coxswain – 1959
- RNLI Bronze Medal
  John Wood Sales, Coxswain – 1957
  Andrew Duncan Mouat, Pilot of Baltasound – 1958
  Peter Hewitt Peterson Clark, Coxswain/Mechanic – 1983
  Peter Hewitt Peterson Clark, Coxswain/Mechanic – 1989 (Second-Service Clasp)
  George Lamont Williamson, skipper/owner of the salmon work boat Challenge – 1991
  Peter Hewitt Peterson Clark, Coxswain/Mechanic – 1993 (Third-Service Clasp)
  William John Clark, Joint Second Coxswain – 1994
  Richie Simpson, Second Coxswain – 1998
  Peter Thomson, Emergency Mechanic – 1998
  Brian Laurenson, Emergency Mechanic – 1998
  Ian Leask, crew member – 1998
  Michael Grant, crew member – 1998
- The Maud Smith Award 1993
  (for the bravest act of lifesaving during the year by a member of a lifeboat crew)
  William John Clark, Joint Second Coxswain – 1994
- A special RNLI Vellum
  William (Bill) Deacon, Winchman – 1998 (post.)
- 'Collective Thanks of the Institution inscribed on Vellum'
  awarded to the crew of the coastguard helicopter Rescue Lima Charlie
  Norman Leask, Captain – 1998
  David Gribben, Co-Pilot – 1998
  Paul Mansell, Winch operator – 1998
  William (Bill) Deacon, Winchman – 1998 (post.)
- 'The Thanks of the Institution inscribed on Vellum'
  Lerwick Lifeboat Crew – 1973
  George Leith, Coxswain – 1974
  Andrew Leask, Assistant Mechanic – 1983
  Ian Newlands, Emergency Mechanic – 1983
  Robert Wiseman, crew member – 1989
  Iain Tulloch, crew member – 1989
  Peter Hewitt Peterson Clark, Coxswain/Mechanic – 1990
  Peter Hewitt Peterson Clark, Coxswain/Mechanic – 1993
  William J Clark, Joint Second Coxswain – 1994
  Peter Thomson, Joint Second Coxswain/Assistant Mechanic – 1994
  Ian Fraser, Emergency Mechanic – 1994
  Robert Wiseman, crew member – 1994
  Richard Simpson, crew member – 1994
  Theo Nicolson, crew member – 1994
  Peter Thomson, Joint Second Coxswain/Assistant Mechanic – 1995
  Ian Fraser, crew member – 1995
  Iain Tulloch, crew member – 1995
  Robert Wiseman, crew member – 1995
  Richard Simpson, crew member – 1995
  Peter Hewitt Peterson Clark, Coxswain/Mechanic – 1995
- 'A Framed Letter of Thanks signed by the Chairman of the Institution'
  John Wood Sales, BEM, Coxswain – 1969
  Each of the seven members of the Lerwick lifeboat crew – 1969
  James Christie – 1991
  Theodore Fullerton – 1991
  John William Ward – 1991
  (all members of the Challenge crew).
  Peter Thomson, Joint Second Coxswain/Assistant Mechanic – 1995
  Ian Fraser, crew member – 1995
  Iain Tulloch, crew member – 1995
  Richard Simpson, crew member – 1995
  J Sinclair, crew member – 1995
- 'A Collective Letter of Thanks signed by the Chairman of the Institution'
  Lerwick Lifeboat Coxswain and Crew – 1954
  Peter Hewitt Peterson Clark, Coxswain/Mechanic – 1992
  Ian Fraser, Emergency Mechanic – 1992
  Iain Tulloch, crew member – 1992
  Robert Wiseman, crew member – 1992
  Richard Simpson, crew member – 1992
  Malcolm Craigie, crew member – 1992
- Silver enamelled RAF crest, presented by No 18 Group RAF
  Lerwick lifeboat station – 1948 (It was fitted in lifeboat ON 731).
- Service Award Plaque, awarded by The Swedish Lifeboat Society
  Lerwick Lifeboat Station – 1957
- Inscribed Binocular Glass
  G. T. Kay, Honorary Secretary – 1930
- British Empire Medal
  John Wood Sales, Coxswain – 1968QBH
- Member, Order of the British Empire (MBE)
  Peter Hewitt Peterson Clark, Coxswain/Mechanic – 1999QBH

== Lerwick lifeboats ==
=== All-weather lifeboats ===
ON (Note: ON is the RNLI's Official Number of the boat.)	Op.No. (Note: Op.No. is the RNLI's Operational Number of the boat carried on the hull.)	Name	Built	On station	Class	Comments
731	−	Lady Jane and Martha Ryland	1930	1930−1958	51-foot Barnett	
943	−	Claude Cecil Staniforth	1958	1958−1978	52-foot Barnett (Mk.II)	Transferred to Arranmore.
1057	52-10	Soldian	1978	1978−1997	52-foot Arun	Transferred to Achill Island.
1221	17-10	Michael and Jane Vernon	1997	1997−	Severn	

More post-service details can be found on the respective lifeboat class pages.

== See also ==
- List of RNLI stations
- List of former RNLI stations
- Royal National Lifeboat Institution lifeboats
