= West Wemyss =

Village in Fife, Scotland

Coordinates: 56°08′N 3°05′W

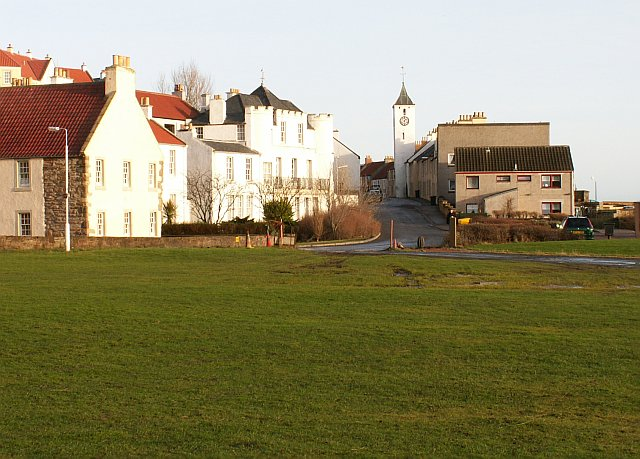
West Wemyss

West Wemyss (/wɛst wiːmz/ Scottish Gaelic: Uaimheis an Iar) is a village lying on the north shore of the Firth of Forth, in Fife, Scotland. According to the 2007 population estimate, the village has a population of 237. The village was granted burgh of barony status in 1525, bearing the name from the Wemyss family who lived in Wemyss Castle.

== History ==
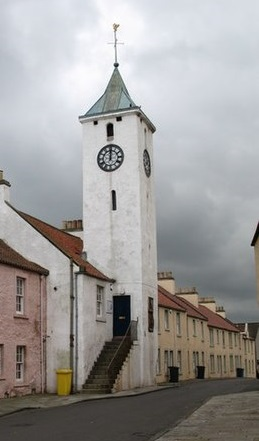
West Wemyss Tolbooth

The village of West Wemyss began as a settlement around the site of Wemyss Castle which developed into a centre for the salt industry in the area. In July 1501, the Wemyss family disputed ownership and costs of a share of the coal and saltpans with the Livingstones of Drumry. The rights to a share had been granted by David Wemyss of Muthill in November 1428.

An epidemic of plague arrived in Scotland in July 1584, brought to West Wemyss in a ship called a crayer.

A harbour was later built in 1621 by the Wemyss family for the use of coal exportation from the pits on the lands of their estate. The harbour would become a major export point for coal by the late 17th century. The ships brought back imports of wood, iron and flax from the Baltic Countries. A wet dock was added for the increased demand of the coal in the 1870s. Towards the latter stages of the 19th century, the village found itself surrounded by several mines - such as the Michael Pit in nearby East Wemyss. The industry, which saw trade with England and The Low Countries, started to struggle once the new docks were opened in Methil further along the Fife coast. Gradually, the demand for the harbour began to fall and it went into decline. The harbour has since been filled in and part of the old village restored, becoming a conservation area with several attractive buildings.

West Wemyss Tolbooth was completed in the early 18th century.

The manse in the village was rebuilt in 1894 to a design by Robert Lorimer.

== Present day ==
The West Wemyss development trust have been pivotal in the re-creation of village services. A 2009 report identified various options for the Wemyss Arms, a disused pub. In 2012 the building has been re-opened as a bistro, cafe, shop and bunkhouse, providing much needed local facilities.

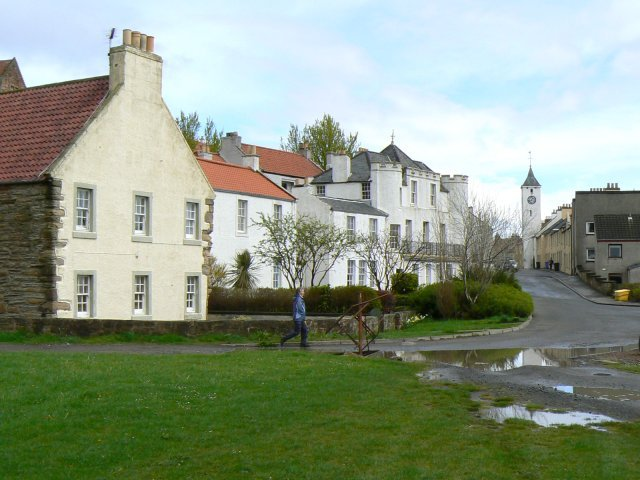
West Wemyss
