= List of listed buildings in Musselburgh, East Lothian =

This is a list of listed buildings in the parish of Musselburgh in East Lothian, Scotland.

== List ==
Name	Location	Date Listed	Grid Ref. (Note: Sometimes known as OSGB36, the grid reference (where provided) is based on the British national grid reference system used by the Ordnance Survey. • "Guide to National Grid". Ordnance Survey. • "Get-a-map". Ordnance Survey.)	Geo-coordinates	Notes	LB Number (Note: Historic Environment Scotland assign a unique alphanumeric identifier to each designated site in Scotland, for listed buildings this always begins with "LB", for example "LB12345".)	Image
110 And 112 North High Street				55°56′37″N 3°03′36″W	Category C(S)	38374	Upload Photo
Station Road Links Coachworks				55°56′23″N 3°03′31″W	Category B	38385	Upload Photo
1-53 West Holmes Gardens, Odd Numbers				55°56′28″N 3°03′34″W	Category B	38390	Upload Photo
57-67 Odd Numbers And 68-104 Even Numbers West Holmes Gardens				55°56′30″N 3°03′35″W	Category C(S)	38391	Upload Photo
2-14 West Holmes Gardens, Even Numbers				55°56′28″N 3°03′33″W	Category B	38392	Upload Photo
22 And 24 West Holmes Gardens				55°56′29″N 3°03′34″W	Category B	38394	Upload Photo
26-64 West Holmes Gardens Even Numbers				55°56′30″N 3°03′36″W	Category B	38395	Upload Photo
1-8 Windsor Gardens, Consecutive Numbers				55°56′42″N 3°02′06″W	Category B	38397	Upload Photo
24 Hercus Loan				55°56′32″N 3°03′30″W	Category C(S)	38290	Upload Photo
31 And 33 High Street				55°56′37″N 3°02′51″W	Category B	38299	Upload Photo
35, 37 And 39 High Street				55°56′37″N 3°02′52″W	Category C(S)	38300	Upload Photo
58 And 60 High Street Rumours Corner Of Newbigging				55°56′34″N 3°02′53″W	Category C(S)	38323	Upload Photo
Linkfield Road Corner Of Millhill Loretto School Loretto Villa				55°56′43″N 3°02′38″W	Category B	38334	Upload Photo
Linkfield Road Loretto School Mound				55°56′41″N 3°02′38″W	Category C(S)	38336	Upload Photo
Linkfield Road, 1-13 Albert Terrace (Consecutive Numbers)				55°56′43″N 3°02′08″W	Category B	38344	Upload Photo
Mall Avenue Moir Statue				55°56′31″N 3°03′16″W	Category B	38346	Upload Photo
North High Street North Esk Lodge Corner Of Eskside West				55°56′40″N 3°03′10″W	Category B	38366	Upload Photo
4 Balcarres Road Formerly Bruntsfield Links Golfing Society				55°56′45″N 3°02′46″W	Category B	38248	Upload Photo
11, 13 And 15 Bridge Street				55°56′34″N 3°03′20″W	Category C(S)	38251	Upload Photo
23 Bridge Street				55°56′35″N 3°03′21″W	Category C(S)	38253	Upload Photo
26 Bridge Street				55°56′37″N 3°03′29″W	Category B	38263	Upload Photo
3 And 5 Campie Lane				55°56′35″N 3°03′42″W	Category C(S)	38265	Upload Photo
32 And 33 Eskside West And 1 Hercus Loan				55°56′31″N 3°03′24″W	Category C(S)	38285	Upload Photo
79-81 North High Street, Volunteer Arms (Staggs)				55°56′39″N 3°03′26″W	Category C(S)	51111	Upload Photo
Windsor Gardens, St Anne's Convent				55°56′45″N 3°02′30″W	Category B	38399	Upload Photo
34 And 36 Ravensheugh Road				55°56′45″N 3°01′27″W	Category B	38381	Upload Photo
Stoneyhill				55°56′20″N 3°03′55″W	Category B	38387	Upload Photo
16-20 West Holmes Gardens, Even Numbers				55°56′30″N 3°03′33″W	Category B	38393	Upload Photo
9-15 Windsor Gardens, Consecutive Numbers				55°56′42″N 3°02′11″W	Category B	38398	Upload Photo
23-29 (Odd Nos) High Street				55°56′37″N 3°02′50″W	Category B	38297	Upload Photo
41 High Street Post Office				55°56′37″N 3°02′52″W	Category B	38301	Upload Photo
65-75 High Street Odd Numbers				55°56′35″N 3°02′57″W	Category C(S)	38310	Upload Photo
129-135 High Street Odd Numbers				55°56′33″N 3°03′05″W	Category C(S)	38312	Upload Photo
High Street Pinkie House Walled Garden				55°56′34″N 3°02′35″W	Category B	38317	Upload Photo
2, 4 High Street				55°56′36″N 3°02′44″W	Category C(S)	38320	Upload Photo
67 Millhill Montague House				55°56′40″N 3°02′57″W	Category B	38349	Upload Photo
54 Millhill				55°56′38″N 3°02′57″W	Category C(S)	38355	Upload Photo
109 Newbigging				55°56′22″N 3°02′53″W	Category B	38360	Upload Photo
43 And 45 Bridge Street				55°56′36″N 3°03′24″W	Category C(S)	38254	Upload Photo
4 And 6 Bridge Street/26 Eskside West				55°56′33″N 3°03′20″W	Category B	38257	Upload Photo
Bridge Street, North Esk Church (C Of S)				55°56′36″N 3°03′27″W	Category B	38260	Upload Photo
2 Bush Terrace Corner Of New Street				55°56′42″N 3°03′49″W	Category C(S)	38264	Upload Photo
20-32 Campie Road Even Numbers And 66 West Holmes Gardens				55°56′32″N 3°03′41″W	Category B	38266	Upload Photo
35 And 37 Dalrymple Loan				55°56′26″N 3°03′10″W	Category C(S)	38271	Upload Photo
8 Eskside West Eskside House Including Garden Wall And Gazebo				55°56′37″N 3°03′12″W	Category B	38276	Upload Photo
29 Eskside West				55°56′32″N 3°03′22″W	Category C(S)	38282	Upload Photo
31 Eskside West				55°56′32″N 3°03′23″W	Category C(S)	38284	Upload Photo
57 And 58 Eskside West				55°56′27″N 3°03′32″W	Category B	38286	Upload Photo
21 North High Street Musselburgh And Fisherrow Co-Operative Society Store				55°56′39″N 3°03′16″W	Category B	38367	Upload Photo
167 North High Street				55°56′39″N 3°03′37″W	Category C(S)	38369	Upload Photo
176 And 178 North High Street				55°56′38″N 3°03′49″W	Category C(S)	38376	Upload Photo
30 And 32 Ravensheugh Road				55°56′44″N 3°01′28″W	Category C(S)	38380	Upload Photo
40 Ravensheugh Road				55°56′45″N 3°01′27″W	Category C(S)	38382	Upload Photo
1 Shorthope Street				55°56′34″N 3°03′03″W	Category C(S)	38383	Upload Photo
1 And 2 Grove Street And 67 Pinkie Road				55°56′26″N 3°02′35″W	Category B	38288	Upload Photo
3 And 4 Grove Street				55°56′25″N 3°02′34″W	Category B	38289	Upload Photo
1 And 3 High Street				55°56′38″N 3°02′46″W	Category B	38292	Upload Photo
13 High Street				55°56′37″N 3°02′47″W	Category B	38295	Upload Photo
123 High Street On Corner Of Shorthope Street				55°56′34″N 3°03′04″W	Category B	38311	Upload Photo
High Street David Wright Drinking Fountain				55°56′32″N 3°03′14″W	Category B	38313	Upload Photo
1, 3A And 3B Dambrae, Corner Of High Street				55°56′34″N 3°02′58″W	Category B	38332	Upload Photo
14 A B C And D Linkfield Road				55°56′43″N 3°02′29″W	Category B	38340	Upload Photo
17 And 18 Linkfield Road				55°56′43″N 3°02′27″W	Category B	38342	Upload Photo
19 Linkfield Road				55°56′43″N 3°02′26″W	Category B	38343	Upload Photo
33-39 Millhill Trafalgar Lodge (Odd Numbers)				55°56′44″N 3°02′52″W	Category B	38348	Upload Photo
71 And 73 Millhill				55°56′39″N 3°02′58″W	Category B	38351	Upload Photo
77 Millhill Millhill House				55°56′39″N 3°02′59″W	Category C(S)	38352	Upload Photo
50 And 52 Millhill				55°56′38″N 3°02′57″W	Category C(S)	38354	Upload Photo
17 And 19 Bridge Street				55°56′35″N 3°03′21″W	Category C(S)	38252	Upload Photo
Bridge Street St Andrew's Church Hall,				55°56′37″N 3°03′24″W	Category C(S)	38256	Upload Photo
22 Bridge Street				55°56′36″N 3°03′28″W	Category B	38262	Upload Photo
14 Eskside West				55°56′35″N 3°03′16″W	Category C(S)	38279	Upload Photo
88 North High Street Corner Of South Street				55°56′38″N 3°03′33″W	Category C(S)	38372	Upload Photo
Old Bridge				55°56′29″N 3°03′25″W	Category A	38378	Upload another image
Ravensheugh Road West Lodge Drummore				55°56′49″N 3°01′15″W	Category C(S)	38379	Upload Photo
Windsor Gardens Gatepiers Facing Linkfield Road				55°56′44″N 3°02′08″W	Category B	38396	Upload Photo
High Street Pinkie Pillars East Port				55°56′37″N 3°02′44″W	Category B	38291	Upload Photo
9 And 11 High Street				55°56′37″N 3°02′47″W	Category C(S)	38294	Upload Photo
23 High Street (At Rear Of Building Fronting High Street) Former Aerated Water/Lemonade Factory				55°56′38″N 3°02′50″W	Category B	38298	Upload Photo
High Street Mercat Cross				55°56′36″N 3°02′53″W	Category B	38307	Upload Photo
High Street, Pinkie House The Mansionhouse And Draw Well				55°56′33″N 3°02′39″W	Category A	38314	Upload another image See more images
70 High Street				55°56′34″N 3°02′54″W	Category C(S)	38324	Upload Photo
128 & 130 High Street The Royal Esk				55°56′32″N 3°03′02″W	Category B	38328	Upload Photo
136 High Street				55°56′33″N 3°03′03″W	Category C(S)	38329	Upload Photo
Inveresk Village Road St Michaels House, Gatepiers, Lodge And Stables				55°56′12″N 3°03′17″W	Category B	38331	Upload Photo
13, 15 And 17 Kilwinning Place				55°56′33″N 3°02′59″W	Category C(S)	38333	Upload Photo
6A Links Street, Congregational Church				55°56′40″N 3°03′25″W	Category C(S)	38345	Upload Photo
2-6 Mountjoy Terrace (Consecutive Numbers)				55°56′50″N 3°03′14″W	Category C(S)	38357	Upload Photo
Royal Bank Of Scotland, Bridge Street				55°56′35″N 3°03′24″W	Category B	38259	Upload Photo
23 Dalrymple Loan, Belleville				55°56′28″N 3°03′12″W	Category C(S)	38267	Upload Photo
5 And 6 Eskside West				55°56′41″N 3°03′06″W	Category C(S)	38275	Upload Photo
12 Eskside West				55°56′36″N 3°03′15″W	Category C(S)	38277	Upload Photo
16 And 17 Eskside West				55°56′35″N 3°03′17″W	Category C(S)	38280	Upload Photo
101 And 103 North High Street Melville House				55°56′39″N 3°03′29″W	Category C(S)	38368	Upload Photo
150 And 152 North High Street				55°56′37″N 3°03′42″W	Category C(S)	38375	Upload Photo
2 Shorthope Street				55°56′34″N 3°03′05″W	Category C(S)	38384	Upload Photo
Stoneyhill House				55°56′22″N 3°04′01″W	Category B	38389	Upload Photo
Fisherrow Harbour				55°56′44″N 3°04′03″W	Category B	38287	Upload another image
61, 61A High Street				55°56′36″N 3°02′55″W	Category C(S)	38306	Upload Photo
86, 88 And 90 High Street Corner Of Kilwinning Street				55°56′34″N 3°02′56″W	Category C(S)	38327	Upload Photo
Linkfield Road Loretto School Doocot				55°56′41″N 3°02′47″W	Category B	38337	Upload Photo
Linkfield Road Loretto School Colin Thomson Hall				55°56′43″N 3°02′48″W	Category B	38338	Upload Photo
9 And 11 Linkfield Road				55°56′44″N 3°02′30″W	Category C(S)	38339	Upload Photo
1 Millhill Linkfield Cottage				55°56′45″N 3°02′35″W	Category B	38347	Upload Photo
96 And 98 Newbigging				55°56′23″N 3°02′54″W	Category C(S)	38361	Upload Photo
10 Balcarres Road Formerly Edinburgh Burgess Golfing Society				55°56′51″N 3°02′49″W	Category B	38249	Upload Photo
25 Dalrymple Loan, Glengyle House With Boundary Walls				55°56′27″N 3°03′11″W	Category C(S)	38268	Upload Photo
31 And 33 Dalrymple Loan				55°56′27″N 3°03′10″W	Category C(S)	38270	Upload Photo
30 Eskside West				55°56′32″N 3°03′23″W	Category C(S)	38283	Upload Photo
253 North High Street Spring Bank				55°56′39″N 3°03′53″W	Category B	38370	Upload Photo
Stoneyhill Former Steading David Lowe & Sons Ltd				55°56′21″N 3°03′56″W	Category B	38388	Upload Photo
49 High Street, Musselburgh Arms Hotel				55°56′36″N 3°02′53″W	Category B	38303	Upload Photo
High Street, Pinkie House Lodge And Gatepiers				55°56′37″N 3°02′42″W	Category B	38315	Upload Photo
High Street Pinkie House Stables				55°56′37″N 3°02′40″W	Category B	38316	Upload Photo
12, 14 And 16 High Street				55°56′35″N 3°02′47″W	Category B	38321	Upload Photo
76-84 High Street (Even Numbers)				55°56′34″N 3°02′55″W	Category C(S)	38326	Upload Photo
High Street High Church (Church Of Scotland)				55°56′31″N 3°03′15″W	Category B	38330	Upload Photo
113, 115 And 117 Millhill				55°56′38″N 3°03′03″W	Category B	38353	Upload Photo
Newfield Loretto School Sports Pavilion				55°56′47″N 3°03′01″W	Category B	38364	Upload Photo
97 New Street Forth Yacht Club				55°56′42″N 3°03′51″W	Category C(S)	38365	Upload Photo
18 And 20 Bridge Street				55°56′36″N 3°03′27″W	Category B	38261	Upload Photo
39 And 41 Dalrymple Loan				55°56′26″N 3°03′10″W	Category C(S)	38272	Upload Photo
1 And 2 Eskside West				55°56′43″N 3°03′04″W	Category C(S)	38273	Upload Photo
3 And 4 Eskside West				55°56′42″N 3°03′05″W	Category C(S)	38274	Upload Photo
10 North High Street M & F Co-Operative Society, Former Butchery Department				55°56′38″N 3°03′18″W	Category B	38371	Upload Photo
47 High Street				55°56′37″N 3°02′53″W	Category B	38302	Upload Photo
55 And 57 High Street				55°56′36″N 3°02′54″W	Category B	38305	Upload Photo
High Street Town House				55°56′35″N 3°02′56″W	Category A	38308	Upload Photo
High Street Pinkie House Doocot				55°56′40″N 3°02′27″W	Category B	38318	Upload Photo
72 And 74 High Street The Inn Place				55°56′34″N 3°02′54″W	Category C(S)	38325	Upload Photo
15 Linkfield Road				55°56′43″N 3°02′28″W	Category B	38341	Upload Photo
Newbigging Our Lady Of Loretto And St Michael R C Church				55°56′30″N 3°02′54″W	Category B	38358	Upload Photo
New Bridge Between Bridge Street And High Street				55°56′32″N 3°03′17″W	Category B	38363	Upload Photo
8 Bridge Street				55°56′34″N 3°03′22″W	Category B	38258	Upload Photo
29 Dalrymple Loan, Primrose House				55°56′27″N 3°03′10″W	Category B	38269	Upload Photo
13 Eskside West				55°56′36″N 3°03′15″W	Category C(S)	38278	Upload Photo
102, 104 And 106 North High Street				55°56′37″N 3°03′35″W	Category B	38373	Upload Photo
180 North High Street Jane Cottage				55°56′38″N 3°03′50″W	Category C(S)	38377	Upload Photo
Station Road Esk Mills				55°56′19″N 3°03′35″W	Category B	38386	Upload Photo
7 High Street				55°56′37″N 3°02′46″W	Category B	38293	Upload Photo
15 High Street (Formerly Parsonage House) Including Gatepiers And Walls				55°56′39″N 3°02′50″W	Category B	38296	Upload Photo
51 And 53 High Street				55°56′36″N 3°02′54″W	Category C(S)	38304	Upload Photo
High Street Tolbooth				55°56′35″N 3°02′56″W	Category A	38309	Upload another image
High Street, St Peter's Church (Episcopal)				55°56′36″N 3°02′43″W	Category B	38319	Upload Photo
18 And 20 High Street				55°56′35″N 3°02′47″W	Category B	38322	Upload Photo
Linkfield Road Loretto School Gate-Lodge And Gatepiers				55°56′43″N 3°02′35″W	Category B	38335	Upload Photo
69 Millhill				55°56′40″N 3°02′58″W	Category C(S)	38350	Upload Photo
1 Mountjoy Terrace				55°56′49″N 3°03′14″W	Category C(S)	38356	Upload Photo
107 Newbigging				55°56′22″N 3°02′53″W	Category C(S)	38359	Upload Photo
Newbigging Lewisvale Public Park, Bandstand				55°56′20″N 3°02′44″W	Category B	38362	Upload Photo
11 And 12 Balcarres Road				55°56′51″N 3°02′49″W	Category C(S)	38250	Upload Photo
47 Bridge Street				55°56′36″N 3°03′24″W	Category B	38255	Upload Photo
28 Eskside West				55°56′33″N 3°03′22″W	Category C(S)	38281	Upload Photo

== Key ==
The scheme for classifying buildings in Scotland is:

- Category A: "buildings of national or international importance, either architectural or historic; or fine, little-altered examples of some particular period, style or building type."
- Category B: "buildings of regional or more than local importance; or major examples of some particular period, style or building type, which may have been altered."
- Category C: "buildings of local importance; lesser examples of any period, style, or building type, as originally constructed or moderately altered; and simple traditional buildings which group well with other listed buildings."

In March 2016 there were 47,288 listed buildings in Scotland. Of these, 8% were Category A, and 50% were Category B, with the remaining 42% being Category C.

== See also ==
- List of listed buildings in East Lothian
