= List of listed buildings in Wemyss, Fife =

This is a list of listed buildings in the parish of Wemyss in Fife, Scotland.

== List ==
Name	Location	Date listed	Grid ref. (Note: Sometimes known as OSGB36, the grid reference (where provided) is based on the British national grid reference system used by the Ordnance Survey. • "Guide to National Grid". Ordnance Survey. • "Get-a-map". Ordnance Survey.)	Geo-coordinates	Notes	LB number (Note: Historic Environment Scotland assign a unique alphanumeric identifier to each designated site in Scotland, for listed buildings this always begins with "LB", for example "LB12345".)	Image
West Wemyss, 22-36 (Even Nos) Main Street				56°08′23″N 3°05′10″W	Category B	16657	Upload Photo
West Wemyss, 2-20 (Even Nos) Main Street				56°08′23″N 3°05′14″W	Category B	16695	Upload Photo
Coaltown Of Wemyss, Main Street, Earl David Hotel				56°09′07″N 3°05′05″W	Category C(S)	46034	Upload Photo
East Wemyss, Main Street And Back Dykes, War Memorial				56°09′32″N 3°03′50″W	Category C(S)	46042	Upload Photo
West Wemyss, Belvedere Hotel Including 1-2 And 5-11 (Inclusive Nos) Coxstool, Ancillary Buildings And Boundary Walls				56°08′24″N 3°05′17″W	Category B	46055	Upload Photo
West Wemyss, 1 Burn's Wynd And Main Street				56°08′25″N 3°05′05″W	Category C(S)	46057	Upload Photo
West Wemyss, Manse Including Boundary Walls				56°08′25″N 3°05′16″W	Category C(S)	46064	Upload Photo
West Wemyss, 57 Main Street				56°08′25″N 3°05′08″W	Category B	19126	Upload Photo
West Wemyss, 38 And 40 Main Street				56°08′24″N 3°05′07″W	Category B	16658	Upload Photo
West Wemyss, 42-52 (Even Nos) Main Street				56°08′24″N 3°05′07″W	Category C(S)	16659	Upload Photo
West Wemyss, Chapel Garden Including House (Ruin), Sea Wall And Towers, Wemyss Burial Enclosure And House				56°08′23″N 3°05′49″W	Category B	16671	Upload Photo
West Wemyss, Harbour				56°08′21″N 3°05′25″W	Category C(S)	16675	Upload Photo
West Wemyss, 3 And 4 Coxstool With Boundary Wall				56°08′24″N 3°05′17″W	Category B	16692	Upload Photo
West Wemyss, Main Street, Tolbooth				56°08′23″N 3°05′10″W	Category B	16694	Upload another image
East Wemyss, Main Road, The Carshed Shop				56°09′28″N 3°04′11″W	Category C(S)	46039	Upload Photo
East Wemyss, 15 Main Street With Boundary Walls				56°09′33″N 3°03′51″W	Category C(S)	46040	Upload Photo
Standing Stane Road, Cowdenlaws				56°08′53″N 3°07′06″W	Category C(S)	46047	Upload Photo
Standing Stane Road, Wellsgreen With Well, Boundary Walls, Gatepiers And Gates				56°10′25″N 3°03′59″W	Category C(S)	46050	Upload Photo
West Wemyss, Main Street, Wemyss Arms				56°08′25″N 3°05′06″W	Category C(S)	46063	Upload Photo
West Wemyss Toll				56°08′50″N 3°05′53″W	Category C(S)	46067	Upload Photo
Wemyss Castle Policies, West Entrance, Dysart Lodge, Gatepiers, Gates And Boundary Walls				56°08′16″N 3°06′47″W	Category C(S)	19127	Upload Photo
Wemyss Castle Policies, Dovecot				56°08′36″N 3°04′56″W	Category B	16670	Upload Photo
Coaltown Of Wemyss, Main Street, Miners' Welfare Institute And War Memorial				56°09′04″N 3°05′22″W	Category C(S)	46035	Upload Photo
East Wemyss 29 And 31 Main Road				56°09′30″N 3°04′11″W	Category C(S)	46037	Upload Photo
Wemyss Castle Policies, Nos 1, 2 And 3 Cottages Including Garden Wall				56°08′51″N 3°04′59″W	Category C(S)	46051	Upload Photo
West Wemyss, 67 And 69 Main Street				56°08′26″N 3°05′06″W	Category C(S)	46062	Upload Photo
West Wemyss, St Adrian's Church (Church Of Scotland) With Boundary Walls, Graveyard And Monuments				56°08′31″N 3°05′00″W	Category C(S)	46066	Upload another image See more images
Wemyss Castle Policies, The Pink House				56°08′45″N 3°05′02″W	Category B	49183	Upload Photo
West Wemyss, 3 Burn's Wynd				56°08′25″N 3°05′06″W	Category C(S)	16696	Upload Photo
East Wemyss, 11 And 13 Main Street, Former Manse With Boundary Walls And Gatepier				56°09′34″N 3°03′52″W	Category B	16705	Upload Photo
East Wemyss, School Wynd, Primary School With Boundary Walls And Gatepiers				56°09′37″N 3°03′53″W	Category C(S)	46043	Upload Photo
East Wemyss, 22 West Brae				56°09′33″N 3°03′57″W	Category C(S)	46044	Upload Photo
East Wemyss, 24 West Brae With Boundary Walls And Gatepiers				56°09′32″N 3°03′57″W	Category C(S)	46045	Upload Photo
Wemyss Castle Policies, The Courtyard (Home Farm) Including Stables And Gatepiers				56°08′46″N 3°04′59″W	Category B	46052	Upload Photo
West Wemyss, 59 And 61 Main Street				56°08′25″N 3°05′07″W	Category B	46060	Upload Photo
West Wemyss, Shorehead Including Boundary Walls				56°08′24″N 3°05′24″W	Category B	16676	Upload Photo
West Wemyss, 12 And 13 Coxstool With Boundary Walls				56°08′23″N 3°05′19″W	Category B	16677	Upload Photo
East Wemyss, Main Street, St Mary's By-The-Sea (Former Parish Church) Including Boundary Walls, Gatepiers And Gates				56°09′32″N 3°03′50″W	Category B	16704	Upload Photo
West Wemyss, 1B Narrow Wynd, Building To Rear Of Wemyss Arms				56°08′26″N 3°05′07″W	Category C(S)	46065	Upload Photo
East Wemyss, Main Road, Bowling Club With Terrace And Walls With Gatepiers				56°09′31″N 3°04′14″W	Category C(S)	46038	Upload Photo
East Wemyss, Main Street, St Mary's By-The-Sea Graveyard, Walls And Gravestones				56°09′32″N 3°03′49″W	Category B	46041	Upload Photo
Newton Farmhouse Including Boundary Wall				56°09′37″N 3°04′46″W	Category B	46046	Upload Photo
Wemyss Castle Policies, Walled Garden With Orangery (Ruin)				56°08′49″N 3°04′49″W	Category C(S)	46054	Upload Photo
West Wemyss, 4, 5 And 6 Burn's Wynd				56°08′24″N 3°05′06″W	Category C(S)	46058	Upload Photo
West Wemyss, 65 Main Street				56°08′26″N 3°05′06″W	Category C(S)	46061	Upload Photo
West Wemyss, 1 - 9 (Odd Nos) Main Street With Boundary Walls				56°08′24″N 3°05′12″W	Category C(S)	16697	Upload Photo
Wemyss Castle				56°08′40″N 3°04′52″W	Category A	16709	Upload another image
Bowhouse Including Boundary Walls And Gatepiers				56°08′37″N 3°06′15″W	Category C(S)	46033	Upload Photo
East Wemyss, 25 And 27 Main Road				56°09′29″N 3°04′12″W	Category C(S)	46036	Upload Photo
Standing Stane Road, Moss Cottage				56°09′26″N 3°06′30″W	Category C(S)	46048	Upload Photo
Wemyss Castle Policies, The Red House				56°08′43″N 3°04′51″W	Category B	46053	Upload Photo
West Wemyss, 5 Broad Wynd With Boundary Walls				56°08′25″N 3°05′11″W	Category C(S)	46056	Upload Photo
Wemyss Castle Policies, East Lodge With Boundary Walls, Gatepiers And Gates				56°09′18″N 3°04′35″W	Category B	19128	Upload Photo
Boreland, Branxton Farmhouse With Ancillary Structure				56°08′23″N 3°07′07″W	Category C(S)	46031	Upload Photo
Boreland, Standing Stane Road, West Gate				56°08′28″N 3°07′23″W	Category C(S)	46032	Upload Photo
Standing Stane Road, Phantassie				56°09′15″N 3°06′50″W	Category C(S)	46049	Upload Photo
West Wemyss, Croftamorie, War Memorial				56°08′29″N 3°05′01″W	Category C(S)	46059	Upload Photo
Gravestone of Reverend Alexander Orrock Johnston, East Wemyss Cemetery, Main Street, East Wemyss, Kirkcaldy				56°09′41″N 3°03′46″W	Category B	52679	Upload Photo

== Key ==
The scheme for classifying buildings in Scotland is:

- Category A: "buildings of national or international importance, either architectural or historic; or fine, little-altered examples of some particular period, style or building type."
- Category B: "buildings of regional or more than local importance; or major examples of some particular period, style or building type, which may have been altered."
- Category C: "buildings of local importance; lesser examples of any period, style, or building type, as originally constructed or moderately altered; and simple traditional buildings which group well with other listed buildings."

In March 2016 there were 47,288 listed buildings in Scotland. Of these, 8% were Category A, and 50% were Category B, with the remaining 42% being Category C.

== See also ==
- List of listed buildings in Fife
