= List of listed buildings in Lerwick =

This is a list of listed buildings in the parish of Lerwick, in Shetland, Scotland.

== List ==
| Name | Location | Date Listed | Grid Ref. (Note: Sometimes known as OSGB36, the grid reference (where provided) is based on the British national grid reference system used by the Ordnance Survey. • "Guide to National Grid". Ordnance Survey. • "Get-a-map". Ordnance Survey.) | Geo-coordinates | Notes | LB Number (Note: Historic Environment Scotland assign a unique alphanumeric identifier to each designated site in Scotland, for listed buildings this always begins with "LB", for example "LB12345".) | Image |
|---|---|---|---|---|---|---|---|
| 169-171 (Odd Nos) Commercial Street, Including Gate And Gatepiers | | | | 60°09′16″N 1°08′39″W | Category C(S) | 43587 | Upload Photo |
| 86 Commercial Street | | | | 60°09′14″N 1°08′37″W | Category B | 43598 | Upload Photo |
| 106 Commercial Street, Clydesdale Bank | | | | 60°09′16″N 1°08′37″W | Category C(S) | 43601 | Upload another image |
| Market Cross | | | | 60°09′11″N 1°08′33″W | Category C(S) | 43628 | Upload another image |
| Freefield, Hay's Dock And Storehouse | | | | 60°09′30″N 1°09′00″W | Category B | 37261 | Upload another image |
| 12-14 (Even Nos) Greenfield Place, St Magnus' Episcopal Church And Rectory, Including Boundary Walls | | | | 60°09′07″N 1°08′20″W | Category B | 37270 | Upload another image |
| 44-50 (Even Nos) Commercial Street, Lerwick Post Office, With Yard Wall And Gatepiers | | | | 60°09′11″N 1°08′29″W | Category B | 37276 | Upload another image |
| 2-4 (Even Nos) Greenfield Place | | | | 60°09′06″N 1°08′27″W | Category B | 37237 | Upload Photo |
| Hillhead And Knab Road, Annsbrae House And 1 And 2 Annsbrae Place, Including Outbuildings, Gates, Gatepiers, Boundary Walls And Railings | | | | 60°09′05″N 1°08′31″W | Category B | 37257 | Upload Photo |
| 12 Charlotte Street, Lystina House, Including Boundary Walls, Gates And Gatepiers | | | | 60°09′16″N 1°08′46″W | Category C(S) | 43579 | Upload Photo |
| 167 Commercial Street | | | | 60°09′16″N 1°08′38″W | Category C(S) | 43586 | Upload Photo |
| 38-42 (Even Nos) Commercial Street | | | | 60°09′11″N 1°08′28″W | Category B | 43591 | Upload Photo |
| 60-62 (Even Nos) Commercial Street, Anderson & Co | | | | 60°09′11″N 1°08′33″W | Category C(S) | 43593 | Upload Photo |
| 66 Commercial Street | | | | 60°09′12″N 1°08′35″W | Category C(S) | 43595 | Upload Photo |
| 90-92 (Even Nos) Commercial Street | | | | 60°09′15″N 1°08′37″W | Category C(S) | 43599 | Upload Photo |
| 116-126 (Even Nos) Commercial Street, Charlotte Place | | | | 60°09′18″N 1°08′37″W | Category B | 43602 | Upload Photo |
| Kantersted Road, Seafield, Including Steading, Boundary Walls, Gatepiers, Railings, And Gates | | | | 60°08′32″N 1°09′45″W | Category B | 43618 | Upload Photo |
| King Harald Street, Islesburgh House, Including Boundary Walls, Gatepiers And Steps | | | | 60°09′13″N 1°08′58″W | Category B | 43620 | Upload another image |
| 32-36 (Even Nos) King Harald Street, Summerside, Solheim And Carradale, Including Boundary Walls, Railings, Gates, And Gatepiers | | | | 60°09′08″N 1°08′52″W | Category C(S) | 43621 | Upload another image |
| Market Street, Garrison Theatre | | | | 60°09′18″N 1°08′46″W | Category C(S) | 43629 | Upload Photo |
| Prince Alfred Street, 1 And 2 Carlton Place, Including Boundary Wall And Gate | | | | 60°09′10″N 1°08′47″W | Category C(S) | 43632 | Upload Photo |
| 4-8 (Even Nos) Queen's Lane And 1 Queen's Place | | | | 60°09′08″N 1°08′30″W | Category C(S) | 43633 | Upload Photo |
| 26 Church Road, Including Boundary Walls | | | | 60°09′06″N 1°08′29″W | Category B | 37260 | Upload Photo |
| Twageos Road, Anderson High School (Formerly Anderson Institute), Including Wings, Boundary Walls, Railing, And Gatepiers | | | | 60°08′59″N 1°08′12″W | Category B | 37264 | Upload another image |
| 81-87 (Odd Nos) Commercial Street And 2 Queen's Lane, Royal Bank Of Scotland, With Boundary Wall And Gatepiers | | | | 60°09′11″N 1°08′30″W | Category B | 37267 | Upload another image |
| Esplanade, Between Grieg's Closs And Campbell's Close, The Peerie Shop | | | | 60°09′15″N 1°08′35″W | Category C(S) | 37268 | Upload another image |
| Lower Hillhead And Union Street, St Ringan's Church (United Free Church of Scotland), Including Church Hall, Boundary Walls, And Gatepiers | | | | 60°09′11″N 1°08′48″W | Category B | 37269 | Upload another image |
| 14 Commercial Street, The Sea Door, Including Murray's Lodberry And Macbeath's Lodberry | | | | 60°09′10″N 1°08′18″W | Category B | 37240 | Upload another image |
| 49 Commercial Street, Seafield House, And 1-3 (Odd Nos) Chromate Lane | | | | 60°09′10″N 1°08′25″W | Category B | 37245 | Upload Photo |
| 103 And 105 Commercial Street, Including Heddle's Court | | | | 60°09′11″N 1°08′34″W | Category B | 37253 | Upload Photo |
| Bell's Road And Gilbertson Road, Inches, Including Boundary Walls, Gatepiers And Pump | | | | 60°09′13″N 1°09′18″W | Category C(S) | 43576 | Upload Photo |
| 25 Burgh Road, Including Boundary Walls, Railings And Gate | | | | 60°09′15″N 1°09′03″W | Category C(S) | 43578 | Upload another image |
| 107 Commercial Street And 1 Mounthooly Street | | | | 60°09′11″N 1°08′34″W | Category C(S) | 43581 | Upload Photo |
| 143-151 (Odd Nos) Commercial Street, Grand Hotel | | | | 60°09′14″N 1°08′38″W | Category B | 43584 | Upload Photo |
| 175 Commercial Street, Including Steps And Handrail | | | | 60°09′17″N 1°08′39″W | Category C(S) | 43589 | Upload Photo |
| Esplanade And Irvine Place, Harbour Master's Office, Including Yard Wall | | | | 60°09′13″N 1°08′34″W | Category C(S) | 43604 | Upload Photo |
| Grantfield, Former Ice Factory | | | | 60°09′31″N 1°09′13″W | Category B | 43606 | Upload Photo |
| Hayfield Lane And Gilbertson Road, Hayfield House | | | | 60°09′13″N 1°09′25″W | Category B | 43611 | Upload another image |
| Hillhead, Wesley (Methodist) Manse, Including Outbuilding, Boundary Walls, Railings And Gatepiers | | | | 60°09′09″N 1°08′46″W | Category B | 43614 | Upload Photo |
| Knab Road, Breiwick Road, And Lover's Loan, Lerwick Old Cemetery, Including Boundary Wall And Entrance Gate | | | | 60°09′01″N 1°08′26″W | Category C(S) | 43623 | Upload Photo |
| 2 Leog Lane, Leog House, Including Boundary Walls And Gatepiers | | | | 60°09′05″N 1°08′16″W | Category C(S) | 43626 | Upload Photo |
| St Olaf Street, St Clement's Hall, Including Steps, Pedestals, Boundary Walls And Gatepiers | | | | 60°09′18″N 1°08′52″W | Category C(S) | 43634 | Upload another image |
| Twageos Road And Midgarth Crescent, Bruce Hostel, With Terraces, Boundary Walls, Entrance Arch, Gates, And Gatepiers | | | | 60°09′01″N 1°08′14″W | Category B | 43638 | Upload another image |
| 24-30 (Even Nos) Commercial Street, Queen's Hotel, And 2 Church Lane, Lifeboat Station, Including Sea Walls | | | | 60°09′11″N 1°08′24″W | Category B | 37246 | Upload another image |
| 1 And 2 Aitken's Place | | | | 60°09′17″N 1°08′47″W | Category C(S) | 43575 | Upload Photo |
| 109 Commercial Street And 2-4 (Even Nos) Mounthooly Street | | | | 60°09′11″N 1°08′35″W | Category C(S) | 43582 | Upload Photo |
| 84 Commercial Street | | | | 60°09′14″N 1°08′37″W | Category B | 43597 | Upload Photo |
| Grantfield, Skipidock | | | | 60°09′31″N 1°09′18″W | Category B | 43607 | Upload another image |
| 11 Greenfield Place, Including Boundary Walls And Gatepiers | | | | 60°09′04″N 1°08′20″W | Category C(S) | 43608 | Upload Photo |
| Gressy Loan, Janet Courtney Hostel, Including Terrace | | | | 60°08′56″N 1°08′10″W | Category B | 43609 | Upload Photo |
| Hillhead And Church Road, St Olaf's Hall (Formerly St Olaf's Church) | | | | 60°09′07″N 1°08′31″W | Category C(S) | 43613 | Upload Photo |
| 14 Law Lane, Windhouse, Including Retaining Wall, Boundary Walls, And Outbuildings | | | | 60°09′09″N 1°08′40″W | Category B | 43625 | Upload Photo |
| Gremista Road, The Bod Of Gremista | | | | 60°10′12″N 1°09′53″W | Category B | 37258 | Upload another image |
| Freefield Road, The Store | | | | 60°24′21″N 1°07′03″W | Category B | 37275 | Upload Photo |
| 2-8 (Even Nos) Commercial Street, Including Sea Wall, Copeland's And Stout's Lodberries And Piers | | | | 60°09′09″N 1°08′13″W | Category B | 37238 | Upload another image |
| 10 Commercial Street, Including Torrie's Lodberry And Boundary Wall | | | | 60°09′09″N 1°08′15″W | Category B | 37239 | Upload Photo |
| 41-43 (Odd Nos) Commercial Street, Lochend House, Including Courtyard, Doorpiece, Retaining And Boundary Walls | | | | 60°09′10″N 1°08′24″W | Category B | 37243 | Upload Photo |
| 101 Commercial Street, And 1 And 2 Gardie Lane | | | | 60°09′11″N 1°08′33″W | Category B | 37252 | Upload Photo |
| 115-117 (Odd Nos) Commercial Street, Bank Of Scotland, Including Railings And Piers | | | | 60°09′12″N 1°08′36″W | Category B | 37254 | Upload Photo |
| 64 Commercial Street | | | | 60°09′12″N 1°08′34″W | Category C(S) | 43594 | Upload Photo |
| Esplanade, Leask's | | | | 60°09′14″N 1°08′35″W | Category C(S) | 43605 | Upload Photo |
| 4 Hillhead, Including Boundary Walls And Railings | | | | 60°09′08″N 1°08′43″W | Category C(S) | 43617 | Upload Photo |
| St Olaf Street And Harbour Street, Parish Church Of St Margaret (Roman Catholic), Including 87 St Olaf Street, Boundary Walls, Gate And Gatepiers | | | | 60°09′20″N 1°08′56″W | Category C(S) | 43635 | Upload another image |
| 9 Commercial Street, The Old Manse, Including Boundary Walls And Wash-House | | | | 60°09′08″N 1°08′13″W | Category B | 37265 | Upload another image |
| 25-29 (Odd Nos) Commercial Street | | | | 60°09′09″N 1°08′19″W | Category C(S) | 37272 | Upload Photo |
| 18 Commercial Street, "Steamer Store" | | | | 60°09′10″N 1°08′19″W | Category B | 37241 | Upload Photo |
| Commercial Road And Harbour Street, Fort Charlotte | | | | 60°09′19″N 1°08′43″W | Category A | 37255 | Upload another image |
| 113 Commercial Street | | | | 60°09′11″N 1°08′35″W | Category C(S) | 43583 | Upload Photo |
| 165 Commercial Street | | | | 60°09′16″N 1°08′38″W | Category C(S) | 43585 | Upload Photo |
| 12 Commercial Street And Scarfataing, Including Sea Wall | | | | 60°09′09″N 1°08′16″W | Category C(S) | 43590 | Upload Photo |
| Hillhead And King Erik Street, Lerwick War Memorial | | | | 60°09′16″N 1°08′49″W | Category B | 43612 | Upload another image |
| 4-8 (Even Nos) Law Lane | | | | 60°09′10″N 1°08′37″W | Category B | 43624 | Upload Photo |
| Lower Hillhead And Prince Alfred Street, 3-6 (Inclusive Nos) Carlton Place | | | | 60°09′10″N 1°08′46″W | Category C(S) | 43627 | Upload Photo |
| North Ness, North Ness House, Including Boundary Walls And Gatepiers | | | | 60°09′29″N 1°08′45″W | Category B | 37262 | Upload Photo |
| King Erik Street And Market Street, Police Station, County Buildings, And Sheriff Courthouse (Formerly Zetland County Buildings), Including Boundary Walls, Gatepiers, And Railings | | | | 60°09′18″N 1°08′50″W | Category B | 37263 | Upload another image |
| 69-73 (Odd Nos) Commercial Street | | | | 60°09′11″N 1°08′28″W | Category C(S) | 37273 | Upload Photo |
| 32 Commercial Street, Old Tolbooth | | | | 60°09′12″N 1°08′26″W | Category B | 37247 | Upload another image |
| 99 Commercial Street | | | | 60°09′10″N 1°08′32″W | Category B | 37251 | Upload Photo |
| Hillhead And Charlotte Street, Lerwick Town Hall, Including Lamp Standards, Gatepiers, Boundary Walls And Railings | | | | 60°09′16″N 1°08′47″W | Category B | 37256 | Upload another image |
| Quarff Church (Church Of Scotland), Including Kirkyard Wall And Gatepiers | | | | 60°06′05″N 1°13′53″W | Category B | 12671 | Upload another image |
| Burgh Road, Gilbertson Park Boundary Wall, Gates, And Gatepiers | | | | 60°09′17″N 1°09′14″W | Category B | 43577 | Upload Photo |
| 51-61 (Odd Nos) Commercial Street | | | | 60°09′11″N 1°08′25″W | Category C(S) | 43580 | Upload Photo |
| 173 Commercial Street | | | | 60°09′17″N 1°08′38″W | Category C(S) | 43588 | Upload Photo |
| 52 Commercial Street, With Gatepiers | | | | 60°09′11″N 1°08′31″W | Category C(S) | 43592 | Upload Photo |
| 80-82 (Even Nos) Commercial Street | | | | 60°09′13″N 1°08′36″W | Category B | 43596 | Upload Photo |
| Esplanade, Ellesmere Buildings | | | | 60°09′12″N 1°08′33″W | Category C(S) | 43603 | Upload Photo |
| King Harald Street And Union Street, Islesburgh Community Centre (Formerly Lerwick Central Public School), Including Playshelters, Boundary Walls, Railings, Gates, And Gatepiers | | | | 60°09′10″N 1°08′57″W | Category B | 43619 | Upload another image |
| North Ness, Gutters' Hut | | | | 60°09′32″N 1°08′44″W | Category B | 43630 | Upload Photo |
| 78 St Olaf Street, Vogalee, With Boundary Walls, Railings And Gate | | | | 60°09′16″N 1°08′52″W | Category C(S) | 43636 | Upload Photo |
| Sea Road, Westhall, Including Boundary And Terrace Walls | | | | 60°08′26″N 1°09′47″W | Category C(S) | 43637 | Upload Photo |
| Commercial Street, 1 Hayfield Court, Including Garden Walls And Railing | | | | 60°09′09″N 1°08′16″W | Category C(S) | 37271 | Upload Photo |
| Commercial Street, Telephone Kiosk | | | | 60°09′16″N 1°08′34″W | Category B | 37277 | Upload Photo |
| 93-95 (Odd Nos) Commercial Street | | | | 60°09′11″N 1°08′31″W | Category C(S) | 37249 | Upload Photo |
| 97 Commercial Street | | | | 60°09′11″N 1°08′32″W | Category B | 37250 | Upload Photo |
| Gulberwick Church (Church Of Scotland), Including Kirkyard Wall, Gate And Gatepiers | | | | 60°07′57″N 1°12′20″W | Category C(S) | 44555 | Upload Photo |
| 96 Commercial Street, Medical Hall | | | | 60°09′15″N 1°08′37″W | Category C(S) | 43600 | Upload Photo |
| 1-7 (Odd Nos) Harbour Street, And 1-3 (Odd Nos) Commercial Road, Brentham Place | | | | 60°09′23″N 1°08′42″W | Category B | 43610 | Upload Photo |
| 12 Hillhead, Including Boundary Walls, Railings And Gatepiers | | | | 60°09′09″N 1°08′44″W | Category B | 43615 | Upload Photo |
| 2 Hillhead, Gordon Cottage, Including Boundary Walls And Railings | | | | 60°09′07″N 1°08′43″W | Category B | 43616 | Upload Photo |
| North Ness, Jahara, Including Boundary Walls And Gatepiers | | | | 60°09′28″N 1°08′45″W | Category C(S) | 43631 | Upload Photo |
| 31 Commercial Street, Quendale House, Including Retaining, Steps, Boundary Wall, Railing, Gatepiers And Gate | | | | 60°09′09″N 1°08′20″W | Category B | 37266 | Upload another image |
| Esplanade, Albert Building | | | | 60°09′19″N 1°08′35″W | Category B | 37274 | Upload another image |
| 1-12 (Even Nos) Twageos Road, Anderson Homes | | | | 60°09′06″N 1°08′07″W | Category C(S) | 37278 | Upload Photo |
| 1 Greenfield Place, St Columba's Church (Church Of Scotland), Including Gates, Retaining And Boundary Walls | | | | 60°09′06″N 1°08′29″W | Category B | 37236 | Upload another image |
| 20 Commercial Street, The Lodberrie, Including Bains Beach Sea Wall And Steps, Craigie Stane Noost And Sea Wall | | | | 60°09′10″N 1°08′21″W | Category A | 37242 | Upload Photo |
| 45 Commercial Street, Sea Winds | | | | 60°09′10″N 1°08′24″W | Category B | 37244 | Upload Photo |
| 67 Commercial Street And 1 Church Lane (Formerly South Kirk Closs) | | | | 60°09′11″N 1°08′27″W | Category B | 37248 | Upload Photo |

== Key ==
The scheme for classifying buildings in Scotland is:

- Category A: "buildings of national or international importance, either architectural or historic; or fine, little-altered examples of some particular period, style or building type."
- Category B: "buildings of regional or more than local importance; or major examples of some particular period, style or building type, which may have been altered."
- Category C: "buildings of local importance; lesser examples of any period, style, or building type, as originally constructed or moderately altered; and simple traditional buildings which group well with other listed buildings."

In March 2016 there were 47,288 listed buildings in Scotland. Of these, 8% were Category A, and 50% were Category B, with the remaining 42% being Category C.
