= Musselburgh Tolbooth =

Municipal building in Musselburgh, Scotland

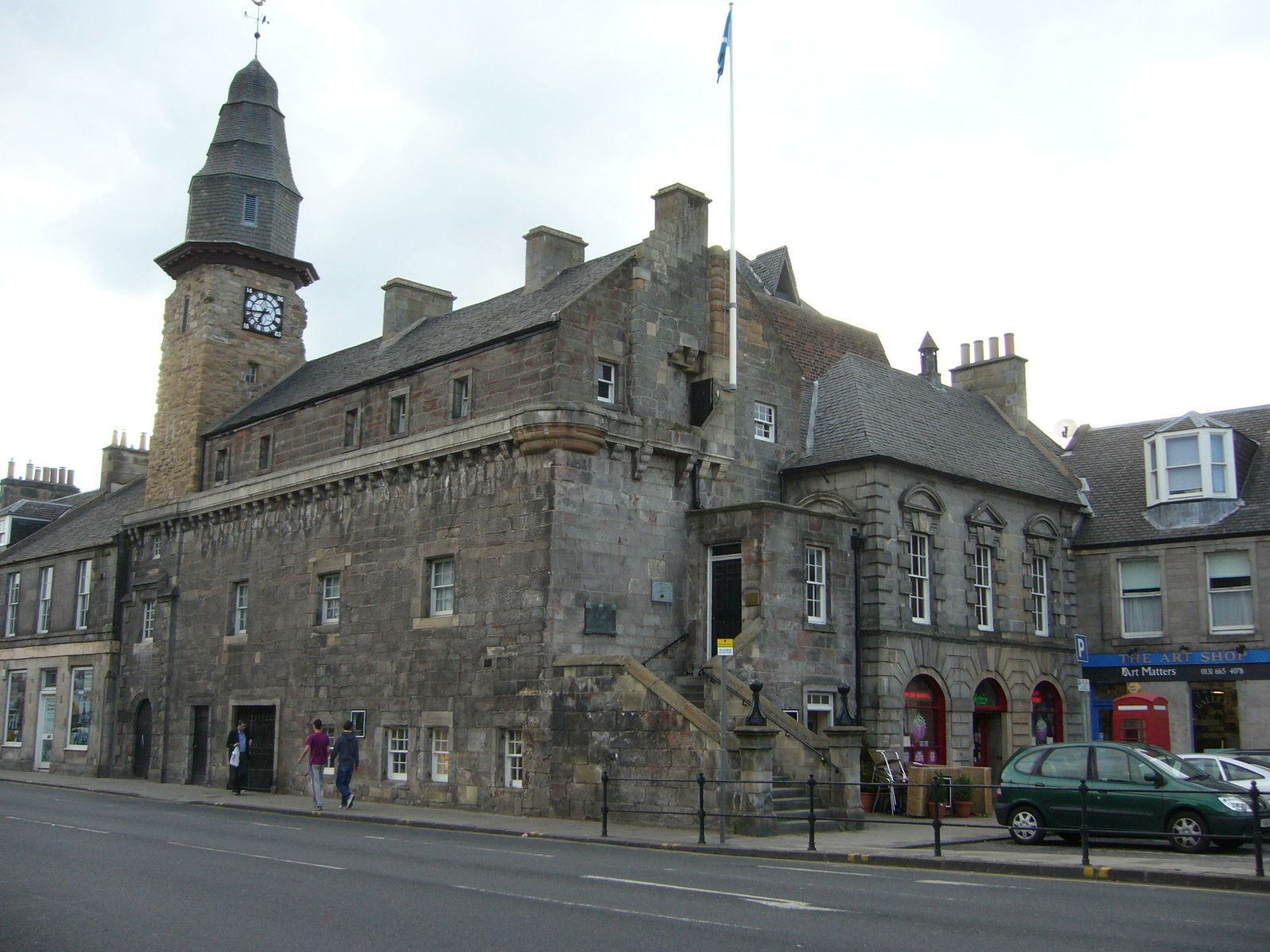
- Musselburgh Tolbooth (on the left of the image) and (on the right, at right angles to the tolbooth) Musselburgh Town House

- Shown in East Lothian
- 55.9431°N 3.0487°W
- Location: High Street, Musselburgh

History
- Built: 1590

Site notes
- Architectural style: Scottish medieval style

Listed Building – Category A
- Official name: High Street Tolbooth
- Designated: 22 January 1971
- Reference no.: LB38309

Listed Building – Category A
- Official name: Town House
- Designated: 22 January 1971
- Reference no.: LB38308

Musselburgh Tolbooth is a municipal building in the High Street in Musselburgh, East Lothian, Scotland. The tolbooth, which was the headquarters of Musselburgh Burgh Council, is a Category A listed building. At right angles and attached to it is the Musselburgh Town House.

== History ==
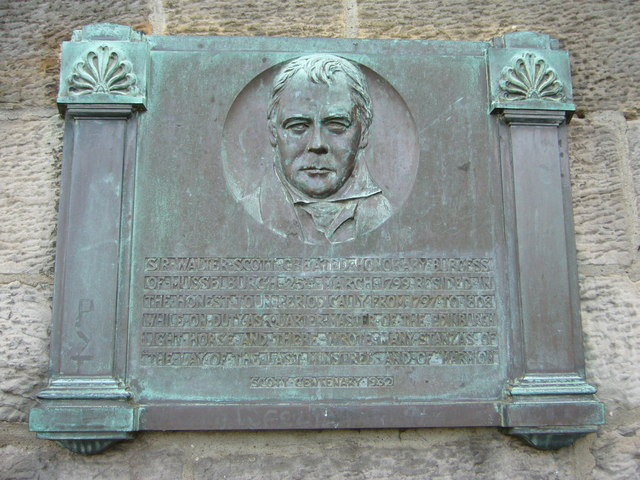
Plaque commemorating the centenary of the death of the novelist, Sir Walter Scott

The first building on the site was a 15th-century tolbooth which was destroyed by Lord Hertford during the burning of Edinburgh in May 1544. It featured a clock tower with a tiered octagonal belfry and steeple: the clock had been given to the burgh by Dutch merchants in 1496.

The current structure, which was designed in the Scottish medieval style and built with ashlar stone, (Note: The ashlar stone was recovered from the Chapel of Our Lady of Loretto which had been destroyed at the battle of Pinkie in 1547: successive popes were horrified by this action and, for 250 years, the people of Musselburgh were annually excommunicated from the Catholic Church.) was completed in 1590. The design involved an asymmetrical main frontage facing onto the High Street; there was a square tower at the southwest corner which featured an arched doorway on the ground floor, a window with a hood mould on the first floor and then a tall main section, which was constructed in rubble masonry and surmounted with the tiered octagonal belfry and steeple which had been recovered from the first tolbooth. The section to the right on the tower featured a wide pend (passageway) and three small windows on the ground floor, three small but more widely-spaced windows on the first floor and, above a heavily modillioned cornice, five small windows on the second floor. Internally, the ground floor was allocated for market use and the first floor allocated for prison use from an early stage. The tolbooth was the venue for several witchcraft trials including that of Margaret Jo in November 1628 and Janet Lyle in July 1661: Jo was eventually released but Lyle was strangled and then burnt at the stake.

The town house, which was designed by James Crighton in the Palladian style and built in ashlar stone at right angles to the tolbooth, was completed in 1733. The design involved a symmetrical main frontage with three bays facing northeast along the High Street; it featured a rounded doorway flanked by two round-headed windows on the ground floor, and three sash windows on the first floor. The central window on the first floor had a triangular pediment and the other two windows had segmental pediments.

Following the Jacobite rising of 1745, some of the Bonnie Prince Charlie's supporters were imprisoned in the tolbooth before being sentenced to transportation overseas. A council chamber, which was barrel vaulted and accessed using an external staircase, was installed on the first floor of the tolbooth in 1762. A series of vaulted prison cells accessed from vaulted corridors were installed on the first and second floors of the tolbooth in the first half of the 19th century.

A large assembly hall was erected in the area behind the two buildings in the mid-19th century and modified to a design by William Constable in 1901. In 1932, as part of the arrangements to commemorate the centenary of the death of the novelist, Sir Walter Scott, a plaque was placed on the wall of the tolbooth recording Scott's residency in quarters in Musselburgh while serving as a quartermaster in the Royal Edinburgh Volunteer Light Dragoons during the Napoleonic Wars. The complex became known as the "municipal buildings" from around that time and continued to serve as the headquarters of Musselburgh Burgh Council for much of the 20th century until new municipal buildings at Brunton Hall were completed in 1970. The ground floor of the town house was subsequently let for retail use but the first floor of the town house and the whole of the tolbooth subsequently remained vacant: in 2016, an option appraisal was carried out with a view to bringing the upper floors of the tolbooth back into use, with the access either through the pend or through the town house.

== See also ==
- List of Category A listed buildings in East Lothian
- List of listed buildings in Musselburgh, East Lothian
