= West Wemyss Tolbooth =

Municipal building in West Wemyss, Scotland

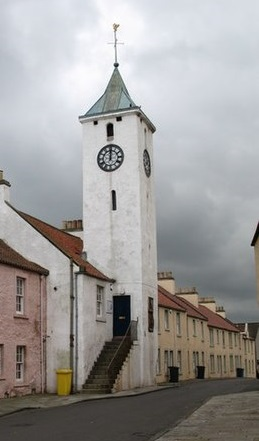
- West Wemyss Tolbooth

- Shown in Fife
- 56.1399°N 3.0862°W
- Location: Main Street, West Wemyss

History
- Built: c.1700

Site notes
- Architectural style: Scottish medieval style

Listed Building – Category B
- Official name: West Wemyss, Main Street, Tolbooth
- Designated: 11 December 1972
- Reference no.: LB16694

West Wemyss Tolbooth is a municipal building in Main Street, West Wemyss, Fife, Scotland. The structure, which is used as commercial offices, is a Category B listed building.

== History ==
The first municipal building in West Wemyss was a medieval tolbooth which was completed around the time that the village became a burgh of barony in 1525. After the original tolbooth became dilapidated, David Wemyss, 4th Earl of Wemyss, commissioned a new structure on the same site. A masonry break suggests that some of the fabric of the lower levels of the original building were incorporated into the new structure.

The new building was designed in the Scottish medieval style, built in harled rubble and was completed in around 1700. The design involved an asymmetrical main frontage with three bays facing Main Street. The central bay was projected forward and formed by an 18 metres (59 ft) high, five-stage clock tower; it featured a panel bearing the coat of arms of the Earl of Wemyss at the top of the first stage, lancet windows in the second, third and fifth stages and an opening to a pigeon loft in the fourth stage. The tower was surmounted by a pyramid-shaped roof and a weather vane in the shape of a swan, recalling the crest of the Wemyss family.

The left-hand bay incorporated a forestair, with a wrought iron railing, which led up to a doorway on the first floor of the eastern elevation of the tower. The right hand bay contained a vaulted pend, which gave access to the sea shore, and both outer bays were fenestrated by sash windows on the first floor. Internally, the principal rooms were the courtroom on the first floor and the prison cells on the ground floor, which were accessed from the pend. The courtroom was typically used by the Earl of Wemyss, as lord of the manor, for baronial court hearings.

In common with many other burghs of barony, the burgh was abolished under the Burgh Police (Scotland) Act, 1892. A new clock, designed and manufactured by James Ritchie & Son of Broxburn, was installed in the tower in 1901. The tolbooth remained in the ownership of the Wemyss family through a limited company known as Wemyss Properties. The roof of the building was refurbished in 1974 and the structure subsequently served as the offices of Wemyss Properties, which carried out some repairs on the tolbooth and adjacent properties in 2001 and initiated the refurbishment of the clock in 2008.

In 2014, the building was occupied by another Wemyss family entity, The Wemyss 1952 Trust. By January 2020 the building was in significant need of repair again and the Wemyss 1952 Trust vacated the building. In January 2022, the Wemyss 1952 Trust submitted proposals to Fife Council to refurbish the building and to convert it, partly into a community hub and partly into short-term accommodation for tourists.

== See also ==
- List of listed buildings in Wemyss, Fife
