= Lerwick Tolbooth =

Municipal building in Lerwick, Scotland

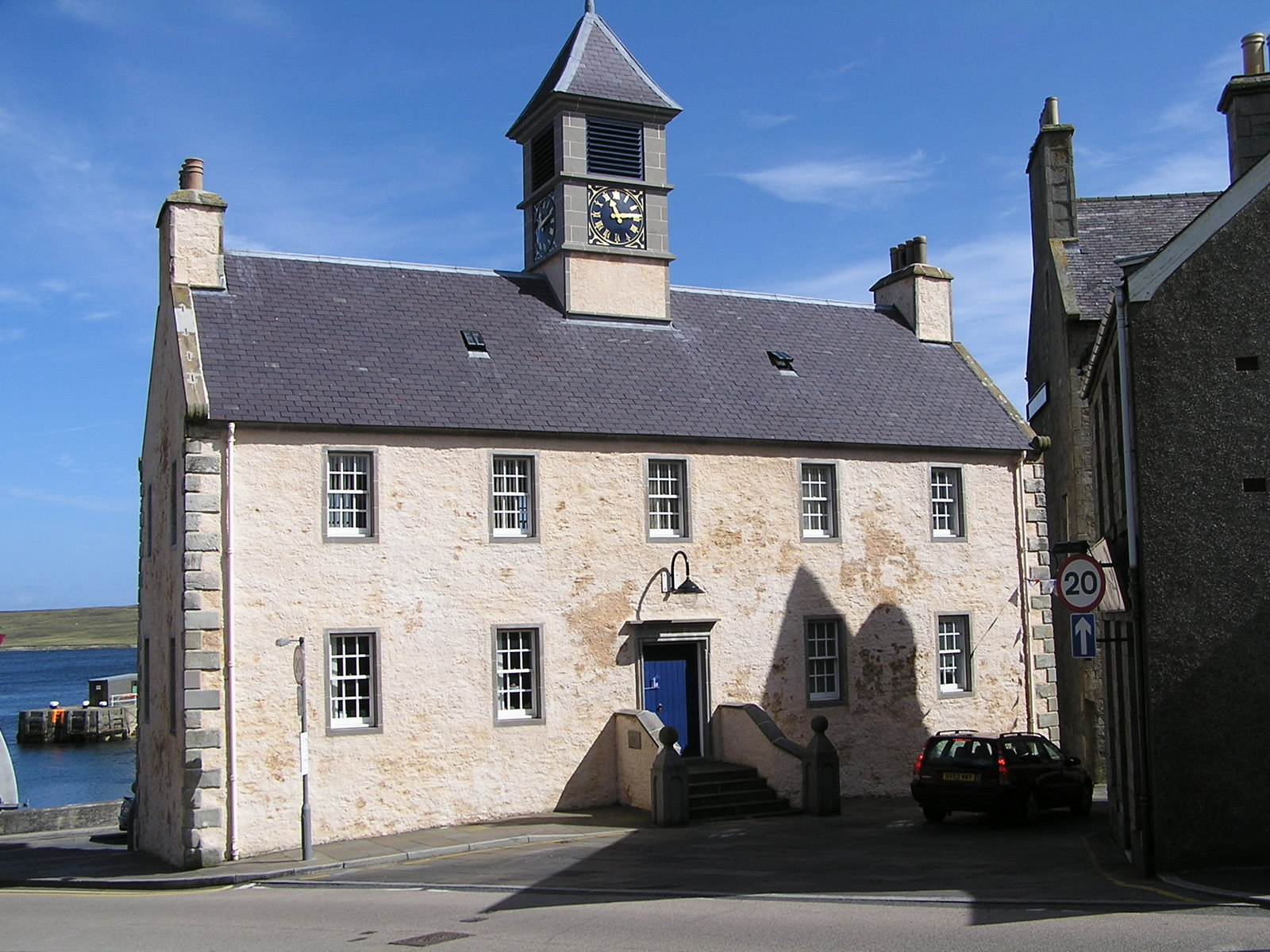
- The building in 2007

- Shown in Shetland
- 60.1532°N 1.1405°W
- Location: Commercial Street, Lerwick

History
- Built: 1770

Site notes
- Architectural style: Scottish medieval style

Listed Building – Category B
- Official name: 32 Commercial Street, Old Tolbooth
- Designated: 8 December 1971
- Reference no.: LB37247

Lerwick Tolbooth is a former judicial building on Commercial Street in Lerwick in Shetland in Scotland. The building, which is used as a lifeboat station, is a Category B listed building.

== History ==
The first tolbooth on Commercial Street was completed in the 17th century. By the mid-18th century, the old tolbooth had become dilapidated and the Commissioners of Supply decided to procure a new building on the same site. The foundation stone for the new building was laid in June 1767. It was designed in the Scottish medieval style, built by Robert and James Forbes in stone with a cement render finish and was completed in 1770.

The design involved a symmetrical main frontage of five bays facing onto Commercial Street. The centre bay featured a short flight of steps leading up to a doorway with a stone surround and a cornice. The other bays on the ground floor and all the bays on the first floor were fenestrated with sash windows. At roof level there was a two-stage tower with a pyramid-shaped spire. Louvres were inserted in the second stage during construction. Internally, the principal rooms were a pair of prison cells in the basement, a courtroom on the ground floor at the west end, a school room on the ground floor at the east end, and an assembly room on the first floor at the east end.

A clock was added to the first stage of the tower in 1825 and the schoolroom was converted into an office for the sheriff's clerk around the same time. In 1836, the prison inspector reported on the poor conditions in which prisoners were held and the prisoners were moved to Fort Charlotte.

By the mid-19th century, the justices were also seeking better facilities. A new courthouse was erected behind the County Buildings in King Erik Street in 1875. The local police constables, who had also been based in the tolbooth, relocated to a new police station behind the county buildings around that time. The ground floor became the home of the local post office from 1878, and a new clock, made by Potts of Leeds, was installed in the clock tower in 1887. The ground floor became the home of the local branch of the Fishermen's Mission in 1912, and remained as such until the mission moved to Harbour Street in 1962.

Zetland County Council acquired the building in 1965 and subsequently rented it out to the British Red Cross, the Shetland Tourist Association and the Women's Royal Voluntary Service. In the later 20th century, the building became dilapidated, and a major programme of refurbishment works was instigated in 2003. The works involved removal of the roof, stripping back the interior to the walls, and the insertion of a steel frame to support the floors inside the building. The works, which were carried out by DITT Construction to a design by PJP Architects, also involved the restoration of the original clock tower which had been removed in 1927. Following completion of the works which cost £670,000 in 2004, the building became home to the Lerwick Lifeboat Station supporting the local lifeboat which was berthed in the harbour just to the north of the tolbooth.

== See also ==
- List of listed buildings in Lerwick
