= List of golf courses designed by Old Tom Morris =

The Old Course was redesigned by Old Tom Morris and Allan Robertson

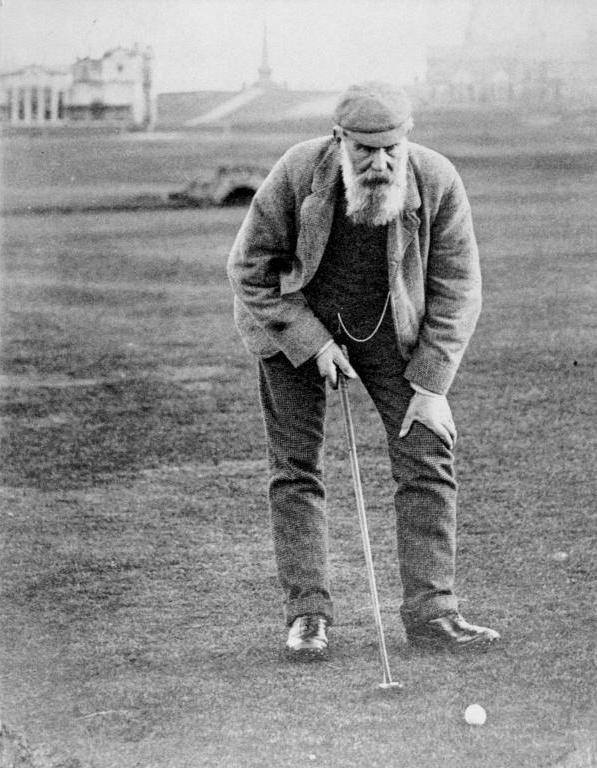
Old Tom Morris playing on the Old Course at St Andrews in 1905

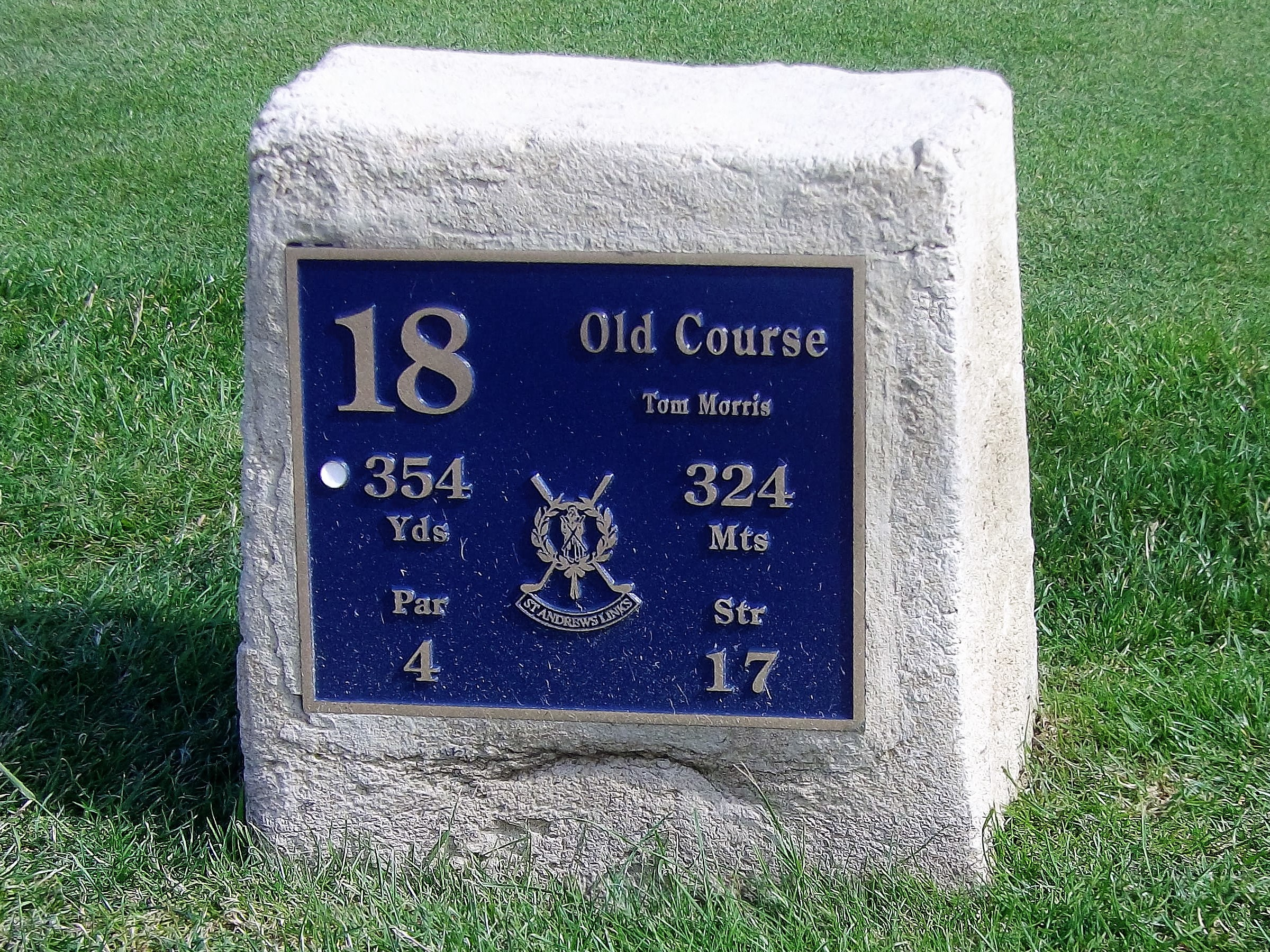
The 18th hole on the Old Course, named in honour of Old Tom Morris

Old Tom Morris (16 June 1821 – 24 May 1908) designed or remodelled about 75 golf courses throughout his life in the British Isles, including The Open Championship courses of Prestwick, the Old Course at St Andrews, Muirfield, Royal Portrush, and Carnoustie. GolfPass has said that "You could make an argument that Old Tom Morris is the greatest golf course architect who ever lived".

== Career ==
Morris started designing golf courses whilst working at Carnoustie, when he was employed as an apprentice to Allan Robertson. Many of the courses that he subsequently designed have since been remodelled, but not all of them. In 1850, Allan Robertson initially designed the Carnoustie Golf Links, Old Tom Morris remodelled and extended it to a full 18 holes in the early 1870s. Carnoustie's only surviving Morris hole is the par 5 6th hole, previously known as "Long", it was officially renamed on 24 September 2003 as "Hogan’s Alley" by the 1999 Open Championship winner at Carnoustie Paul Lawrie in honour of Ben Hogan's victory at the same course in The Open in 1953.

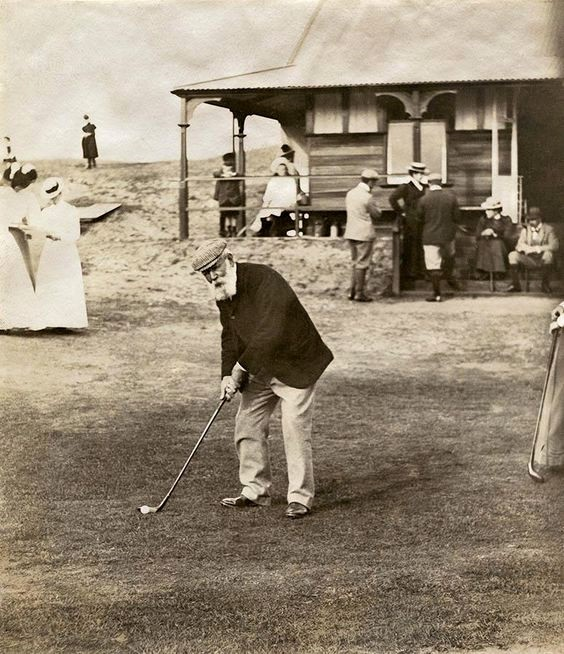
Old Tom Morris playing on The Himalayas putting course

He also laid out The Himalayas, 9-hole putting course in St Andrews in 1867 for the St Andrews Ladies Golf Club. It lies next to the Old Course, north of the Swilcan Burn. It is thought that it was the first minigolf or 'miniature links' course in the world, and it's now both a 9-hole and 18-hole putting course.

Morris introduced many of the greenskeeping techniques that are still used today, including:

- He standardised the length of a golf course to 18 holes.
- The first to use a lawn mower to cut putting greens.
- He is said to have accidentally discovered the benefits of routinely dressing the tops of greens with sand to improve the density and uniformity of the putting turf, when he accidentally spilled a wheelbarrow full of sand onto a green.
- Using fertilisers, lime, sulfates, and compost to improve the growth of the turf.
- Using drainage and irrigation to improve linksland golf courses, by digging shallow wells at each green for irrigation and with making minor drainage improvements to bunkers.
- The first strategic design of hazards such that hazards could work as markers so that players could plan their play around them. Before his time, hazards, such as bunkers, were left alone. Morris began managing the state of these hazards.
- Yardage markers, which tell golfers how far they are from the green. The markers can indicate that they are for example 200 yards, 150 yards, or 100 yards from the green.
- The first tee boxes, also known as the teeing area. Before his time, golfers would tee off for the next hole from the green they had just played.

== Golf courses designed by Old Tom Morris ==
Denotes that the course is on the current Open Championship rota
Denotes that the course has previously hosted The Open Championship, but is not on the current rota
— Denotes that there is no corroborating evidence to suggest that any other architect was involved in designing the golf course

Country	Golf Club (golf course)	Location	Other architects (Note: 'Other architects' includes architects that may have initially designed the golf course, architects that may have subsequently redesigned the golf course or where Old Tom Morris was either a co-architect or assistant to the lead architect. '—' denotes that there is no corroborating evidence to suggest that any other architect was involved in designing the golf course)	Refs
Scotland	Alyth Golf Club	Alyth	James Braid	
Scotland	Anstruther Golf Club	Anstruther	—N/a	
Scotland	Arbroath Golf Links	Elliot	Willie Fernie, James Braid	
Scotland	Askernish Golf Club	Askernish	Martin Ebert	
Scotland	Bridge of Allan Golf Club	Bridge of Allan	—	
Scotland	Callander Golf Club	Callander	Willie Fernie	
Scotland	Carnoustie Golf Links (Championship) (Note: Course is on the current Open Championship rota)	Carnoustie	Allan Robertson, James Braid, James Wright	
Scotland	Crail Golfing Society (Balcomie Links)	Crail	—	
Scotland	Crieff Golf Club (Ferntower)	Crieff	Robert Simpson, James Braid, John Stark	
Scotland	Cruden Bay Golf Club (Championship Course)	Cruden Bay	Archie Simpson, Tom Simpson, Herbert Fowler	
Scotland	Cruden Bay Golf Club (St Olaf Course)	Cruden Bay	Archie Simpson, Tom Simpson, Herbert Fowler	
Scotland	Cullen Links Golf Club	Cullen	Charlie Neaves	
Scotland	Dunbar Golf Club	Dunbar	Ben Sayers, James Braid	
Scotland	Dunkeld and Birnam Golf Club	Dunkeld	—	
Scotland	Forfar Golf Club	Forfar	James Braid	
Scotland	Glasgow Golf Club	Bearsden	James Braid, Dave Thomas	
Scotland	The Golf House Club	Elie	—	
Scotland	Helensburgh Golf Club	Helensburgh	Tom Turnbull, James Braid	
Scotland	Kinghorn Golf Club	Kinghorn	Willie Fernie	
Scotland	King James VI Golf Club	Perth	—	
Scotland	Kingussie Golf Club	Kingussie	Harry Vardon	
Scotland	Kirkcaldy Golf Club	Kirkcaldy	—	
Scotland	Ladybank Golf Club	Ladybank	—	
Scotland	Lanark Golf Club	Lanark	George Sayers, James Braid	
Scotland	Leslie Golf Club	Leslie	—	
Scotland	Leven Links Golf Course	Leven	—	
Scotland	Luffness New Golf Club	Aberlady	—	
Scotland	Lundin Golf Club	Lundin Links	James Braid	
Scotland	Machrihanish Golf Club (Championship)	Machrihanish	Charles Hunter, John Henry Taylor, Guy Campbell	
Scotland	Montrose Golf Links	Montrose	Willie Park Jr., Harry Colt	
Scotland	Moray Golf Club (old course)	Lossiemouth	—	
Scotland	Muirfield	Gullane	Harry Colt, Tom Simpson	
Scotland	Nairn Dunbar Golf Club	Nairn	James Braid	
Scotland	Nairn Golf Club	Nairn	Archie Simpson, James Braid, Ben Sayers, Mackenzie & Ebert	
Scotland	Newtonmore Golf Club	Newtonmore	Tom Watson, Tom Turnbull	
Scotland	North Berwick Golf Club (The West Links)	North Berwick	Unknown, David Strath, Ben Sayers, C. K. (Cecil Key) Hutchison	
Scotland	North Inch Golf Course	Perth	—	
Scotland	Panmure Golf Club	Barry	James Braid	
Scotland	Prestwick Golf Club (Note: Course was formerly on the Open Championship rota)	Prestwick	—	
Scotland	The Royal Burgess Golfing Society of Edinburgh	Barnton, Edinburgh	Willie Park Jr., James Braid, Mackenzie Ross	
Scotland	Royal Dornoch Golf Club	Dornoch	John Henry Taylor, George Duncan	
Scotland	Scotscraig Golf Club	Tayport	James Braid	
Scotland	St Andrews Ladies’ Putting Club (The Himalayas) (Note: Originally The Himalayas was a 9-hole putting course. It is now both a 9-hole and 18-hole putting course, thought to be the first minigolf course ever made.)	St Andrews	—	
Scotland	St Andrews Links (Jubilee Course)	St Andrews	John Angus, Willie Auchterlonie, Donald Steel	
Scotland	St Andrews Links (New Course)	St Andrews	William Hall Blyth	
Scotland	St Andrews Links (Old Course)	St Andrews	Unknown, Allan Robertson, Martin Hawtree	
Scotland	St Michaels Golf Club	Leuchars	Hugh Hamilton	
Scotland	Stirling Golf Club	Stirling	Henry Cotton, Howard Swan, Willie Fernie, James Braid	
Scotland	Strathpeffer Spa Golf Club	Strathpeffer	Willie Park Jr., Tom Vardon	
Scotland	Tain Golf Club	Tain	—	
Scotland	Tarland Golf Club	Tarland	—	
Scotland	Thornhill Golf Club	Thornhill	—	
The West Kilbride Golf Club	West Kilbride	James Braid		
England	Cleeve Hill Golf Course	Cheltenham	Alister MacKenzie	
England	Cleveland Golf Club	Redcar	Harry Colt, Donald Steel	
England	Dewsbury District Golf Club	Mirfield	Ted Ray, Peter Alliss, Dave Thomas	
England	Kendal Golf Club	Kendal	Harry Vardon, Tom Vardon, John Henry Taylor	
England	Kettering Golf Club	Kettering	Mackenzie & Ebert	
England	Kirby Muxloe Golf Club	Kirby Muxloe	Simon Gidman	
England	Lindrick Golf Club	Anston	Tom Dunn, Willie Park Jr., Alister MacKenzie	
England	Mitcham Golf Club	Mitcham	Tom Dunn	
England	Newcastle United Golf Club	Newcastle upon Tyne	—	
England	Northampton Golf Club	Harlestone	Cameron Sinclair, Donald Steel, Willie Park, Jr., James Braid	
England	Royal Cromer Golf Club	Cromer	James Braid, John Henry Taylor	
England	Royal North Devon Golf Club	Westward Ho!	Herbert Fowler	
England	Wallasey Golf Club	Wallasey	James Braid, John Henry Taylor, Sandy Herd, Harold Hilton, Fred Hawtree	
England	Warkworth Golf Club	Warkworth	—	
England	West Herts Golf Club	Croxley Green	John Henry Taylor, Alister MacKenzie, Harry Colt	
Northern Ireland
Northern Ireland	Royal County Down Golf Club (Annesley Links)	Newcastle	Donald Steel, Mackenzie & Ebert	
Northern Ireland	Royal County Down Golf Club (Championship Links)	Newcastle	George L. Baillie, Harry Vardon, Harry Colt, Donald Steel	
Northern Ireland	Royal Portrush Golf Club	Portrush	Harry Colt, Mackenzie & Ebert	
Republic of Ireland	Lahinch Golf Club	Lahinch	Charles Gibson, Alister MacKenzie, Martin Hawtree	
Republic of Ireland	Rosapenna Golf Links (Old Tom Morris Links)	Downings	James Braid, Harry Vardon, Harry Colt, Pat Ruddy	
Isle of Man	Castletown Golf Links	Derbyhaven	Mackenzie Ross	
Isle of Man	King Edward Bay Golf Club	Douglas	—	
Isle of Man	Ramsey Golf Club	Ramsey	George Lowe, James Braid, Steve Marnoch	
Wales	Pwllheli Golf Club	Pwllheli	James Braid	

=== Open Championship courses designed by Old Tom Morris ===
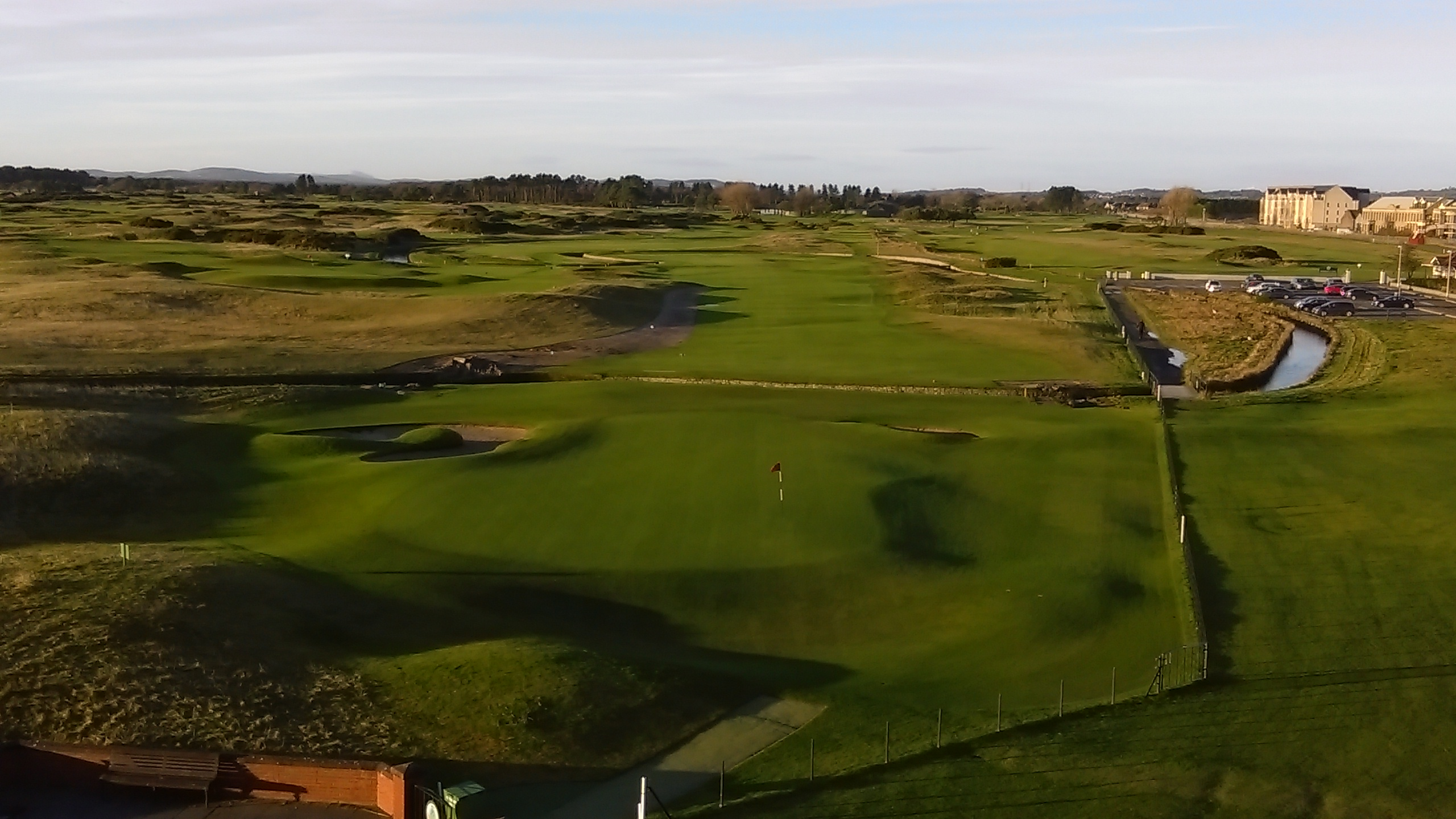
Carnoustie Golf Links

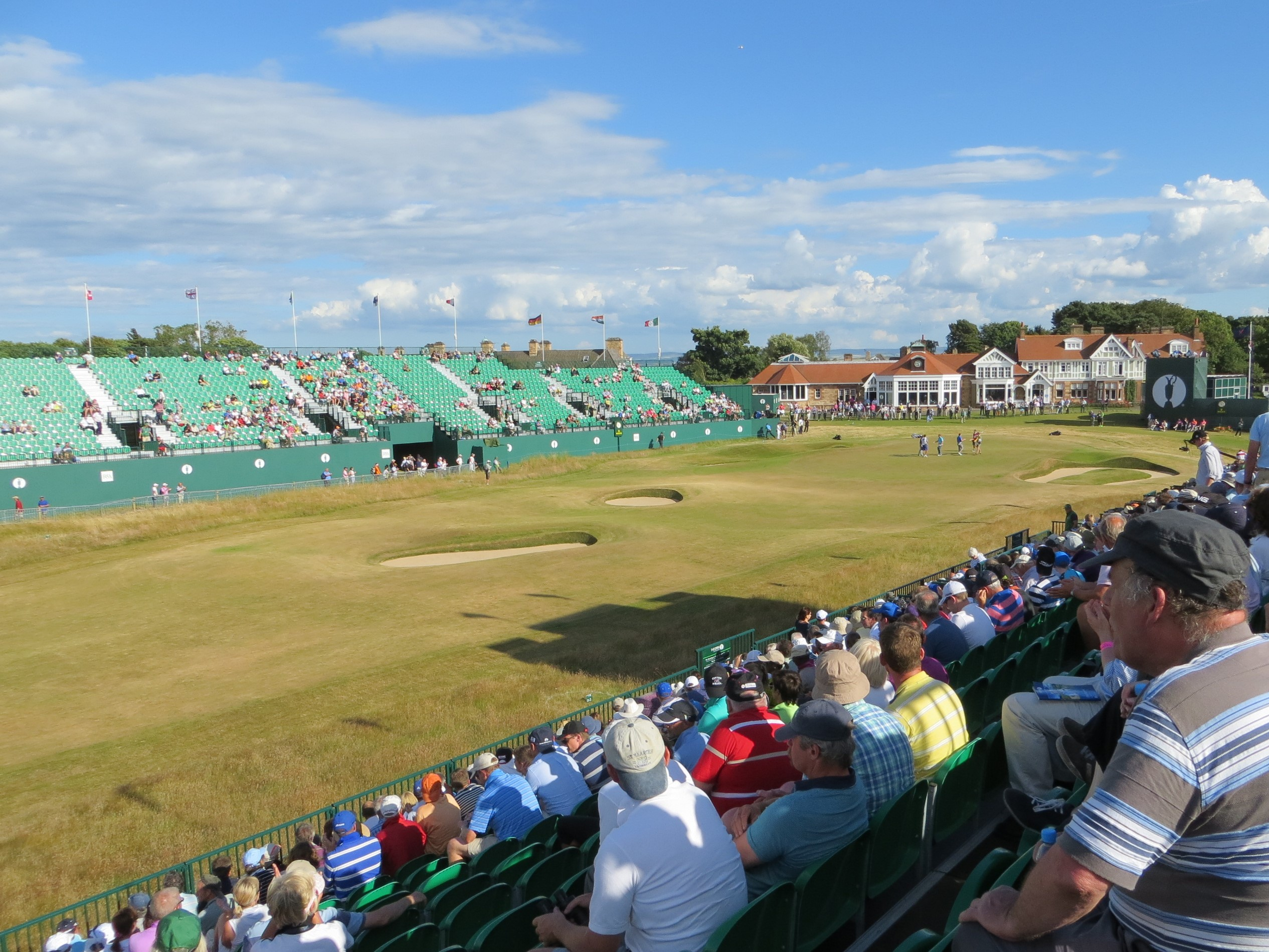
Muirfield Links

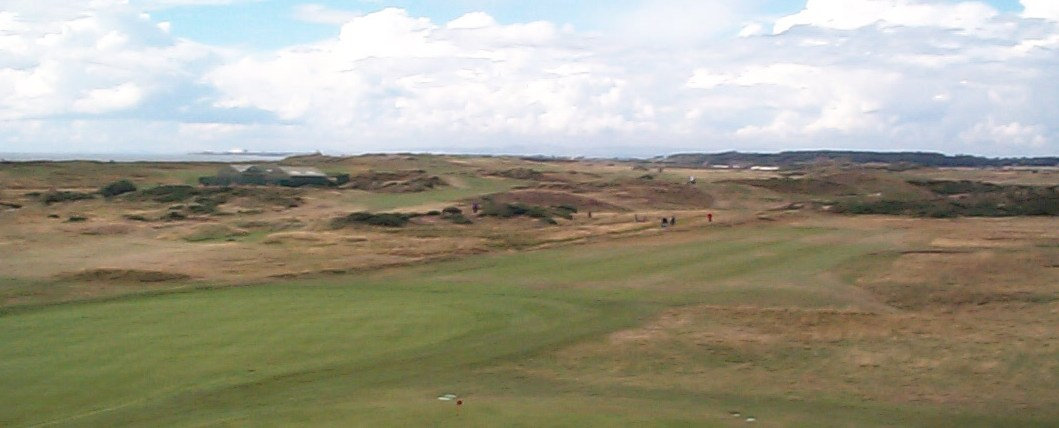
Prestwick Golf Links

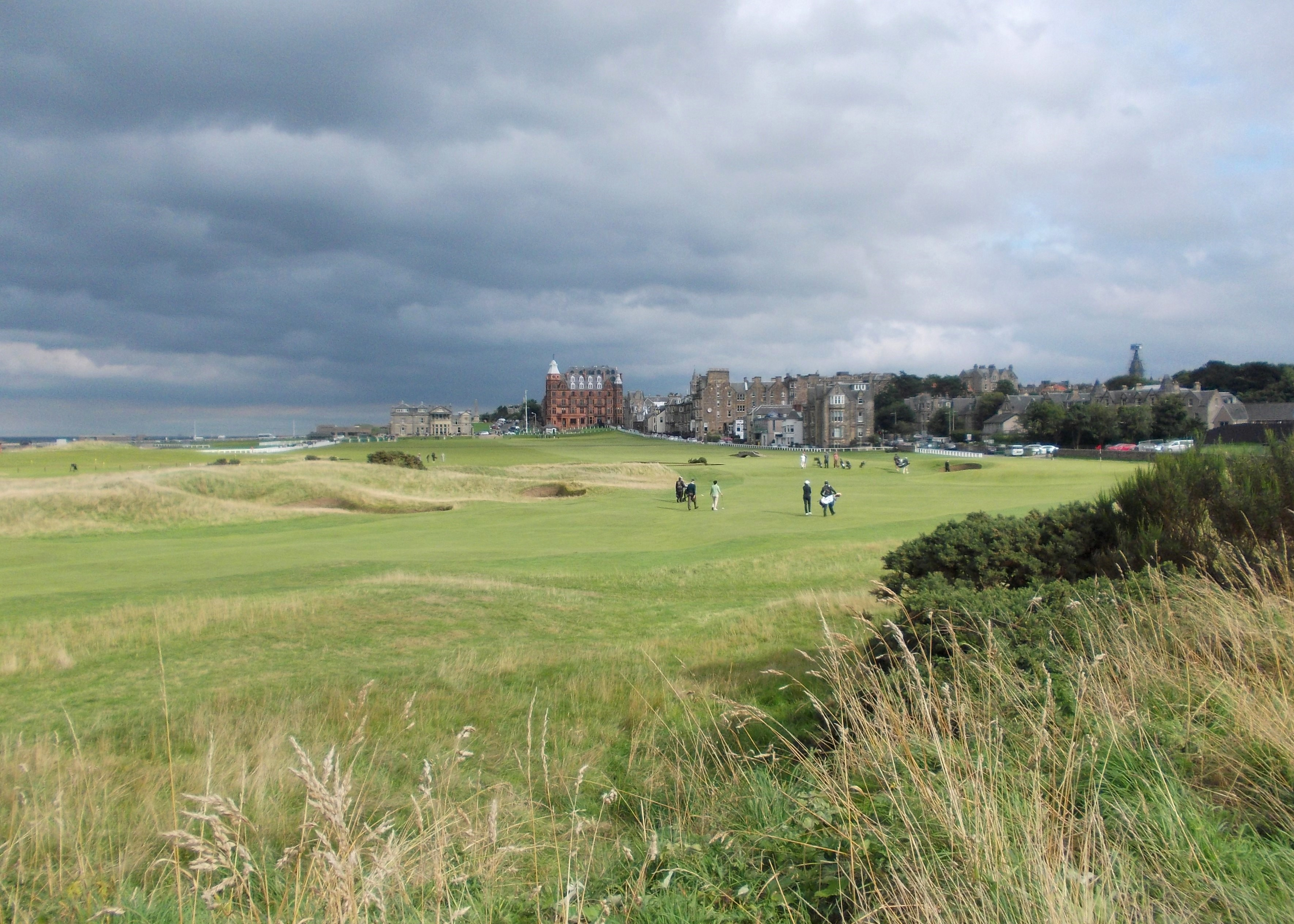
Old Course at St Andrews Links

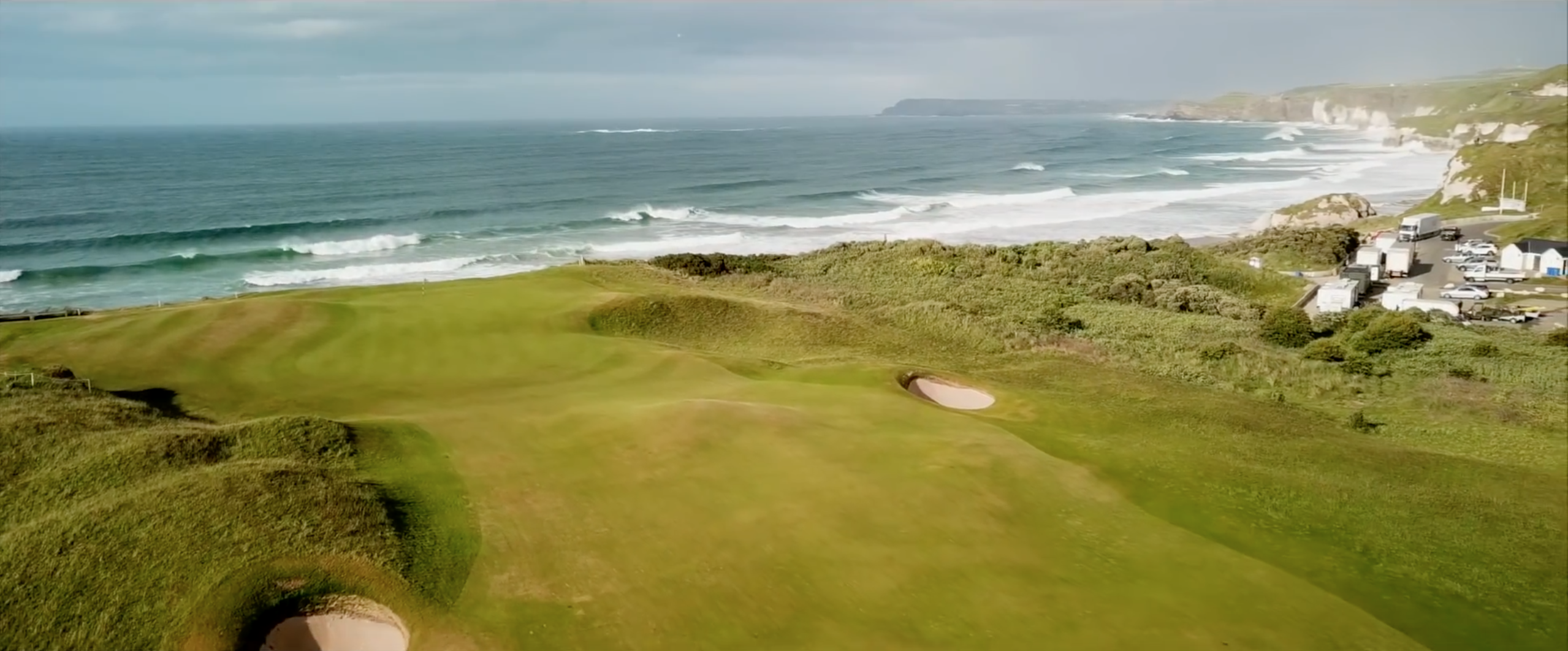
Royal Portrush Links

== See also ==
- List of golf course architects
- Tom Morris Golf Shop
