= RND =

RND may refer to:

- National Rally for Democracy (disambiguation)
- RedaktionsNetzwerk Deutschland, a large newspaper chain in Germany
- Red Nose Day, see Comic Relief
- Reflex neurovascular dystrophy
- Research and development (R&D), especially in domain names as "&" is not a permitted character
- Resistance-nodulation-cell division superfamily
- Rostov-on-Don Airport, air traffic control
- Royal Naval Division
- Royal North Devon Golf Club

== See also ==
- Rnd (disambiguation)
