= Rnd =

Rnd may refer to:

- Rnd (GTPase)
- Rnd (trigraph)
- Ruund language (ISO 639:rnd)

== See also ==
- RND (disambiguation)
- Rand (disambiguation)
- R&D
