= Rand =

Rand may refer to:

== Money and business ==
- South African rand, the nation's unit of currency
- Krugerrand, South African gold coin
- Reasonable and non-discriminatory licensing, type of licensing used in the context of standardisation processes
- Rand formula, formula in Canadian labour law
- Randlord, term used to denote the entrepreneurs who controlled the diamond and gold mining industries in South Africa in its pioneer phase

== Places ==
- Rand, New South Wales, small town in Australia
- Rand, Lincolnshire, small village in Lincolnshire, England
- Brussels Periphery (Flemish territory around the city called Rand rond Brussel in Dutch, commonly shortened to de Rand)

=== South Africa ===
- Witwatersrand, escarpment running through Gauteng region, South Africa; commonly shortened to the Rand (die Rand in Afrikaans), and associated urban area (Greater Johannesburg)
  - East Rand, urban eastern part of the Witwatersrand
  - West Rand, urban western part of the Witwatersrand
- Randburg, area in Gauteng province
- Midrand, area in Gauteng province
- Randfontein, a town in Gauteng province

=== United States ===
- Randsburg, California
- Rand, Colorado, an unincorporated community in Jackson County, Colorado
- Rand, Texas, an unincorporated community in Kaufman County, Texas
- Rand, West Virginia, a census-designated place in Kanawha County, West Virginia

== People ==
- Rand (given name)
- Rand (surname)
- Ayn Rand, Russian-American novelist and philosopher
- Rand Paul, American politician and former ophthalmologist
- Rand (Robotech), character from the fictional Third Robotech War
- Rand al'Thor, main protagonist in The Wheel of Time series by Robert Jordan

== Organizations ==
- RAND Corporation, an American think tank
- Ayn Rand Institute, an American think tank
- Rand Refinery, the world's largest gold refinery
- Remington Rand, American computer firm and general manufacturer
- Ingersoll Rand, diversified American industrial firm
- Rand McNally, American map publisher and printer
- Sperry Rand, American equipment and electronics company
- Rand Club, the oldest members club in Johannesburg
- Rand Afrikaans University, a defunct university that is now part of the University of Johannesburg

== Science and technology ==
- rand, any of a number of pseudorandom number generator functions in various programming languages
- Rand index, technique for measuring the similarity between two data clusters
- R Andromedae (R And), a variable star
- Rand Airport, an airport near Johannesburg
