= Old Course at St Andrews =

Golf course in St Andrews, Scotland

Old Course
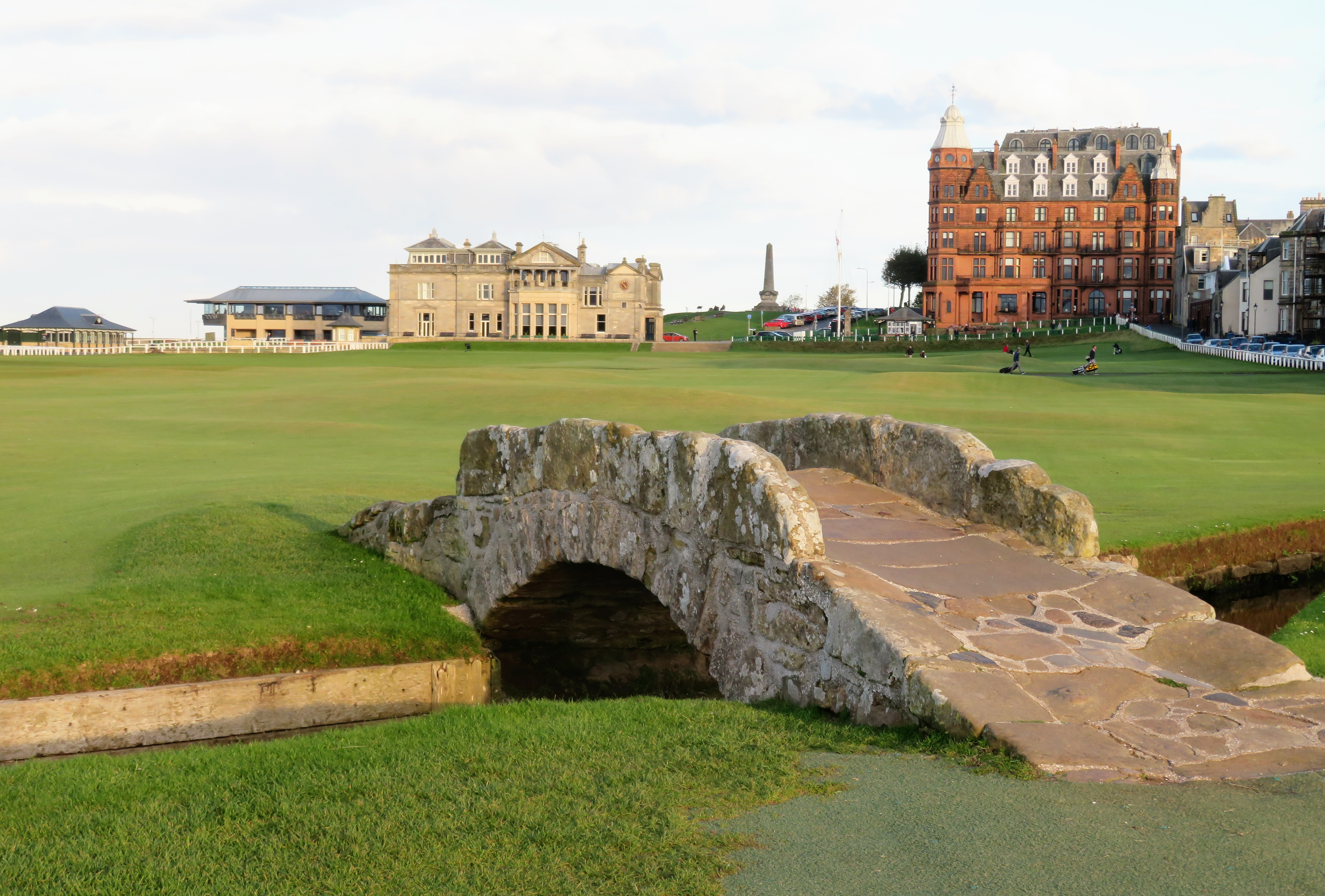
- The Old Course's Swilcan Bridge, 2019

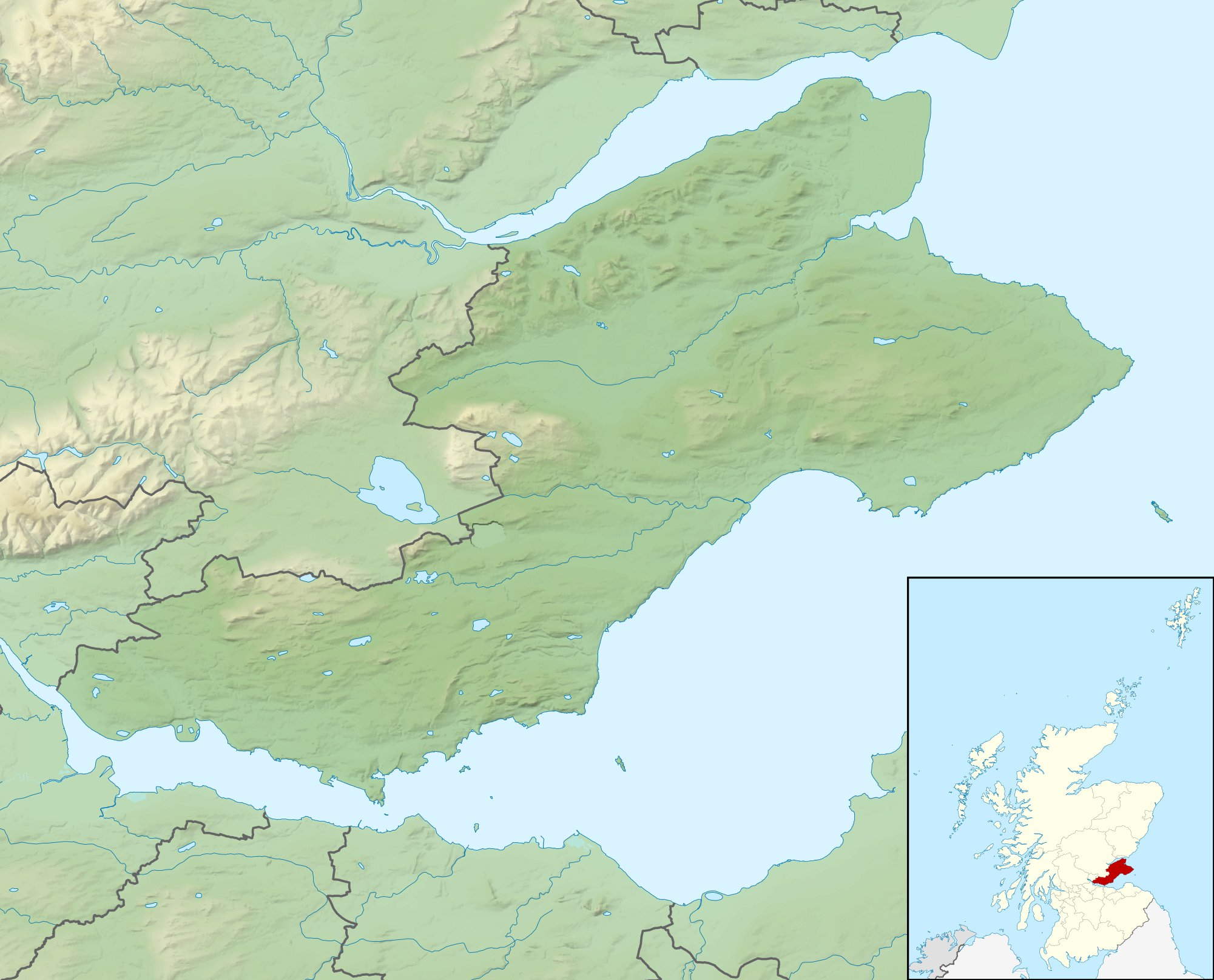
- Location in Fife, Scotland Location in Scotland
- 56.343°N 2.803°W

Club information
- Location: St Andrews, Fife, Scotland
- Established: 1552; 474 years ago
- Type: Public
- Owner: Fife Council
- Operator: St Andrews Links Trust
- Total holes: 18
- Tournaments: The Open Championship, Alfred Dunhill Links Championship, St Andrews Links Trophy
- Website: Old Course
- Par: 72
- Length: 7,305 yards (6,680 m)
- Course record: 61; Ross Fisher (2017); 61; Tyrrell Hatton (2024)

The Old Course at St Andrews, also known as the Old Lady or the Grand Old Lady, is considered the oldest golf course in the world. It is a public course over common land in St Andrews, Fife, Scotland, and is held in trust by the St Andrews Links Trust under an act of Parliament. The Royal and Ancient Golf Club of St Andrews clubhouse sits adjacent to the first tee, although it is but one of many clubs (St Andrews Golf Club, the New Golf Club, St Regulus Ladies Golf Club and the St Rule Club are the others with clubhouses) that have playing privileges on the course, along with some other non-clubhouse owning golf clubs and the general public. Originally known as the "golfing grounds" of St Andrews, it was not until the New Course was opened in 1895 that it became known as the Old Course.

== History ==
The Old Course at St Andrews is considered by many to be the "home of golf" because the sport was first played on the links at St Andrews in the early 15th century. Golf was becoming increasingly popular in Scotland until James II of Scotland banned the game in 1457 because he felt that young men were playing too much golf instead of practising their archery. The ban was upheld by James III, and remained in force until 1502, when James IV became a golfer himself and removed the ban.

=== Governance ===
In 1552, Archbishop John Hamilton gave the townspeople of St Andrews the right to play on the links. In 1754, 22 noblemen, professors, and landowners founded the Society of St Andrews Golfers. This society would eventually become the precursor to The R&A which is the governing body for golf everywhere outside of the United States and Mexico. St Andrews Links had a scare when they went bankrupt in 1797. The Town Council of St Andrews decided to allow rabbit farming on the golf course to challenge golf for popularity. Twenty years of legal battling between the golfers and rabbit farmers ended in 1821 when a local landowner and golfer named James Cheape of Strathtyrum bought the land and is credited with saving the links for golf.

The course evolved without the help of any one architect for many years, though notable contributions to its design were made by Daw Anderson in the 1850s and Old Tom Morris (1821–1908), who designed the 1st and 18th holes. Originally, it was played over the same set of fairways out and back to the same holes. As interest in the game increased, groups of golfers would often be playing the same hole, but going in different directions.

=== Influence on modern golf ===
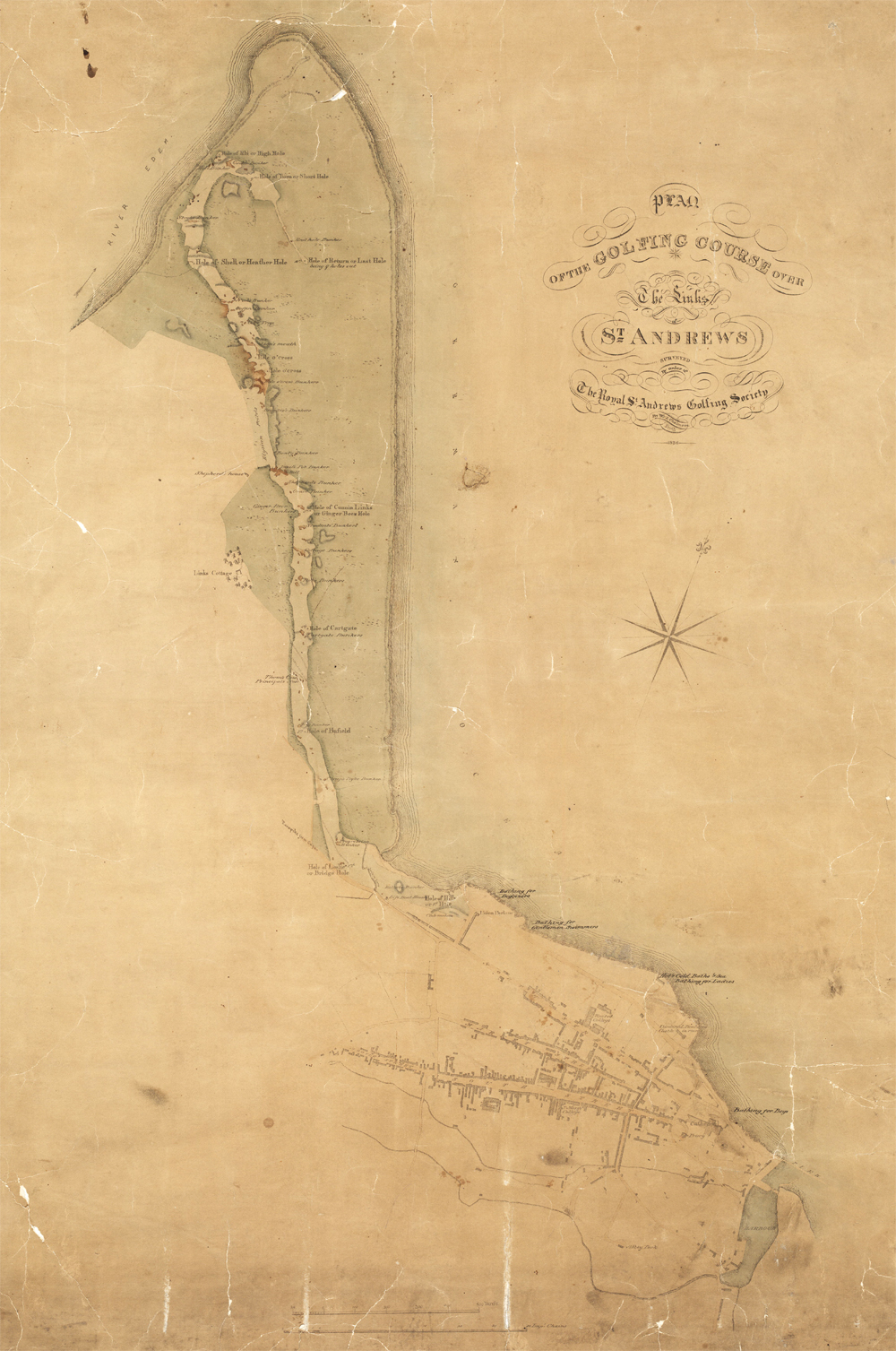
Plan of the Golfing course over the links of St Andrews surveyed by order of the Royal St Andrews Golfing Society

The Old Course was pivotal to the development of how the game is played today. For instance, in 1764, the course had 22 holes and the members would play the same hole going out and in with the exception of the 11th and 22nd holes. William St Clair of Roslin as the captain of The Captain and Gentlemen Golfers authorized changes to St Andrews on 4 October 1764. He decided that the first four and last four holes on the course were too short and should be combined into four total holes (two in and two out). St Andrews then had 18 holes and that was how the standard of 18 holes was created. Around 1863, Old Tom Morris had the 1st green separated from the 17th green, producing the current 18-hole layout with 7 double greens and 4 single greens. The Old Course is home of The Open Championship, the oldest of golf's major championships. The Old Course has hosted this major 30 times since 1873, most recently in 2022. The 30 Open Championships that the Old Course has hosted is more than any other course, and The Open is currently played there every five years.

=== Old Course and Bobby Jones ===
Bobby Jones (who later founded Augusta National) first played St Andrews in the 1921 Open Championship. During the third round, he infamously hit his ball into a bunker on the 11th hole. After he took four swings at the ball and still could not get out, he lost his temper and continued the round, but did not turn in his score card, disqualifying himself. However, he did continue to play in the fourth round. Six years later, when the Open Championship returned to St Andrews, Jones also returned. Not only did he win, he also became the first amateur to win back-to-back Open Championships. He won wire-to-wire, shooting a 285 (7-under-par), which was the lowest score at either a U.S. Open or Open Championship at the time. He ended up winning the tournament by a decisive six strokes.

In 1930, Jones returned to St Andrews for the British Amateur. He won, beating Roger Wethered by a score of 7 and 6 in the final match. He subsequently won the other three majors, making him the only man in the history of the sport to win the Grand Slam. Jones went on to fall in love with the Old Course for the rest of his life. Years later, he said "If I had to select one course upon which to play the match of my life, I should have selected the Old Course." In 1958 the town of St Andrews gave Jones the key to the city; he was only the second American to receive the honour (after Benjamin Franklin in 1759). After he received the key, he said "I could take out of my life everything but my experiences here in St Andrews and I would still have had a rich and full life."

== Features and hazards ==
ESPN has said of the course, "No other golf course has as many famous landmarks as St. Andrews, its 112 bunkers and endless hills and hollows have been cursed for centuries, and many have their own names and legends." In 1949, the last bunker to be filled in on the course was Hull bunker on the 15th fairway.

Hole(s)	Name of hazard or feature	Type of hazard or feature	Notes	Image (Click to expand)
All holes on the course	Direction of play		Until the 19th century, the Old Course was played in a clockwise direction. Old Tom Morris separated the 1st and 17th greens around 1870. From then, the course was played in an anti-clockwise direction on alternate weeks in order to let the grass recover better. The general method of play now is anti-clockwise, although clockwise play has been permitted on one day each year in recent years. The course is closed on Sundays to let the course rest. On some Sundays, the course turns into a park for all the townspeople who come out to stroll, picnic and otherwise enjoy the grounds.	
All holes on the course	Flags		The first (front) nine holes of the course have white flags, while the back nine holes (except the 18th hole) have red flags. The 18th green has a white flag so that it can be seen in front of the red Hamilton Grand building.	7th hole (white flag); 17th hole (red flag)
1 and 18	The Swilcan Burn	Water hazard (Watercourse)	This waterway flows from St Andrews into St Andrews Bay across the Old Course	The Swilcan Burn
1 and 18	Swilcan Bridge	Footbridge	This is a small stone bridge spanning the Swilcan Burn. The bridge is about 30 feet (9.1 m) long, 8 feet (2.4 m) wide and 6 feet (1.8 m) tall. Originally built at least 700 years ago to help shepherds get livestock across the Swilcan Burn.	The Swilcan Bridge
1 and 18	Grannie Clark's Wynd	Footpath	A one lane paved public road. It was once used to haul boats from the town centre down to the West Sands Beach.	Grannie Clark's Wynd
1 and 18	Bunkers		The 1st and 18th holes do not have any bunkers. However, until about 1840 a large bunker called Halket's bunker was in the middle of the fairway, which was then filled in.	The 1st and 18th holes
1, 9, 17 and 18	Greens		The 1st, 9th, 17th and 18th holes have their own greens. All other holes have shared greens.	
2 and 17	Cheape's bunker	Bunker	This bunker is named after Sir James Cheape who bought the golf course from rabbit farmers in 1821. A later generation of the family sold the golf course onto The Royal and Ancient in 1892, who a year later sold it onto the town of St Andrews.	
3	Cartgate bunker	Bunker	A large bunker protecting the third green.	
4	Students' bunker	Bunker	Three small bunkers about 50 yards short of the green allegedly once popular with students wanting to seduce ladies.	
5	The Spectacles bunkers	Bunkers	Two bunkers positioned either side of the approach to the 5th green.	
5	Seven Sisters	Bunkers	The Seven Sisters bunkers were excavated after the 1905 Open by removing the whins.	
5 and 14	The Elysian Fields	Fairway	The fairway between the Beardies bunkers and out of bounds.	
6	Nick's bunker	Bunker		The 6th bunker
7 and 11	Cockleshell bunker	Bunker	A large bunker between the 7th and 11th holes.	
7, 8, 9, 10, 11, and 12	The Loop	A group of 6 holes	Six crisscrossing holes at the far end of the course.	
8	Short Hole bunker	Bunker		
9	Boase's bunker	Bunkers	Deep pot bunkers	
9	End hole bunker	Bunkers	Deep pot bunkers	
10	Kruger bunkers	Bunkers	Built during the Second Boer War when the British were fighting in the Transvaal Republic, whose president was Paul Kruger. The bunkers are called Mrs Kruger and Kruger's mistress.	
11	Hill bunker	Bunker		
11	Strath bunker	Bunker	Strath bunker is located in the front of the green.	
11	Eden bunker	Bunker		
11	Shelly bunker	Bunker		
12	Stroke bunker	Bunker	It is said that once a ball goes in it, the golfer loses at least one stroke.	
12	Admiral's bunker	Bunker	Legend has it that an Admiral who fell into it after taking too long a look at a young American woman in a red mini-skirt and white shoes.	
13	Walkinshaw bunker	Bunker	Legend has it that it was named after a local golfer who kept going into it.	
13	Lions Mouth bunker	Bunker		
13	Coffin bunkers	Bunker	A group of three bunkers located in the centre of the 13th fairway. The shape gives the bunkers their name.	
14	The Beardies bunkers	4 bunkers	Four small bunkers that are said to be difficult to mow, hence the name.	
14	Kitchen bunker	Bunker	A small pot bunker originally shaped like a coffin.	
14	Benty bunker	Bunker		
14	Hell bunker	Bunker	Golf Monthly said that it is "one of the world's most notorious golfing hazards". It covers an area of 300 square yards (250 m^{2}) and between 7 feet (2.1 m) and 10 feet (3.0 m) deep.	Hell bunker
14	Grave bunker	Bunker		
14	Pulpit bunker	Bunker	A pot bunker just above Hell bunker. Golf Monthly said it is so named because "you can look down into Hell (bunker)".	
15	Miss Grainger's Bosoms	2 Mounds	Two prominent mounds on the 15th hole, named for prominent local 19th-century golfer Agnes Grainger. She used to be a member of the St Andrews Ladies’ Putting Club.	
15	Cottage bunker	Bunker	Refers to Pilmour Cottage, which is now Pilmour House and the Eden Clubhouse.	
15	Rob's bunkers	Bunkers		
15	Sutherland bunker	Bunker	In 1869 a tiny bunker about 260 yards behind the much bigger Cottage bunker was filled in only to reappear three days later. The golfer thought to be responsible for restoring it was one AG Sutherland. While it was ultimately determined that Sutherland wasn't the culprit, he had the bunker named after him anyway.	
16	Principal's Nose bunkers	4 bunkers	Legend has it that the bunkers are either named for Mr Haldane, a 19th-century head of St Mary's College who reportedly had a prominent nose, or are a reference to the front porch of Sir Hugh Playfair's South Street House, which was nicknamed thus.	Principal's Nose bunkers
16	Deacon Sime bunker	Bunker	About 30 yards beyond the Principal's Nose cluster.	
16	Grant's bunker	Bunker		
16	Wig bunker	Bunker		
17 (The Road Hole)	The old railway sheds (part of the Old Course Hotel)	Previously railway sheds.		Old railway sheds
17 (The Road Hole)	The Road (Hole) Bunker (a.k.a. the Sands of Nakajima)	Bunker	The Herald has called the bunker "The most notorious golf hazard in the world."	Road Hole bunker
17 (The Road Hole)	Scholar's bunker	Bunker		
17 (The Road Hole)	The Old Station Road and stone wall (out of bounds)	Single-track road		Old Station Road & wall
18	Valley of Sin	Depression	This is an 8 feet (2.4 m) deep depression along the front before the 18th putting green.	

== The Open Championship ==
The Open has been staged at the Old Course at St Andrews 30 times. The following is a list of the champions:

Year	Winner	Score					Notes
Year	Winner	R1	R2	R3	R4	Total	Notes
1873	(Scotland) Tom Kidd	91	88	–	–	179	This was the first time the Open Championship was played on an 18-hole course. Instead of three rounds of 12 holes, there were two rounds of 18. Kidd won £11.
1876	(Scotland) Bob Martin ^{1st}	86	90	–	–	176	Due to a controversial ruling, Bob Martin finished in a tie for first. In protest, his opponent Davie Strath refused to participate so Martin walked the course and became the Open Champion. He won £10.
1879	(Scotland) Jamie Anderson ^{3rd}	84	85	–	–	169	With this win, Jamie Anderson became the first person to break 170 in the Open Championship. He won £10.
1882	(Scotland) Bob Ferguson ^{3rd}	83	88	–	–	171	This was the third straight Open Championship for Ferguson. He won £12.
1885	(Scotland) Bob Martin ^{2nd}	84	87	–	–	171	The second of Martin's Open Championship wins, he won £10.
1888	(Scotland) Jack Burns	86	85	–	–	171	Burns won after his score was re-added, giving him a one-stroke victory. The winner's share was £8.
1891	(Scotland) Hugh Kirkaldy	83	83	–	–	166	Kirkaldy set the tournament record with his 166. This was also the last Open Championship that was 36 holes. The winner's share was £10.
1895	(England) J.H. Taylor ^{2nd}	86	78	80	78	322	This was the first Open to be played over two days (36 holes a day) and a total of 72 holes at St Andrews. He shot the first sub-80 rounds at St Andrews. The winner's share was £30.
1900	(England) J.H. Taylor ^{3rd}	79	77	78	75	309	This open marked the first time the "Great Triumvirate" finished 1-2-3. That was the name given to the three golfers who dominated the game in the late 19th century to the early 20th century. From 1894 to 1914, J.H. Taylor, Harry Vardon, and James Braid combined to win 16 Open Championships. This was Taylor's third of five Open Championships. The winner's share was £50.
1905	(Scotland) James Braid ^{2nd}	81	78	78	81	318	This was the first Open to be played over three days, with 36 holes on the last day. This was Braid's second of five Open Championships. The winner's share was £50.
1910	(Scotland) James Braid ^{5th}	76	73	74	76	299	This Open was the last of Braid's five Open Championships. With this win he became the first person to break 300 in a four-round Open at St Andrews, and was the first to win five Open Championships. The winner's share was £50.
1921	(United States) Jock Hutchison (Scotland)	72	75	79	70	296 ^{PO}	Born in Scotland, Hutchison was the first American citizen to win the Open Championship with this win. This was also the first time Bobby Jones played St Andrews. He ended up walking off the course after he took four shots to get out of a bunker on the 11th hole. The winner's share was £75.
1927	(United States) Bobby Jones (a) ^{2nd}	68	72	73	72	285 (−7)	This win marked Bobby Jones's first Open championship win at St Andrews, his second straight Open Championship, fourth professional major, and his 7th career major (he was a three-time winner of the U.S. Amateur). As an amateur, Jones received no prize money. Aubrey Boomer and Fred Robson finished in a tie for second, and the winner's and second place share of £75 for first place and £50 for second place were combined and divided into two, so each player earned 62 pounds and 10 shillings.
1933	(United States) Denny Shute	73	73	73	73	292 (0) ^{PO}	Shute won the Open title by five strokes in a playoff against Craig Wood. Leo Diegel could have joined them but he whiffed a putt on the 72nd hole, finishing one shot off the lead. The winner's share was £100.
1939	(England) Dick Burton	70	72	77	71	290 (−2)	The 1939 Open was the last Open until 1946 because of World War II. The Royal Air Force used the fairways of the Old Course as runways. Burton held the Claret Jug the longest (7 years), until the tournament resumed in 1946, also at St Andrews. The winner's share was £100.
1946	(United States) Sam Snead	71	70	74	75	290 (−2)	Even though Sam Snead won the first Open Championship to be played since 1939, he still lost money because of the high travel expenses; his winner's share was £150. When taking the train into St Andrews, Sam Snead is quoted for looking out of the window and saying "Say, that looks like an old abandoned golf course" about the Old Course.
1955	(Australia) Peter Thomson ^{2nd}	71	68	70	72	281 (−7)	This was the second of Thomson's three straight Open titles, and five overall. His winner's share was £1,000.
1957	(South Africa) Bobby Locke ^{4th}	69	72	68	70	279 (−9)	Between 1949 and 1957, Locke won the Open title four times. He survived a possible disqualification when he marked his ball on the 72nd green, and played his ball without replacing his ball mark. The R&A decided that because he had a three shot lead, and he didn't gain an advantage, that in the spirit of the game, he should not be disqualified. The winner's share was £1,000.
1960	(Australia) Kel Nagle	69	67	71	71	278 (−10)	This was the 100th anniversary of the Open Championship, although due to wars it wasn't the 100th Open Championship to be played. Arnold Palmer finished second and is credited with returning the Open to the eyes of Americans. The winner's share was £1,250.
1964	(United States) Tony Lema	73	68	68	70	279 (−9)	From 1962 to 1966, Lema won 12 times on tour, but this was his only major. He beat Jack Nicklaus by five strokes, and his winner's share was £1,500.
1970	(United States) Jack Nicklaus ^{2nd}	68	69	73	73	283 (−5)^{PO}	Doug Sanders missed a tough two and a half-foot (0.75 m) putt on the 72nd hole, bogeyed, and ended up tied with Nicklaus. The playoff the next day came down to 18th hole and Nicklaus birdied to win; it was his second Open title and eighth overall major; the winner's share was £5,250.
1978	(United States) Jack Nicklaus ^{3rd}	71	72	69	69	281 (−7)	Nicklaus completed the career Grand Slam (winning all four majors in your career at least once) for the third time making it his third Open Championship. The winner's share was £12,500
1984	(Spain) Seve Ballesteros ^{2nd}	69	68	70	69	276 (−12)	Ballesteros birdied the 72nd hole to win by two. His winner's share was £50,000.
1990	(England) Nick Faldo ^{2nd}	67	65	67	71	270 (−18)	Faldo set the Open championship scoring record shooting 18 under par, winning his second major of the year, his second Open Championship and his fourth overall major. The winner's share was £85,000.
1995	(United States) John Daly	67	71	73	71	282 (−6)^{PO}	Daly defeated Costantino Rocca in a four-hole playoff to win the Open title and £125,000. It was the final Open Championship appearance of Arnold Palmer, and the first for Tiger Woods.
2000	(United States) Tiger Woods ^{1st}	67	66	67	69	269 (−19)	Winning the 2000 Open was Tiger Woods's second consecutive major championship, making him the fifth golfer and the youngest to complete the career Grand Slam. Having won the 2000 U.S. Open at Pebble Beach, he went on to complete the "Tiger Slam" by winning the 2000 PGA Championship at Valhalla Golf Club and the 2001 Masters at Augusta National. Woods did not hit a single bunker the entire tournament, won by eight strokes, and set the new Open Championship scoring record with 19 under par. The winner's share was £500,000.
2005	(United States) Tiger Woods ^{2nd}	66	67	71	70	274 (−14)	Woods' won his 10th major championship; it was the fourth he had won by five or more strokes. It was Jack Nicklaus's last Open Championship. The winner's share was £720,000.
2010	(South Africa) Louis Oosthuizen	65	67	69	71	272 (−16)	On the 150th anniversary of the first Open Championship, Oosthuizen played consistently well, winning the Open title by shooting a 16 under par 272 and winning by seven strokes. Rory McIlroy shot a 63 in the opening round and the winner's share was £850,000.
2015	(United States) Zach Johnson	66	71	70	66	273 (−15)^{PO}	In the 144th playing of the Open Championship, Zach Johnson emerged from a three-man playoff to win the tournament. Tom Watson was given a special exemption by the R & A in order that he could finish his Open career at the Old Course. The tournament finished on Monday due to the extremely high winds that arose during Saturday's round. Johnson defeated Louis Oosthuizen and Marc Leishman in a four-hole playoff. The winner's share was £1,150,000.
2022	(Australia) Cameron Smith	67	64	73	64	268 (−20)	In the 150th playing of the Open Championship, with a final round 64, Smith came from four strokes behind third-round leaders Rory McIlroy and Viktor Hovland to win by one from Cameron Young. Smith's winning score of 268 (20 under par) set a new record for the lowest aggregate over the Old Course in the Open, and tied the championship to-par record, set by Henrik Stenson at Troon in 2016. The winner's share was £2,100,000.

- Note: Multiple winners of The Open Championship have superscript ordinal designating which in their respective careers.
- (a) denotes amateur

== Scorecard ==
Hole	Name	Yards	Par	Hole	Name	Yards	Par
1	Burn	376	4	10	Bobby Jones	386	4
2	Dyke	453	4	11	High (In)	174	3
3	Cartgate (Out)	397	4	12	Heathery (In)	348	4
4	Ginger Beer	480	4	13	Hole O'Cross (In)	465	4
5	Hole O'Cross (Out)	568	5	14	Long	618	5
6	Heathery (Out)	412	4	15	Cartgate (In)	455	4
7	High (Out)	371	4	16	Corner of the Dyke	423	4
8	Short	175	3	17	Road	495	4
9	End	352	4	18	Tom Morris	357	4
Out		3,584	36	In		3,721	36
Source:				Total		7,305	72

Old Course
Tee	Rating/Slope	1	2	3	4	5	6	7	8	9	Out	10	11	12	13	14	15	16	17	18	In	Total
Par	Men/Women	4	4/5	4	4/5	5	4	4	3	4	36/38	4	3	4	4/5	5	4	4	4/5	4	36/38	72/76
SI	Men/Women	10/12	6/14	16/8	8/6	2	12/10	4	14/18	18/16		15/13	7/17	3	11	1	9/5	13/9	5/7	17/15
Black	M: 73.1 / 132	376	411	370	419	514	374	359	166	347	3,336	340	174	316	418	530	414	381	455	357	3,385	6,721
Blue	M: 71.4 / 129	355	395	337	411	514	360	349	154	289	3,164	311	164	304	388	523	391	345	436	361	3,223	6,387
Green	M: 69.9 / 125 W: 75.5 / 138	339	375	321	401	454	325	335	145	261	2,956	296	150	304	377	487	369	325	426	342	3,076	6,032

== Women's British Open ==
Winners of the Women's British Open at the Old Course at St Andrews:

Year	Winner	Score
2007	(Mexico) Lorena Ochoa	287 (−5)
2013	(United States) Stacy Lewis	280 (−8)
2024	(New Zealand) Lydia Ko	281 (−7)

== Senior Open Championship ==
Winners of the Senior Open Championship at the Old Course at St Andrews:

Year	Winner	Score
2018	(Spain) Miguel Ángel Jiménez	276 (−12)

== Structures overlooking the Old Course ==
The following notable structures overlooking the Old Course in a clockwork direction from the north:

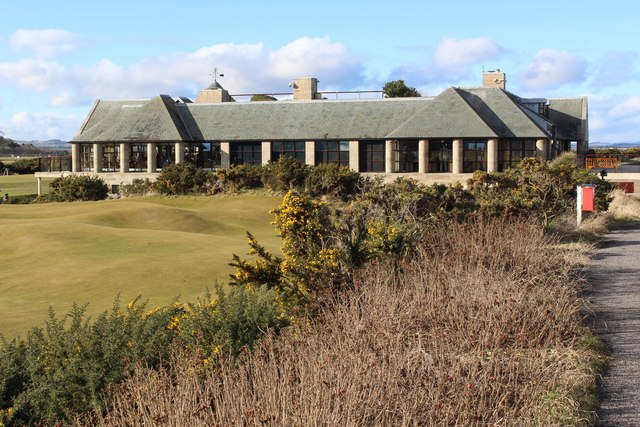
St Andrews Links Clubhouse

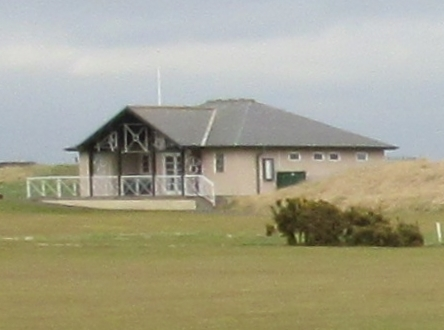
St Andrews Ladies' Putting Club

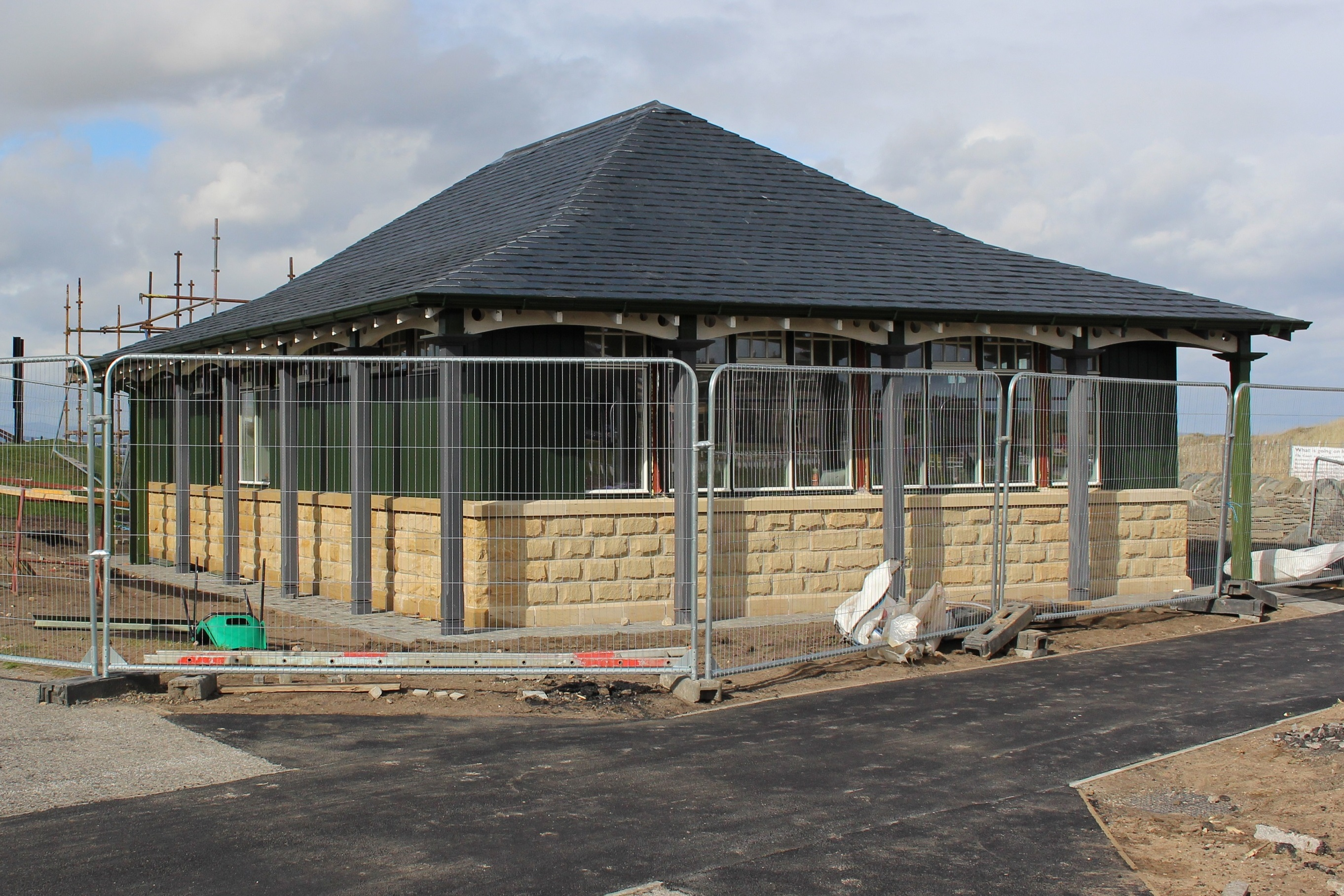
The Caddie Pavilion

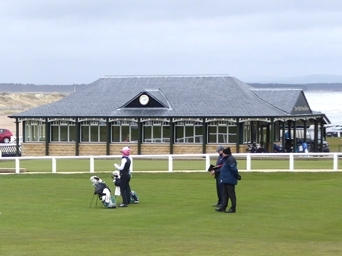
The Old Pavilion

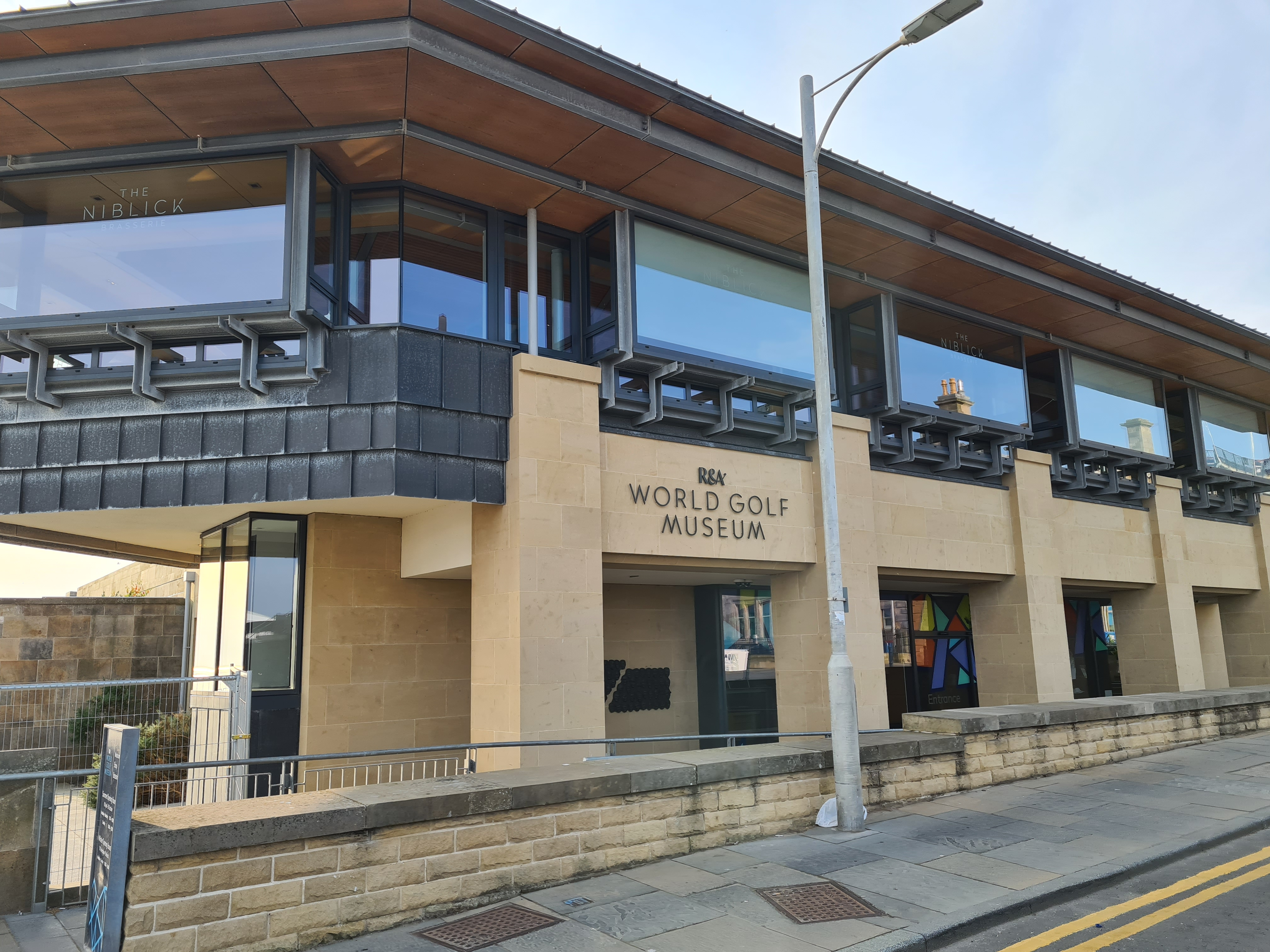
R&A World Golf Museum

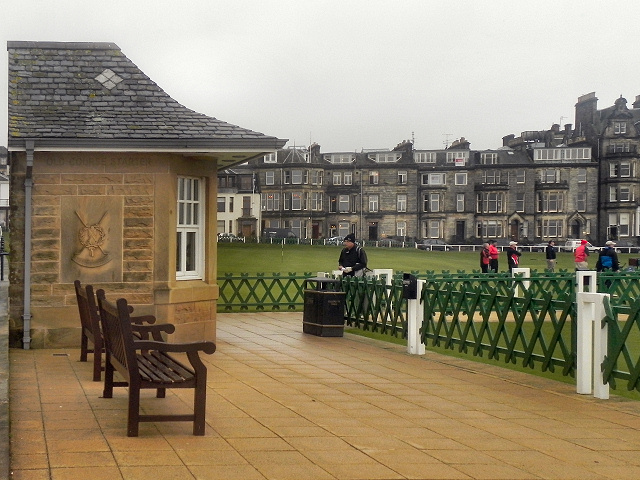
Old Course Starter Hut

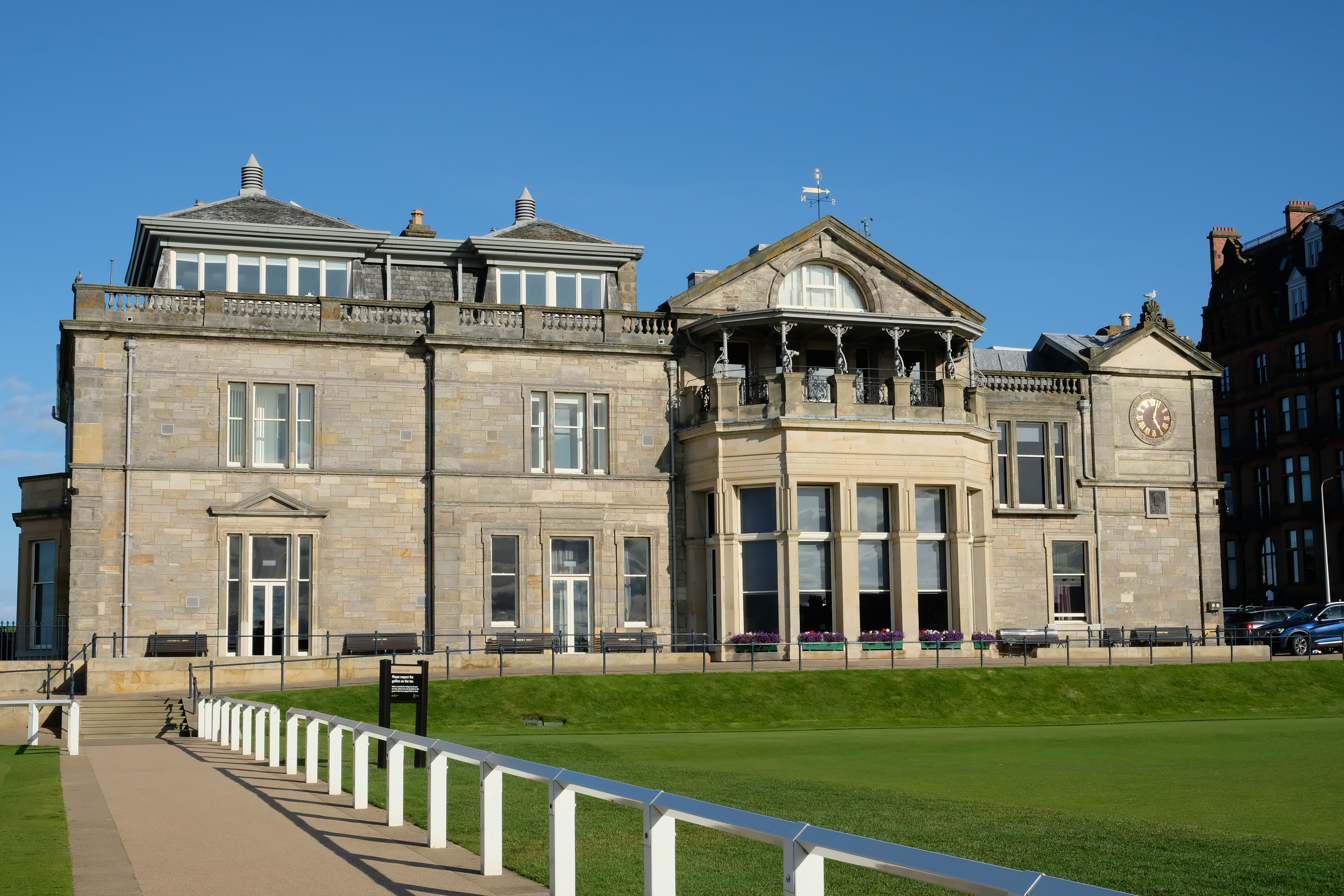
The Royal and Ancient clubhouse

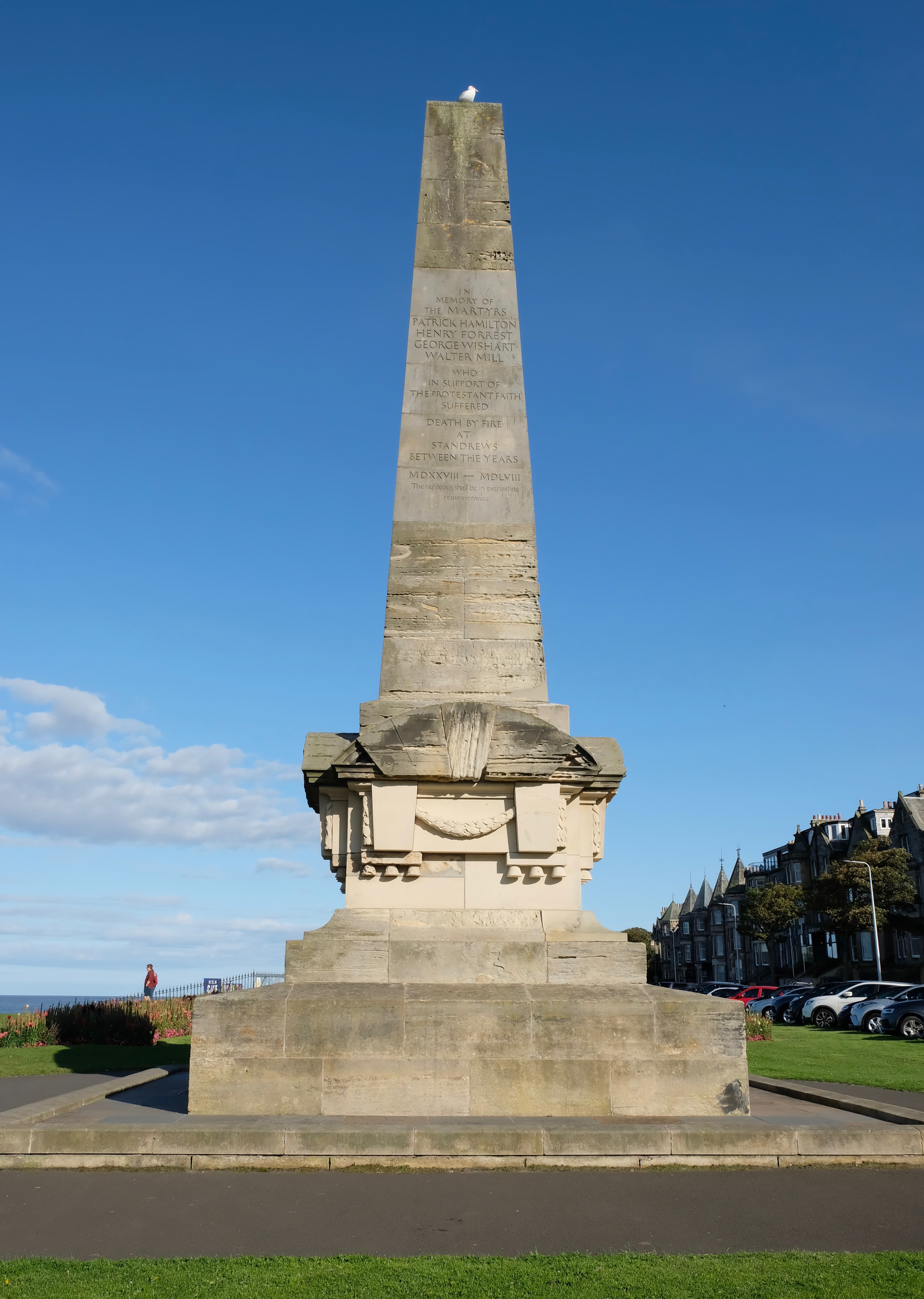
Martyrs' Monument

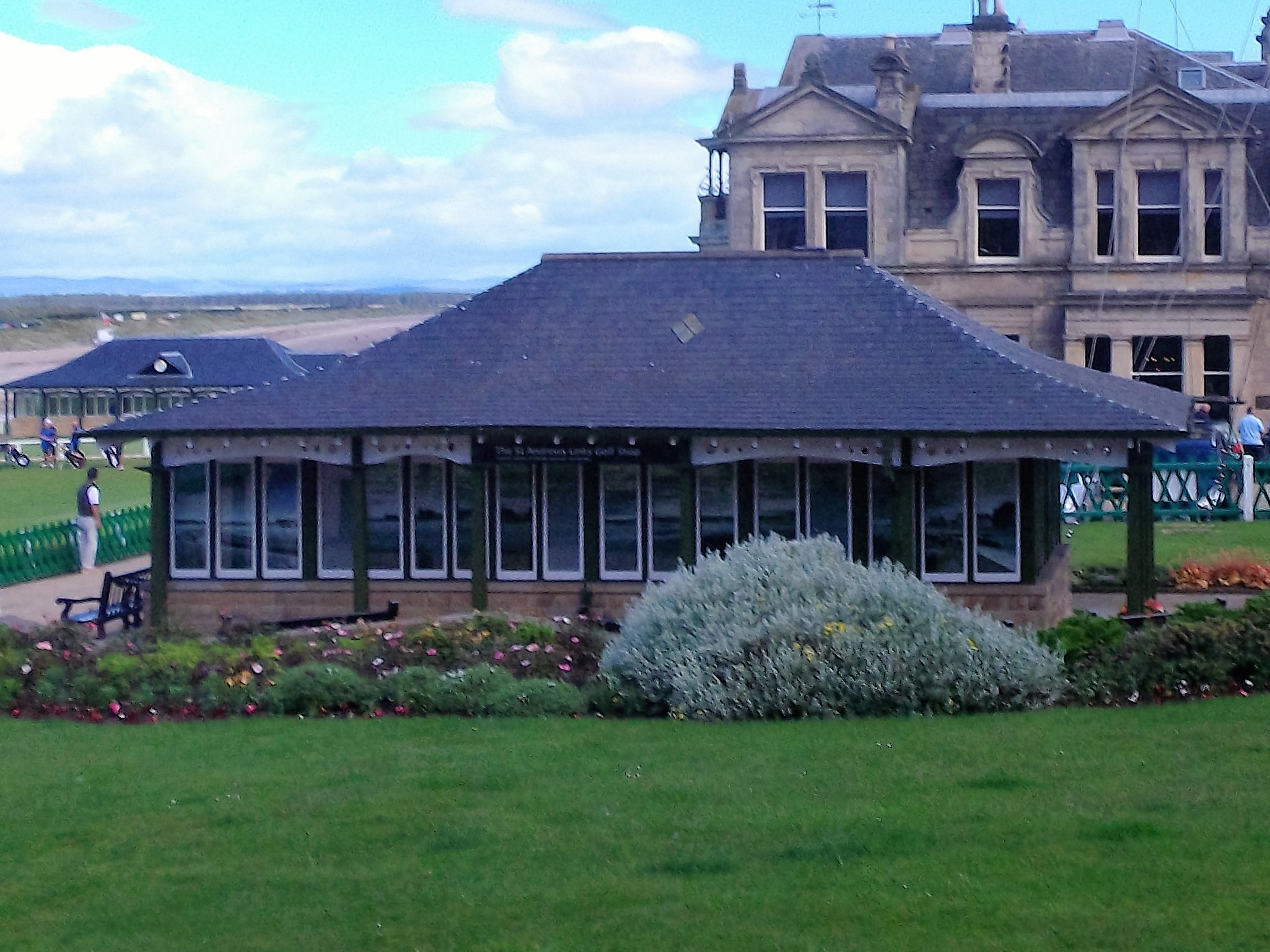
The St Andrews Links Golf Shop

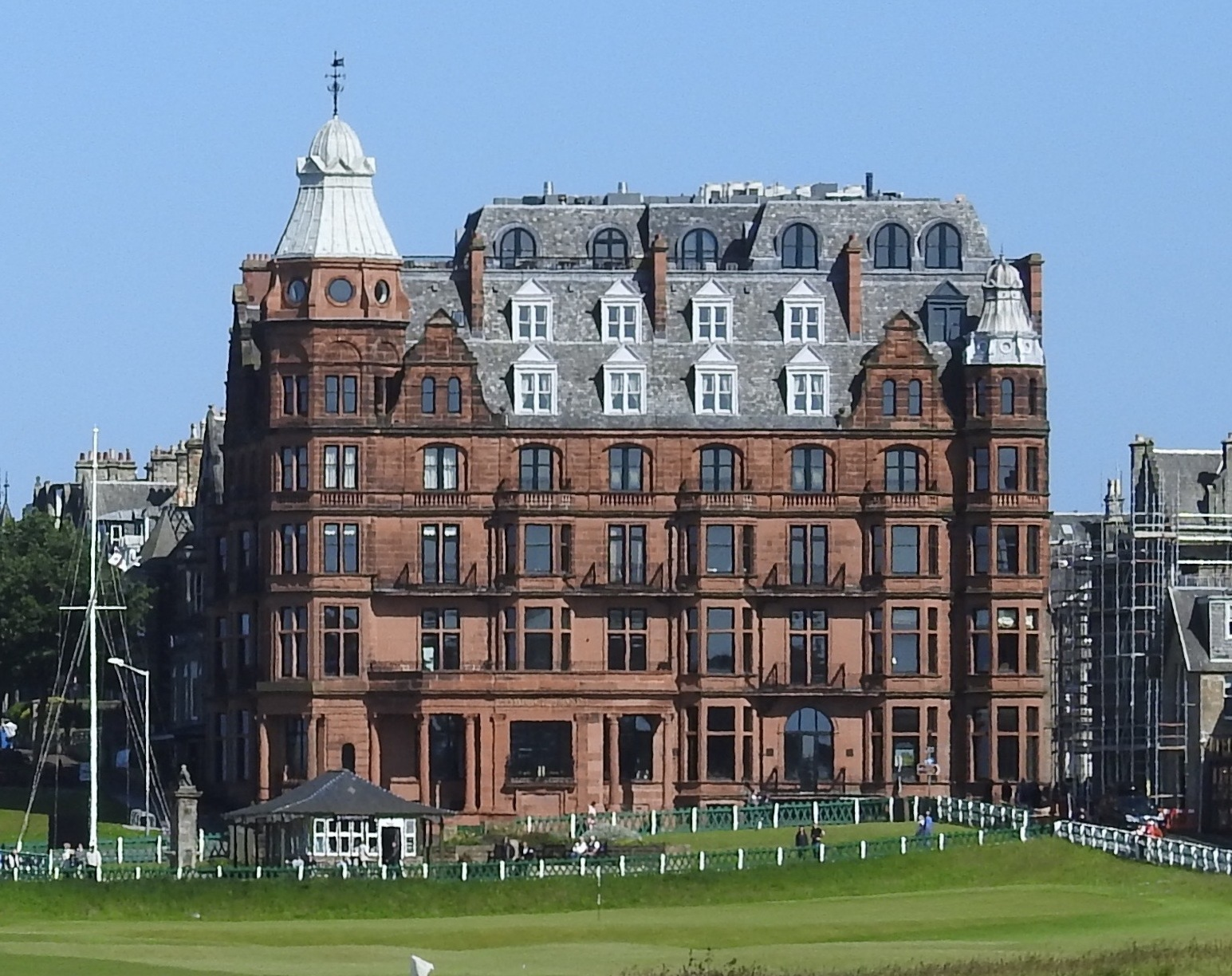
Hamilton Grand

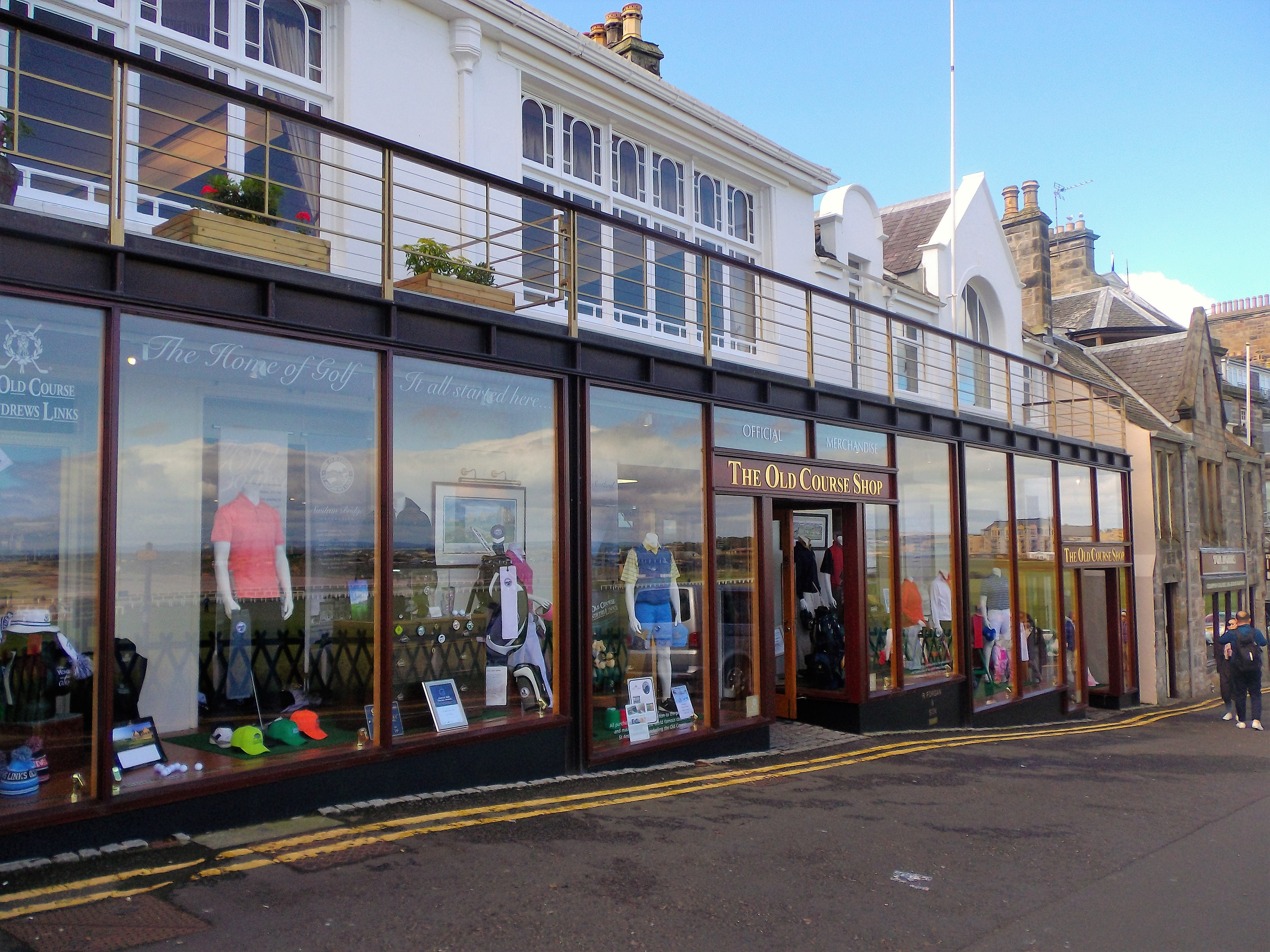
The Old Course Shop, previously the St Andrews Woollen Mill Shop

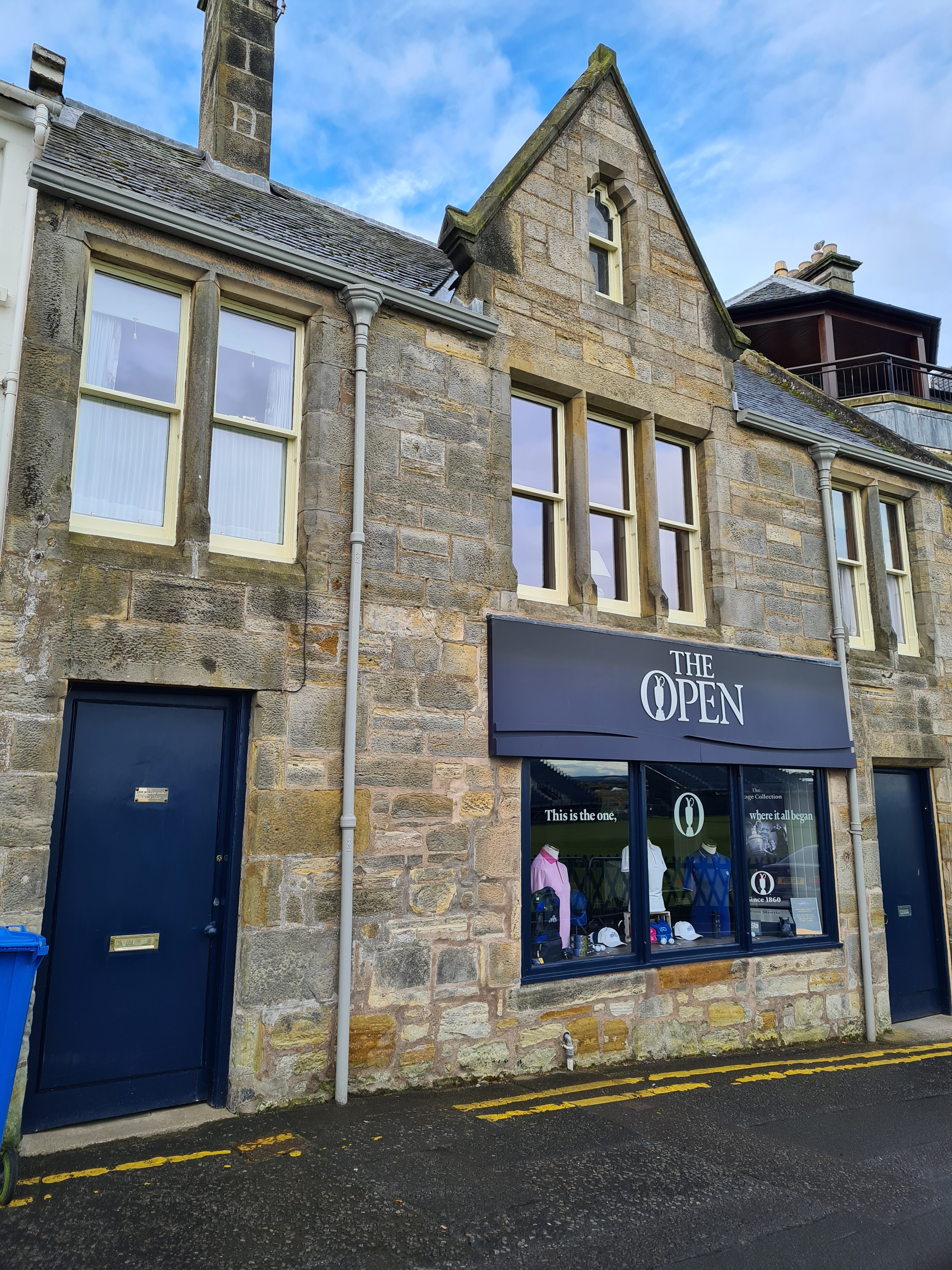
The Open Store, previously known as the Tom Morris Golf Shop

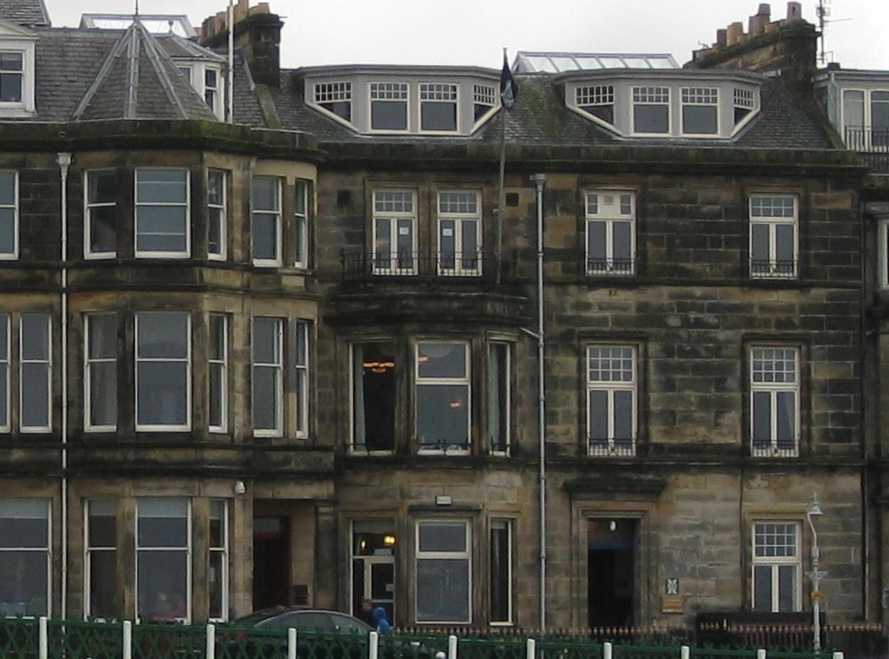
The clubhouses of The St Rule Club (left) and St Andrews Golf Club (right)

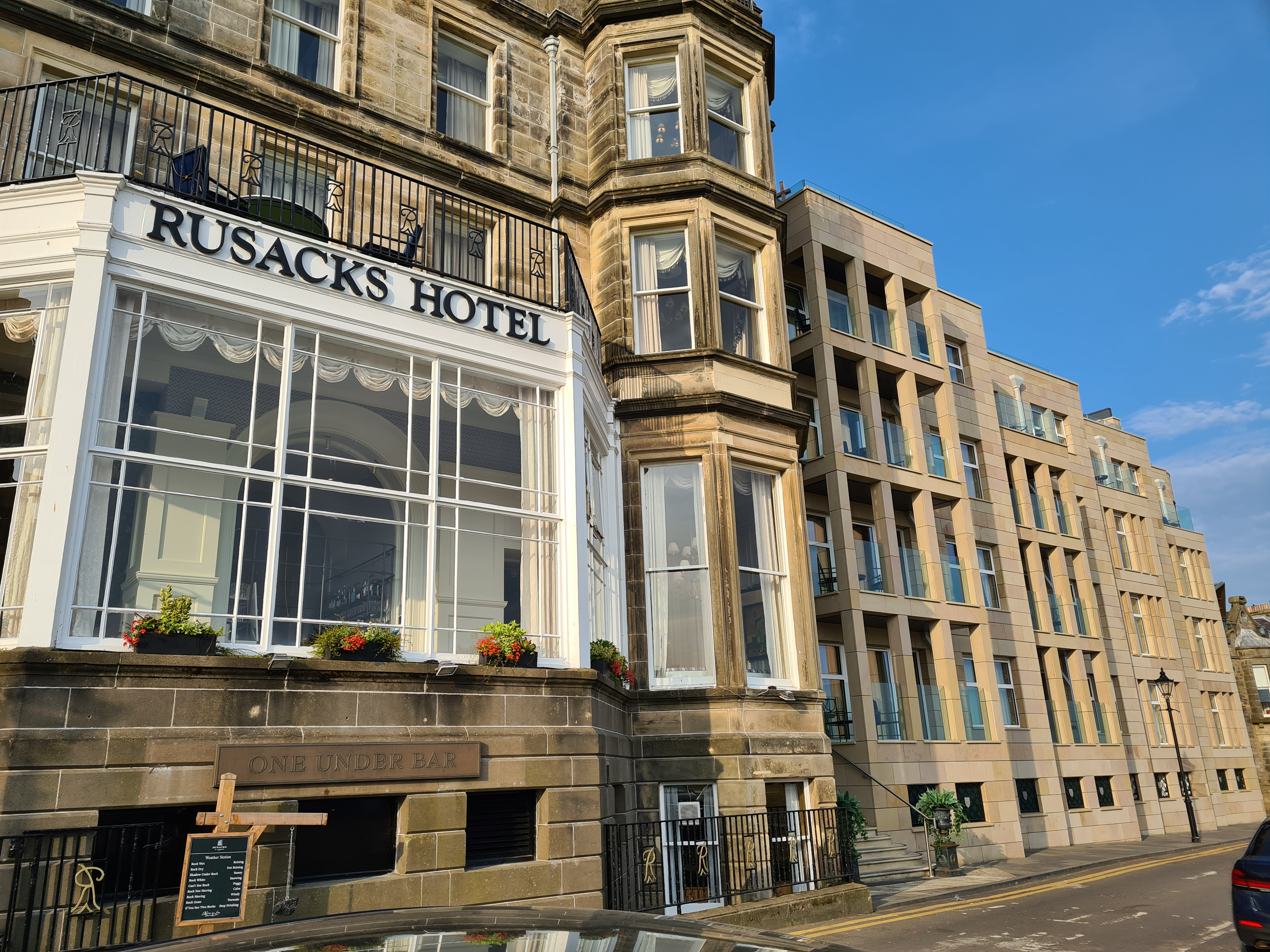
Rusacks Hotel

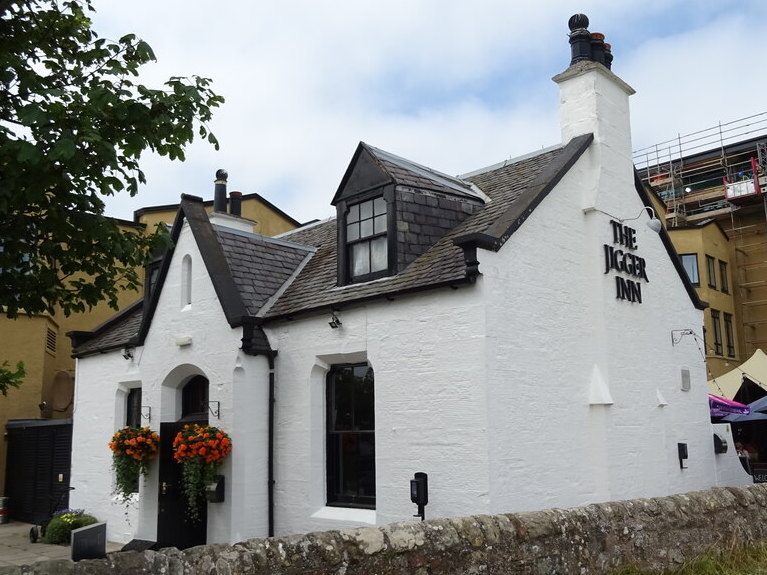
Jigger Inn, previously the St Andrews Links railway station master's cottage.

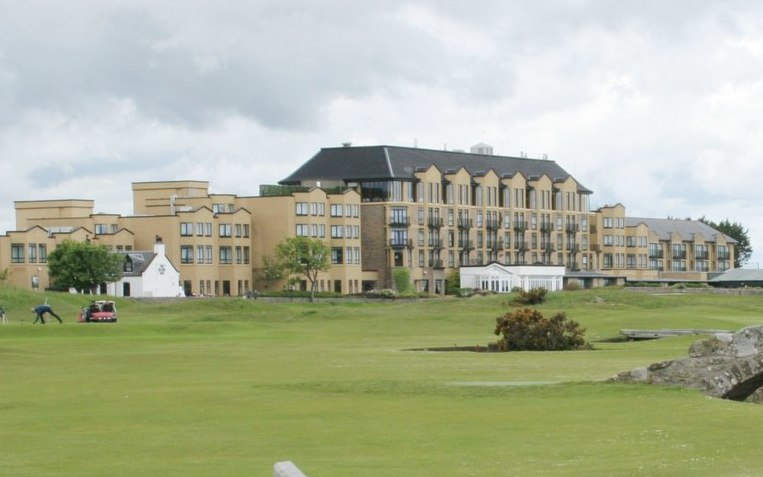
Old Course Hotel

== See also ==
- Golf in Scotland
- St Andrews Links
- The Royal and Ancient Golf Club of St Andrews
