= Tom Morris Golf Shop =

The Open Store
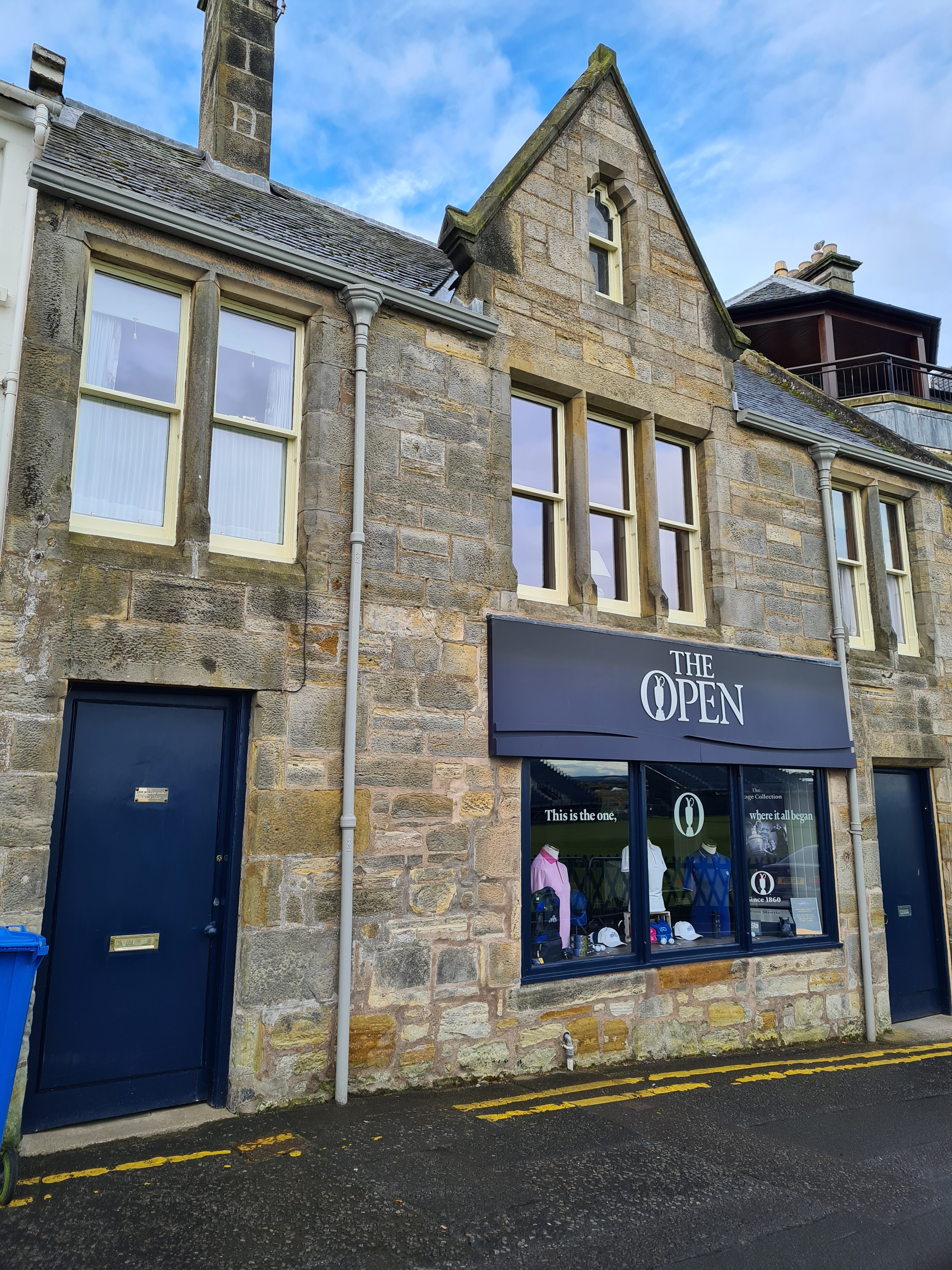
- The Open Store, 8 The Links. 7 The Links (Tom Morris House) is the apartment above the store, with its front door to the left.
- Former names: T. Morris, Tom Morris, Tom Morris Golf Shop

General information
- Type: Shop / Workshop
- Location: 8 The Links (1866-date); 6 Pilmour Links(1866-1908); 8 Golf Place (1864-1866); 15 The Links (1846-1851), St Andrews, Scotland
- Coordinates: 56.342837°N 2.802980°W ,
- Current tenants: Tom Morris Ltd (St Andrews Links Trust)
- Owner: Sheila Walker (7-8 The Links)

Website
- www.tommorris.com

Listed Building – Category A
- Official name: 7 and 8 The Links, Tom Morris House and Golf Shop
- Designated: 23 June 1999; 27 years ago
- Reference no.: LB46273

Tom Morris Golf Shop, also known as the T. Morris, and the Tom Morris shop, and now known as The Open Store is a golf shop located at 8 The Links, in St Andrews, Scotland. The shop overlooks the 18th green of the Old Course at St Andrews, and was the oldest golf shop in the world. By 2010, the Tom Morris Golf Shop had been taken over by the St Andrews Links Trust, and eight years later it had closed, becoming The Open Store instead.

== History ==
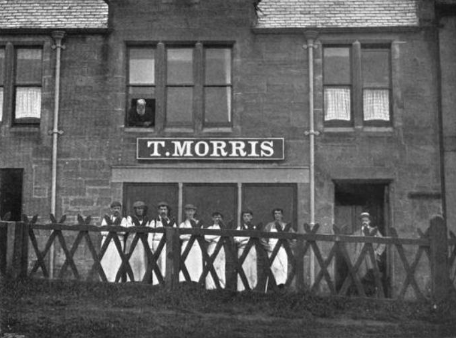
T Morris shop circa 1890. Morris is looking out the second storey window.

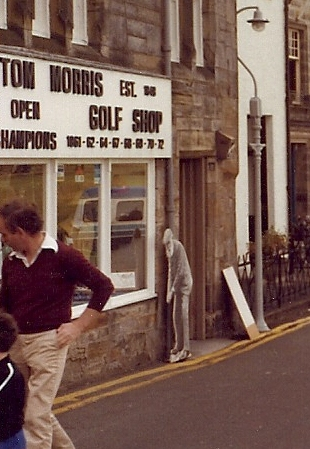
Tom Morris Golf Shop in 1992

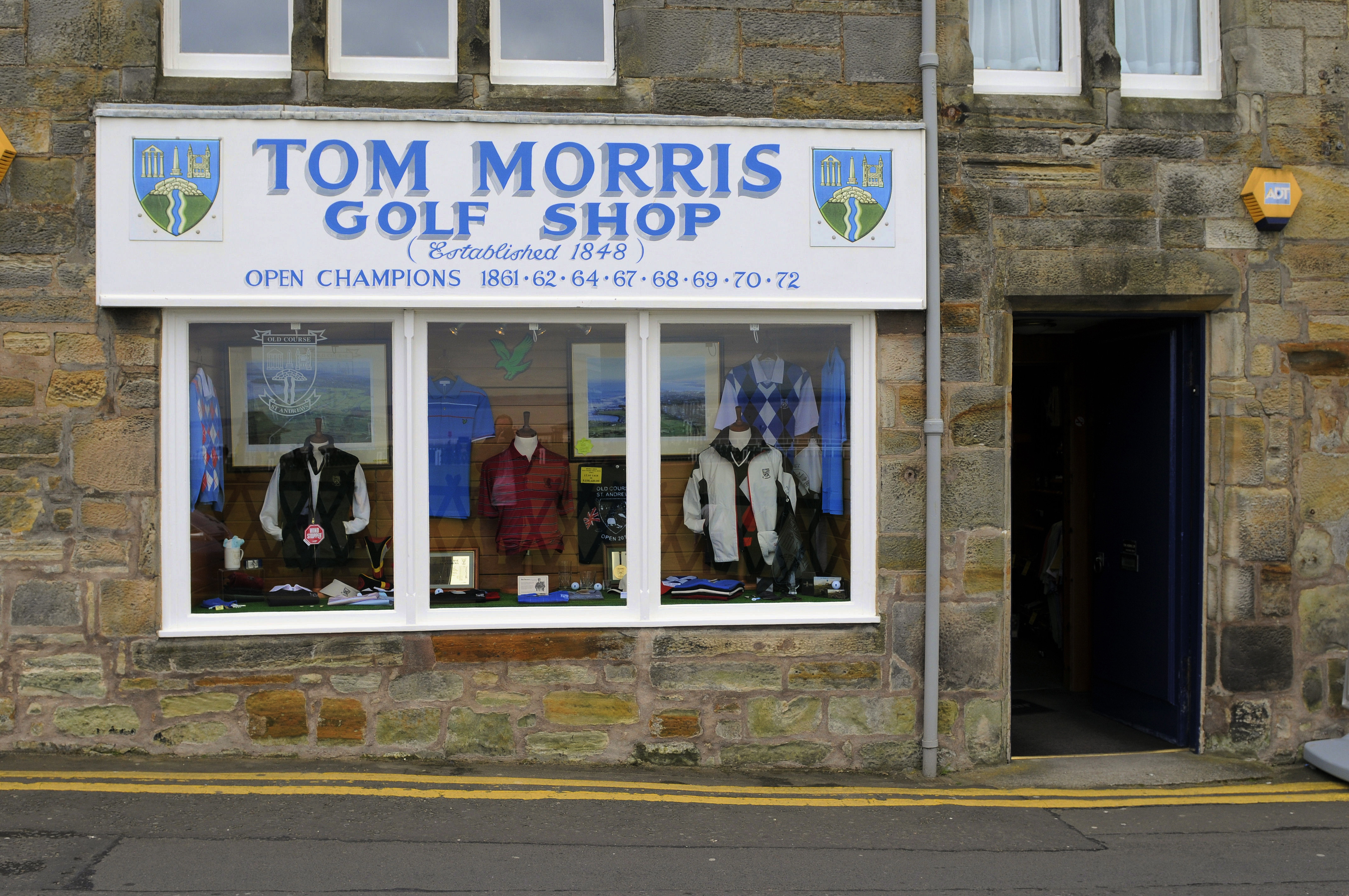
Tom Morris Golf Shop in 2009

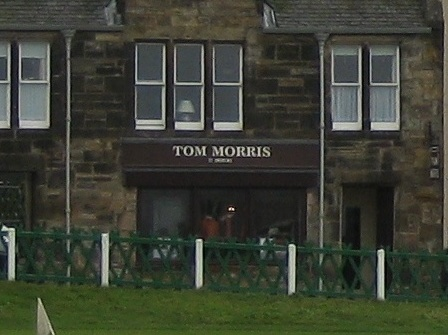
Tom Morris shop in 2013

In 1835 when Old Tom Morris was 14, he became apprentice to Allan Robertson, who was the pro at St Andrews Links, working in his master's St Andrews workshop, producing golf balls and clubs. A contract was signed for 9 years, with 4 years as an apprentice, and 5 as a journeyman.

When Robertson found out that Morris had played with the newly introduced gutta-percha ball in 1846, Robinson instantly sacked him. In 1848, having left his job with Robertson, Morris opened his own business making golf equipment, with his first golf shop at 15 The Links, St Andrews which he ran until 1851 when he accepted a position with Prestwick Golf Club as the first Keeper of the Green. When Morris returned from Prestwick to St Andrews in 1864 as the Keeper of the Green, and he remained in this job until 1903. and at the same time he started his second golf shop, when he took over a small shop and house at 8 Golf Place until 1866. He then moved again, this time into 6 Pilmour Links, and also took over George Daniel Brown's golf shop at 8 The Links. This is the golf shop that was known as the Tom Morris Golf Shop. Morris lived in at 7 The Links, which is a flat above the shop.

The St Andrews Links Trust took over the Tom Morris Shop and Tom Morris Ltd in 2010, Sheila Walker, the great-granddaughter of Old Tom Morris, still owns the property and lives above the shop. The shop was refurbished in 2011 by the St Andrews Links Trust. In 2018 The R&A entered into a partnership with St Andrews Links Trust to manage its retail and merchandise operations. The result of this was that the Tom Morris Shop closed and was replaced by The Open Store.
