= Rand, Texas =

- Unincorporated community
- Location within Texas Location within the United States
- Coordinates: 32°32′20″N 96°10′35″W
- Country: United States
- State: Texas
- County: Kaufman
- Elevation: 459 ft (140 m)
- Time zone: UTC-6 (Central (CST))
  - Summer (DST): UTC-5 (CDT)
- GNIS feature ID: 1378930

Rand is an unincorporated community in Kaufman County, located in the U.S. state of Texas.
