= Royal North Devon Golf Club =

Golf club in Devon, England

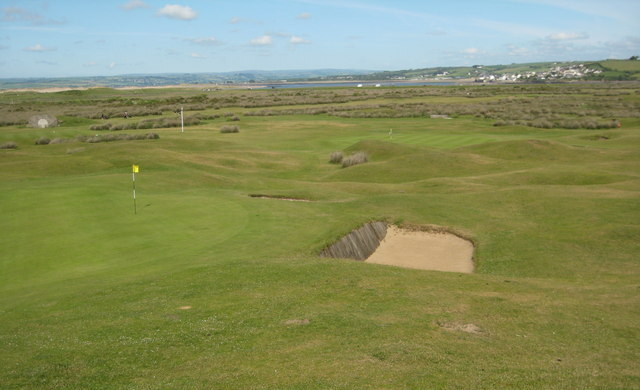
- View across RND in 2009, located on the Northam Burrows SSSI

- Location within Devon
- 51°2′45.6″N 4°13′33.6″W

Club information
- Location: Golf Links Road, Westward Ho!, Devon, EX39 1HD
- Established: 4 April 1864; 162 years ago
- Type: Private links course
- Total holes: 18
- Tournaments: The Amateur Championship (1912, 1925, 1931)
- Greens: Agrostis
- Fairways: Festuca
- Website: www.royalnorthdevongolfclub.co.uk

Championship Course
- Designed by: Old Tom Morris
- Par: 72
- Length: 7,085 yards (6,479 m)
- Course rating: 74.2
- Slope rating: 135
- Course record: 64; (England) Jon White (2007)

Northam Burrows
- Site of Special Scientific Interest
- Location within Devon
- Area of search: Devon
- Grid reference: SS441309
- Interest: Geological
- Area: 421.9 ha (1.629 mi^{2})
- Notification date: 29 June 1988; 38 years ago

The Royal North Devon Golf Club (RND) is a private golf club in Westward Ho!, Devon, England. Founded in 1864 as the North Devon and West of England Golf Club, RND operates the oldest golf course in England. It was granted royal status by King Edward VII—then Prince of Wales—in 1867.

Located on the Northam Burrows SSSI, the links course was designed by Scottish golfer Old Tom Morris. It has been noted for its natural beauty, diverse wildlife, and related conservation schemes. The 18-hole Championship Course provides a challenging experience for golfers, who face trade winds from the Atlantic and a high slope rating.

RND hosted the Amateur Championship in 1912, 1925, and 1931. Notable former members include five-time Open champion John Henry Taylor and two-time British Amateur champion Horace Hutchinson. It placed ninety-fourth in Golf Monthly's rankings of British and Irish courses in 2025.

== History ==
=== Background (1603–1863) ===
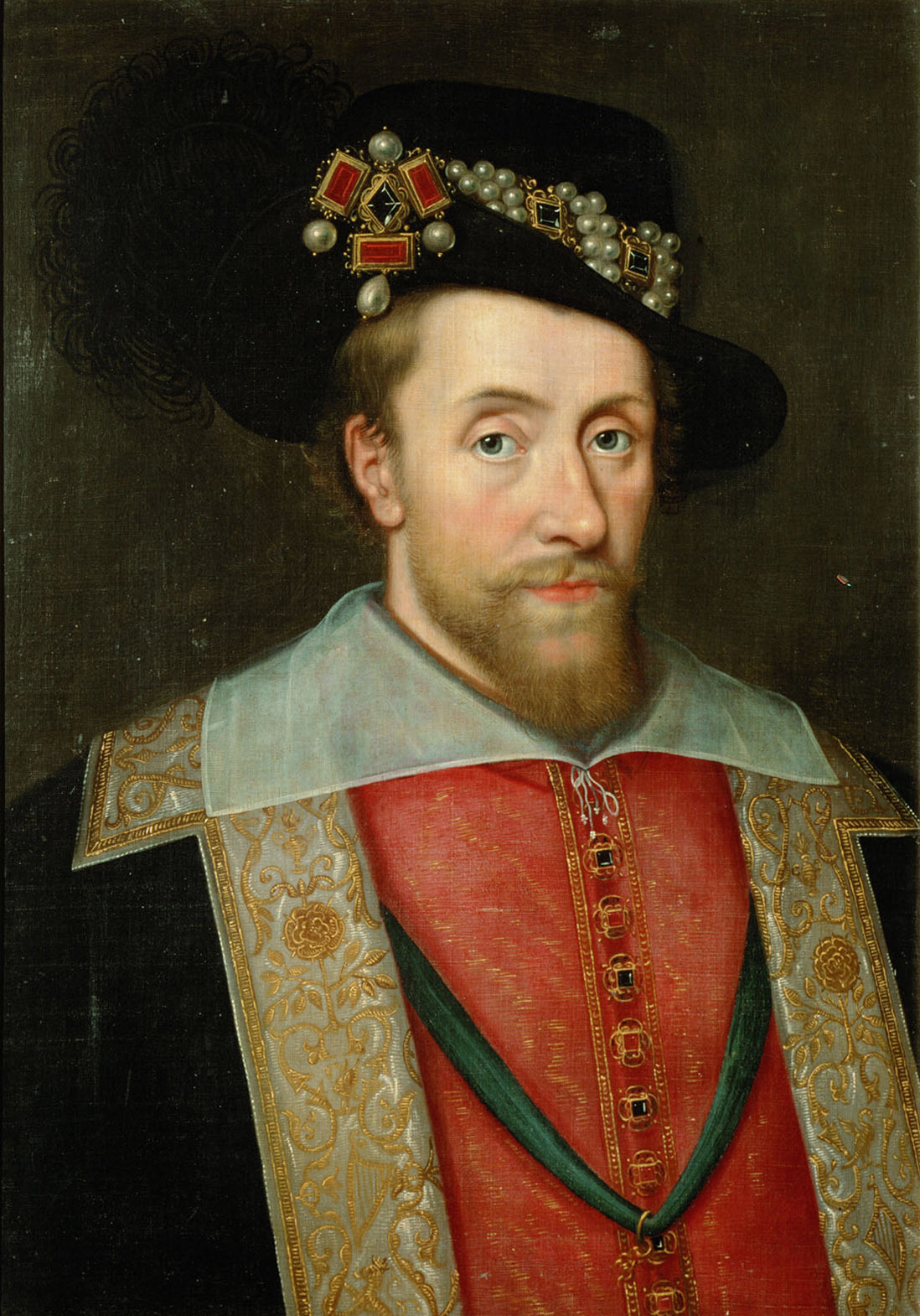
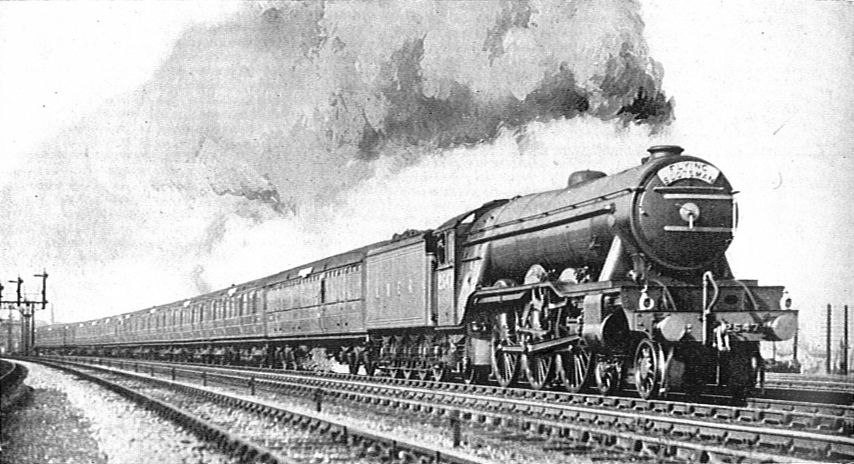
James VI of Scotland has been credited with the expansion of golf following his accession to the English throne.

Following the accession of King James VI of Scotland to the English throne in 1603, the sport of golf spread across the British Isles. His son—Henry Frederick, Prince of Wales—and his courtiers played golf at Blackheath, London, where Royal Blackheath was formally established in 1608. It was not until the mid-19th century that golf gained prominence outside of Scotland. Queen Victoria built Balmoral Castle in the Scottish Highlands in 1852, when the railways expanded to St Andrews. The royal enthusiasm for Scotland, improved transport links, and writings of Walter Scott caused an increase in tourism in Scotland, as well as international interest in its culture.

=== Establishment and royal status (1864–1867) ===
The North Devon and West of England Golf Club was founded in 1864, making it the oldest existing golf course in England. The links course was designed by Scottish golfer Old Tom Morris. It was granted royal status by Edward, Prince of Wales, in 1867, affixing the "Royal" prefix to the club name.

=== First century, J.H. Taylor, and the Amateur (1868–1963) ===
Three leading British golfers of the late 19th and early 20th were known as the Great Triumvirate. One of them, J.H. Taylor, learned his golf at RND and was invested Honorary President of the Club in 1957. RND was also the home course for the noted amateur golfer Horace Hutchinson, who won the British Amateur in 1886 and 1887. The course has hosted The Amateur Championship on three occasions, in 1912, 1925, and 1931.

=== Modern developments (1964–present) ===
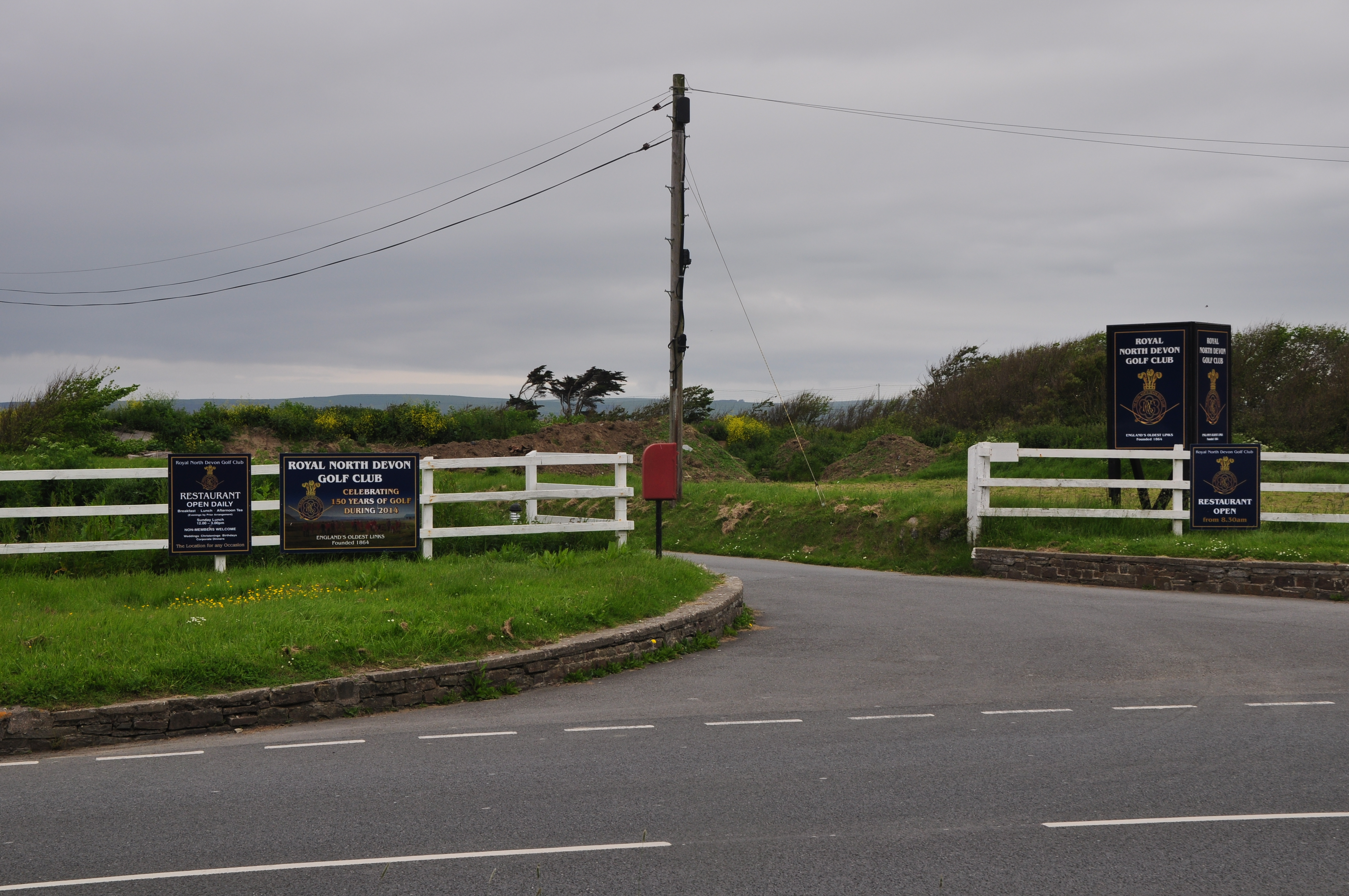
The entrance of RND in 2014, the 150th anniversary of the club's founding.

The club provides facilities for one of the largest junior sections in England.

== Geography ==
=== Flora and fauna ===
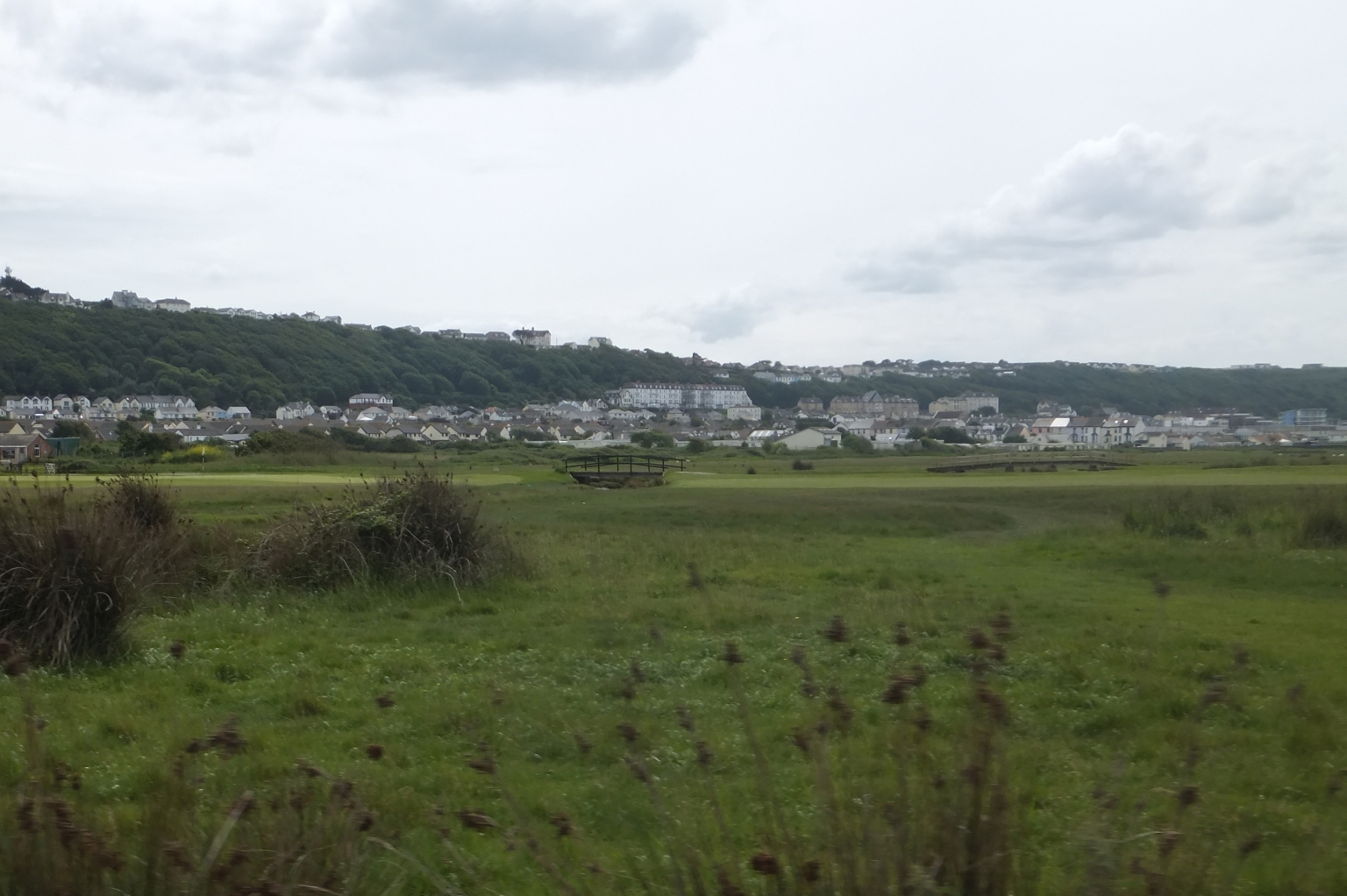
RND is situated on a Site of Special Scientific Interest, featuring diverse flora and fauna along the Atlantic coastline.

RND is located on Northam Burrows between Northam and Westward Ho! Northam Burrows is common land and was notified as a Site of Special Scientific Interest in 1988. Golfers share the environment with sheep, ponies and walkers.

=== Climate ===
In January 2018 part of the seventh green was washed away during Storm Eleanor and there is disagreement between the golf club and Natural England on the management of the coast. There are no plans by Natural England to build coast defences here and point out that the golf club can build two new greens elsewhere and relinquish two existing greens.

=== Conservation ===
The club was the first to ban plastic tees over fears that they were being eaten by wildlife.

== See also ==
- List of golf clubs granted royal status
- List of golf courses designed by Old Tom Morris
- List of golf courses in the United Kingdom
- List of Sites of Special Scientific Interest in Devon
