= National Rally for Democracy =

National Rally for Democracy may refer to:

- National Rally for Democracy (Algeria)
- National Rally for Democracy (Mali)
- National Democratic Rally (Senegal)
- National Rally for Democracy (Benin)
