= Rand (given name) =

Rand is a given name. Notable people with the name include:

- Rand Araskog (1931–2021), American businessman
- Rand Beers (born 1942), American politician
- Rand Brooks (1918–2003), American film actor
- Rand Chappell, American basketball coach
- Rand Dyck (born 1943), Canadian political scientist
- Rand Holmes (1942–2002), Canadian artist
- Rand Hummel (born 1956), American preacher and author
- Rand Miller (born 1959), American video game designer
- Rand Paul (born 1963), American politician and ophthalmologist
- Rand Ravich, American screenwriter and producer
- Rand Schrader (1945–1993), American activist and judge
- Rand Steiger (born 1957), American composer, conductor, and pedagogue

Fictional characters:

- Rand al'Thor, the main character in Robert Jordan's The Wheel of Time fantasy fiction series
