= St Andrews Ladies' Putting Club =

Golf club in St Andrews, Fife, Scotland

St Andrews Ladies’ Putting Club
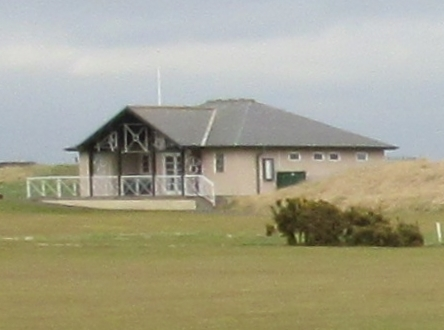
- The clubhouse of the St Andrews Ladies’ Putting Club

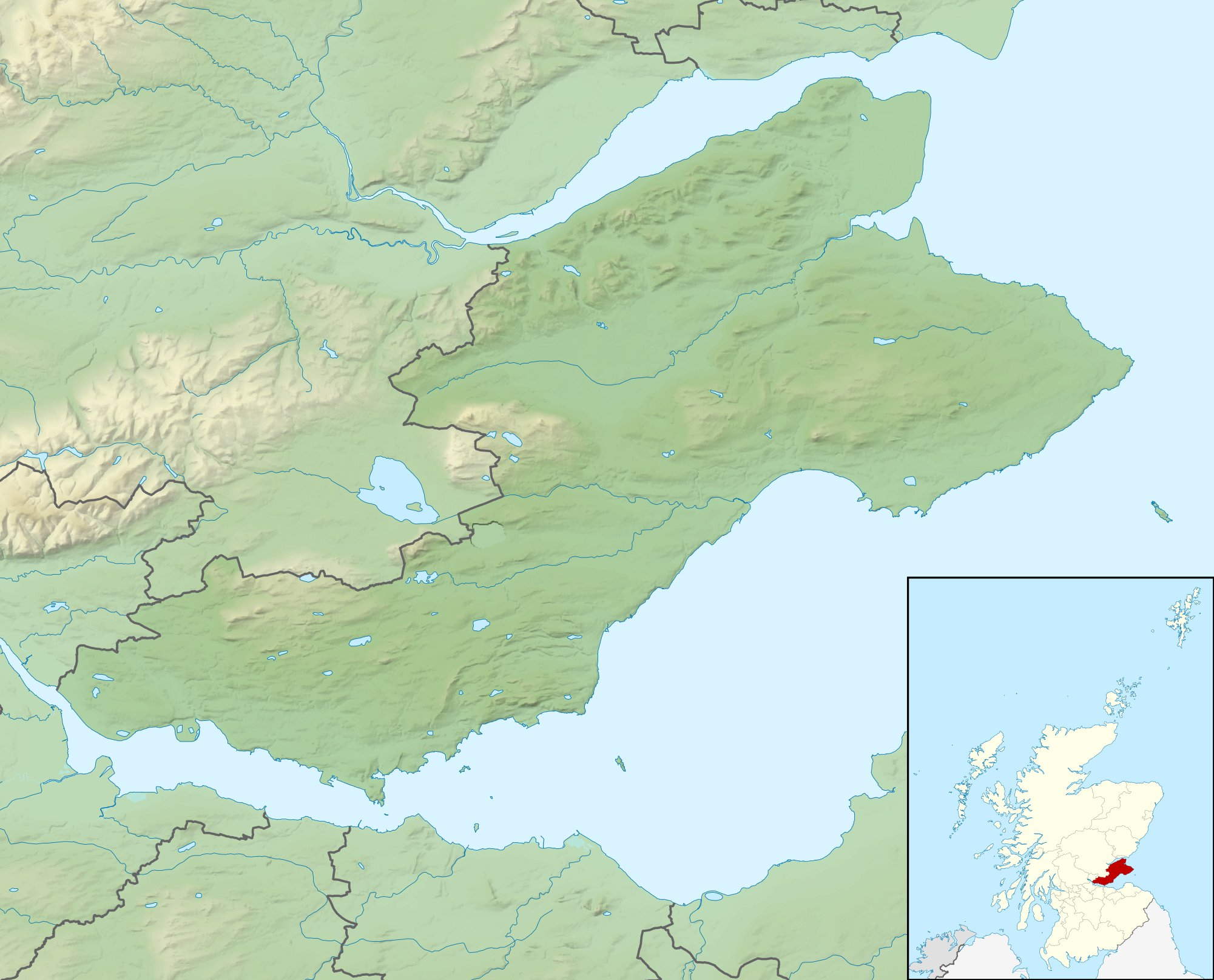
- Location within Fife
- 56.3447°N 2.8071°W

Club information
- Location: The Links, St Andrews, Fife, Scotland.
- Established: 1867 (159 years ago)
- Type: Private club. Public putting courses (9-hole and 18 hole)
- Owner: St Andrews Ladies’ Putting Club
- Tota holes: 27
- Website: standrewsputtingclub.com

Ladies’ Putting Green (The Himalayas)
- Designed by: Old Tom Morris
- Length: 9 and 18 holes
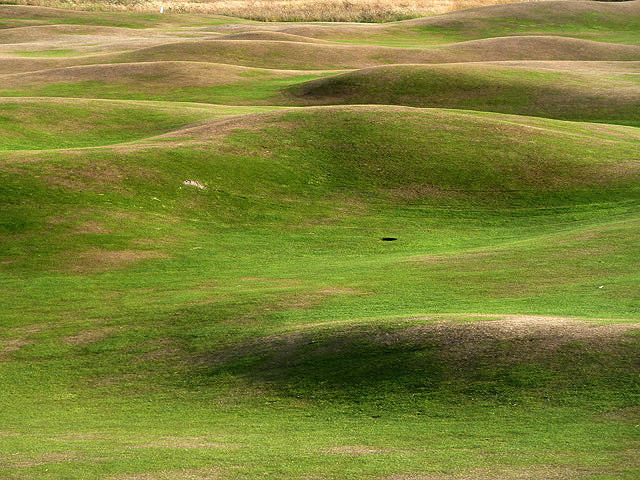
- The undulating putting course of The Himalayas

St Andrews Ladies’ Putting Club, originally known as the St Andrews Ladies Golf Club when it was first established in 1867 for female golf players to use, now the club is also known as the Ladies’ Putting Club of St Andrews, or simply the Putting Club. The club is still a ladies only golf club based in St Andrews, Fife, Scotland. It is generally known to visitors as The Himalayas putting course, which is where the club's members and visitors play, and is thought to be the first minigolf course ever made. The Himalayas name comes about from the peaks and troughs on the course. It has both 9 and 18-hole courses, and is open to men, women and children (6 years of age and above) visitors alike for a nominal fee. The club is the world’s oldest ladies’ golf club.

== History ==
Old Tom Morris and the St Andrews Ladies’ Putting Club

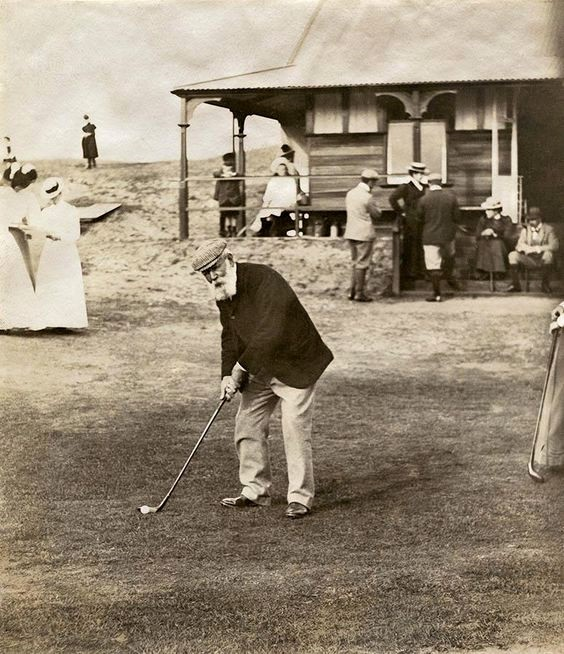
Old Tom Morris in front of the clubhouse

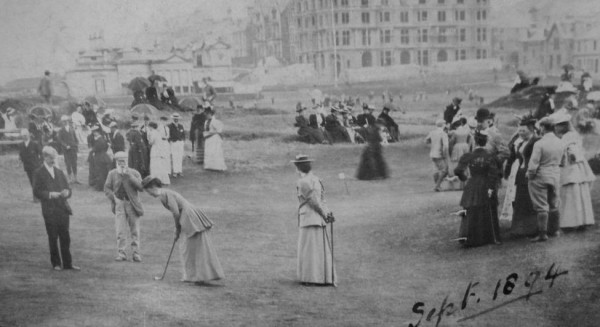
St Andrews Ladies’ Putting Club with Old Tom Morris (2nd left)

Before 1860, there were few recreational activities that young women could participate in, apart from croquet, battledore and shuttlecock, and archery. At that time, the caddies of St Andrews laid out a small putting area on the Links behind Gibson Place, which is close to the present-day Rusacks Hotel. The club originated as a group of local St Andrews ladies that included Miss Ellen Boothby, her sister-in-law Mrs Robert Todd Boothby, Mrs Skipworth, Miss Deane and Miss Chambers, who met regularly on the putting green. Many of the ladies’ fathers or brothers were members of the Royal and Ancient Golf Club, and the ladies would play on the Old Course when it was quiet. There had been growing friction between the ladies and the caddies, who believed that the ladies were taking over their space on the links. Consequently, by 1866 the ladies felt that they should have their own links and club, and so in 1867 the St Andrews Ladies Golf Club was established with Mrs Robert Todd Boothby as President and Miss Ellen Boothby as Vice President.

Old Tom Morris laid out a nine-hole “miniature links” golf course, called the Ladies’ Putting Green also commonly known as The Himalayas. The course is now known as Ladies’ Putting Green (The Himalayas). He was a supporter of the club and the green-keeper for the club until he retired in 1895. He was then made an honorary member of the club. At some point in time, more ground was acquired to the north for the 18-hole putting course. One of the main obstacles on the course is the old fishermen’s path which had been frequently flooded. This path still runs through the putting course but it now has a hard surface and is still referred to as “Jordan”. In 1898, a very basic corrugated iron Clubhouse was erected and by 1999, this was replaced by the current structure.

The Himalayas putting course is run by the St Andrews Ladies' Putting Club, unlike the other seven golf courses on the St Andrews Links, which are run by St Andrews Links Trust. The course was originally laid out by Old Tom Morris as a 9-hole course. Later, more land was acquired and an 18-hole course was established.

== See also ==
- List of golf courses designed by Old Tom Morris
