= Church of St Mary on the Rock =

Ruined church in Fife, Scotland

Coordinates: 56.3398°N 2.7851°W

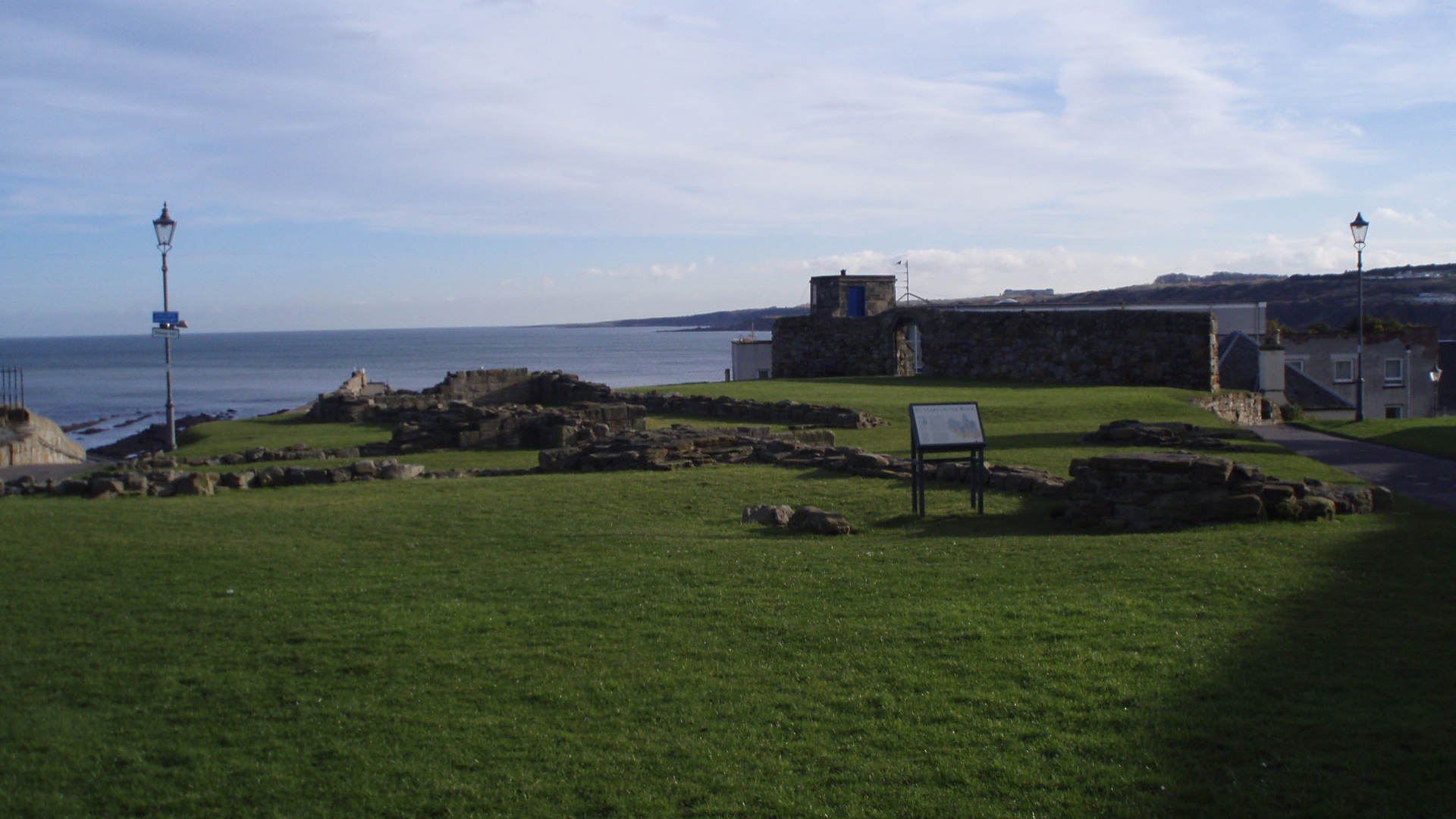
The extant foundations of the church

The Church of St Mary on the Rock, or St Mary's Collegiate Church, was a secular college of priests based on the seaward side of St Andrews Cathedral, St Andrews, just beyond the precinct walls. It is known by a variety of other names, such as St Mary of the Culdees, Kirkheugh and Church of St Mary of Kilrymont.

Although not founded as a collegiate church until the 1240s, Scotland's first, it represented a corporate continuation of the association of clergy known as the Culdees or Céli Dé, "vassals of God". The church lasted for several centuries, but did not long outlast the Scottish Reformation, and today little of the original structure has survived.

== Céli Dé of Cennrighmonaidh ==
St Mary's Collegiate Church has its origins in Kilrymont monastery and its group of canons called "Culdees" or Céli Dé ("Vassals of God"). These priests served a side altar in the Cathedral throughout the twelfth-century and into the thirteenth century. The Céli Dé were headed by an abbot. The only abbot whose name is recorded is Gille Críst, the "abbot of the Céli Dé" recorded 1172 x 1178 feuing out lands to the steward of the Bishop of St Andrews, though an unnamed abbot is recorded again in the 1180s.

Until the foundation of the Augustinian priory in 1140, the Céli Dé and the seven clerics known as the personae (parsons) are the only known clerics of the cathedral. The new Augustinian regular canons were intended to become the main clergymen of the cathedral, serving its main altar, and Pope Eugenius III in 1147 confirmed the rights of the Augustinian canons and their prior to elect the Bishop of St Andrews.

It is likely on a number of grounds that Bishop Robert, an Augustinian himself from Nostell, intended that the Céli Dé would become Augustinians, bringing their property into the new Cathedral Priory. This is not what happened, and although another papal bull of 1147 ordered that upon the death of each Céle Dé an Augustinian should take his place, they were still there in 1199 when the priory recognised their holdings to be permanent.

== Second cathedral chapter ==
Professor G. W. S. Barrow argued that from the episcopates of Roger de Beaumont and William de Malveisin the bishops of St Andrews were promoting the Céli Dé as a second cathedral chapter. Barrow compared this with the attempts of two archbishops of Canterbury, Baldwin and Hubert Walter, to establish a secular college dedicated to St Thomas which would act as a counter to the power of the monks and prior; but Barrow thought a more apt parallel was to be founded in the archbishopric of Dublin.

In 1163, Archbishop Lorcán Ua Tuathail had converted his diocesan canons into the Augustinian Cathedral of the Holy Trinity. John Comyn, the first Anglo-Norman Archbishop of Dublin, created a new collegiate church at St Patricks parish church, a collegiate church his successor Henry de Loundres turned into a second cathedral. In both the Dublin and Canterbury examples, the bishop had to deal with a pre-established monastic cathedral chapter under a prior, and in both cases the bishop sought to subvert the prior and chapter's power in his own interest.

The Céli Dé are found in close association with, in fact allied to, the bishop, from Beaumont's episcopate onwards, and the two frequently occur together in disputes with the prior of St Andrews. For instance, sometime between 1202 and 1216, Bishop William de Malveisin absolved the sentence of excommunication which had been imposed by the prior (obviously as part of a dispute), and again, in 1220, the papal legate "Master James" was commissioned by the Pope Honorius III to resolve a dispute between the Augustinians and their prior with Bishop William and "certain clergy of St Andrews commonly called Céli Dé" (quosdam clericos de S. Andrea, qui Keledei vugariter appellantur).

The Céli Dé were claiming the right to participate in episcopal elections from 1239 onwards, when they participated (at the king's insistence) in the election of David de Bernham.

In 1253, following the death of Bishop David and after the Augustinian chapter had already elected Robert de Stuteville as the new bishop, the Céli Dé and the Archdeacon Abel de Gullane protested to the papacy that the election was invalid, owing to the exclusion of the Céli Dé from the process. Gullane was a papal chaplain, and Pope Innocent IV quashed the election of Robert de Stuteville, appointing Gullane as the new legal bishop. No judgment, however, appears to have been offered on the right of the Céli Dé to voted in capitular elections.

== Collegiate Church ==
For some of the above reasons, it was G. W. S. Barrow's contention that the Gaelic-speaking Céli Dé were gradually replaced by the clerks and personal dependents of the early thirteenth-century bishops, most of whom came from France or England. By 1250, these French or English-speaking Céli Dé had moved to the church of St Mary, and had been granted the status and rights of a secular college, that is, a collegiate church. This had probably happened in either 1248 or 1249, when the Church of St Mary's as a separate institution from the cathedral is mentioned for the first time. This transformation gave St Mary's the honour of being the first collegiate church in the Kingdom of Scotland and the only secular college in the kingdom before the fourteenth century.

The first known provost of the church was Master Adam de Malkarviston, attested on 7 November 1250. There were in addition to the provost, six canons. The new status does not appear to have affected use of the name Céli Dé immediately, as the church is still called "St Marys of the Céli Dé" in 1344. The Church of St Mary became an official royal chapel as early as 1286 x 1296, and remained as such until the erection of the Chapel Royal at Stirling in 1501. It is likely that the deanery of the Chapel Royal from 1429 until 1501 formed a prebend within the Church of St Mary.

A papal privilege dated 26 January 1386, admitted the Provost of St Mary's to the chapter of St Andrews; he became one of the three secular dignitaries of the chapter, along with the diocese's two archeadecons:

Ad perpetuam rei memoriam. At the petition of king Robert, the pope hereby constitutes as a secular dignity with cure of the cathedral of St Andrews, that dignity of the Chapel Royal of St Andrews, immediately subject to the Apostolic See, which is commonly known as the provostship of St Andrews, assigning to the provost and his successors a stall in the choir and a place in the chapter, with a voice in the election of the bishop, or of any other office, and in all capitular acts and negotiations, and the said provost nevertheless remaining subject to the bishop, who has the power to correct him, and if necessary even deprive him of office. Although in the cathedral there are no dignities, there are two archdeaconries which are reckoned as dignities, and the seculars holding them have stalls in the choir and places in the chapter, with a voice in all capitular matters. Avignon, 9 Kal. Feb., anno 9.

In the 1440s, the Chancellor of the Church of St Mary was added to the chapter of the cathedral (1447 x 1449), but this lasted less than two decades, being dissolved between 1461 and 1462.

== Endowments ==
The exact number of the church's prebends through the course of history is unclear, but in the time of Bishop Henry Wardlaw there were eight prebends. These were probably "Cairns and Cameron", "Kinglassie and Kingask", Lambieletham, "Durie and Rumgally", Kinkell, Kinaldy, Fetteresso, and Strathbrock. The Céli Dé held Lambieletham since the twelfth-century when they obtained it in exchange for Strathkinness; according to the sixteenth-century Book of Assumptions the Provost of St Mary's held the lands of Kinkell, lands under the control of the Céli Dé in the 1170s.

Most of the others too were probably ancient Céli Dé, though Fetteresso and Strathbrock were not, being endowed to the college by Bishop Henry Wardlaw in 1425 and 1435 x 1436 respectively. Arbuthnott (before 1447), Ballingry (before 1461), Benholm (before 1477) and Dysart (1477) were added later in the fifteenth century, and Idvies (before 1547) was added in the sixteenth. Another may have been created during the time of Archbishop Andrew Forman (abp 1514–1521). There were allegedly thirteen prebends at the time of the Reformation.

== Location and building ==
The church is located at Kirkheugh or Kirkhill. This location, where the modern North Street and South Street converge, may have been the original location of the religious site before the construction of a new cathedral building slightly to the west (the remains of which constitute St Rule's Tower) by Robert, Bishop of St Andrews. There are burials in the vicinity of Kirkheugh that pre-date the alleged eighth-century foundation of the monastery, and point to a small religious community from the sixth-century. There were also a number of tenth-century cross-slabs found in the grounds. The church was said by John Lesley to have been pulled down by reforming Protestants in June 1559.

The extant foundations of the church show that it was cross-shaped, and possessed no aisle. The length of the transepts cannot be determined, but the choir was longer than the nave. The nave seems to represent the earliest of the three detectable building phases. The altar lay at the eastern end of the choir. The sedilia on the southern wall is lost, as are the sacristy and the accommodation for the canons and the provost.

== Leaders of the religious house ==
=== List of known provosts ===
- Adam de Makerstoun, x 1250–1280 x 1287
- William Comyn, 1287–1329
  - John Benstede, 1298
  - William de Rasen, 1309
- John de Roxburgh, 1329 x 1342-1342 x 1363
- Gilbert Armstrong, 1362 x 1363–1373 x 1376
- William de Dalgarnoch, 1376-1376 x 1377
- Duncan Petit, 1376 x 1381–1397 x 1398
- Robert de Lany, 1397 x 1405–1432 x 1437
- Hugh Kennedy, 1437–1454
- John Kennedy, 1454 x 1456–1472 x 1477
- William Scherar, 1472 x 1477-1477 x 1480
- James Allardice, 1477 x 1480–1506 x 1507
- James Kincragy, 1506 x 1508–1539 x 1540
- James Lermont, 1540–1578
  - Patrick Bellenden, 1554
- Thomas Buchanan, 1578–1599
- Robert Buchanan, 1599–1618
- Possession of the Archbishop of St Andrews in 1625

== See also ==
- St Nicholas Hospital, St Andrews
