= Kinkell =

Kinkell may refer to:

- Kinkell, Fife, a castle and location near to St Andrews, Scotland
- Kinkell, Aberdeenshire, a parish in Aberdeenshire, Scotland
- Bishop Kinkell, a small scattered crofting hamlet in Inverness-shire, Scottish Highlands
- Easter Kinkell, a rural village, in the parish of Urquhart and Logie Wester, in the county of Ross-shire
- Newton of Kinkell, a scattered crofting township, in Dingwall, Black Isle, Ross-shire, Scottish Highlands
