= St Nicholas Hospital =

St Nicholas Hospital may refer to:

- Hospital of St Nicholas, Nantwich, medieval hospice in Cheshire, England
- St Nicholas Hospital, Newcastle upon Tyne, modern psychiatric hospital in England
- St Nicholas Hospital, St Andrews, medieval leper hospital in Scotland
- St. Nicholas Hospital, Lagos, in Nigeria
