= New Picture House =

Cinema in St Andrews, Scotland

The New Picture House
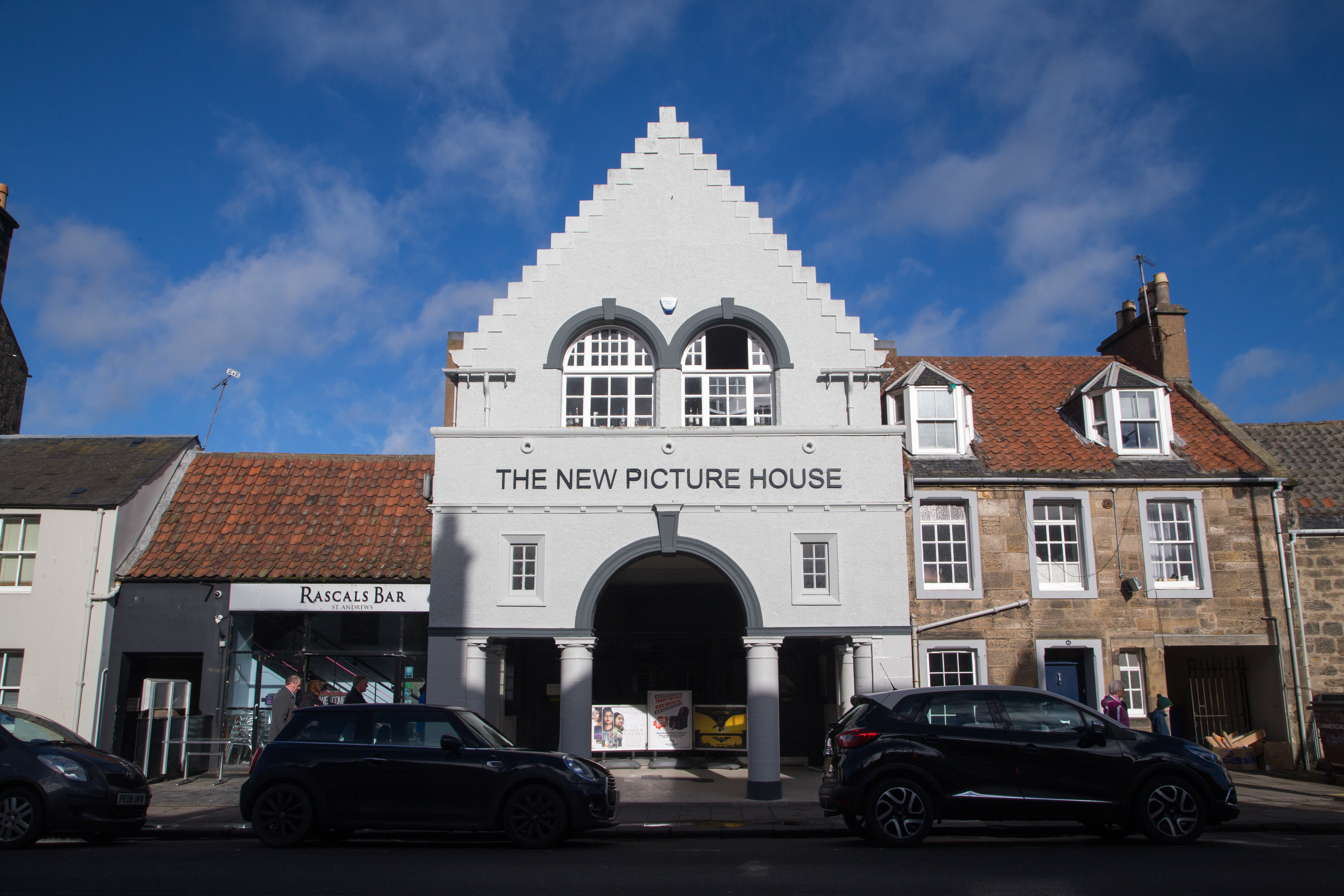
- Southern elevation of The New Picture House

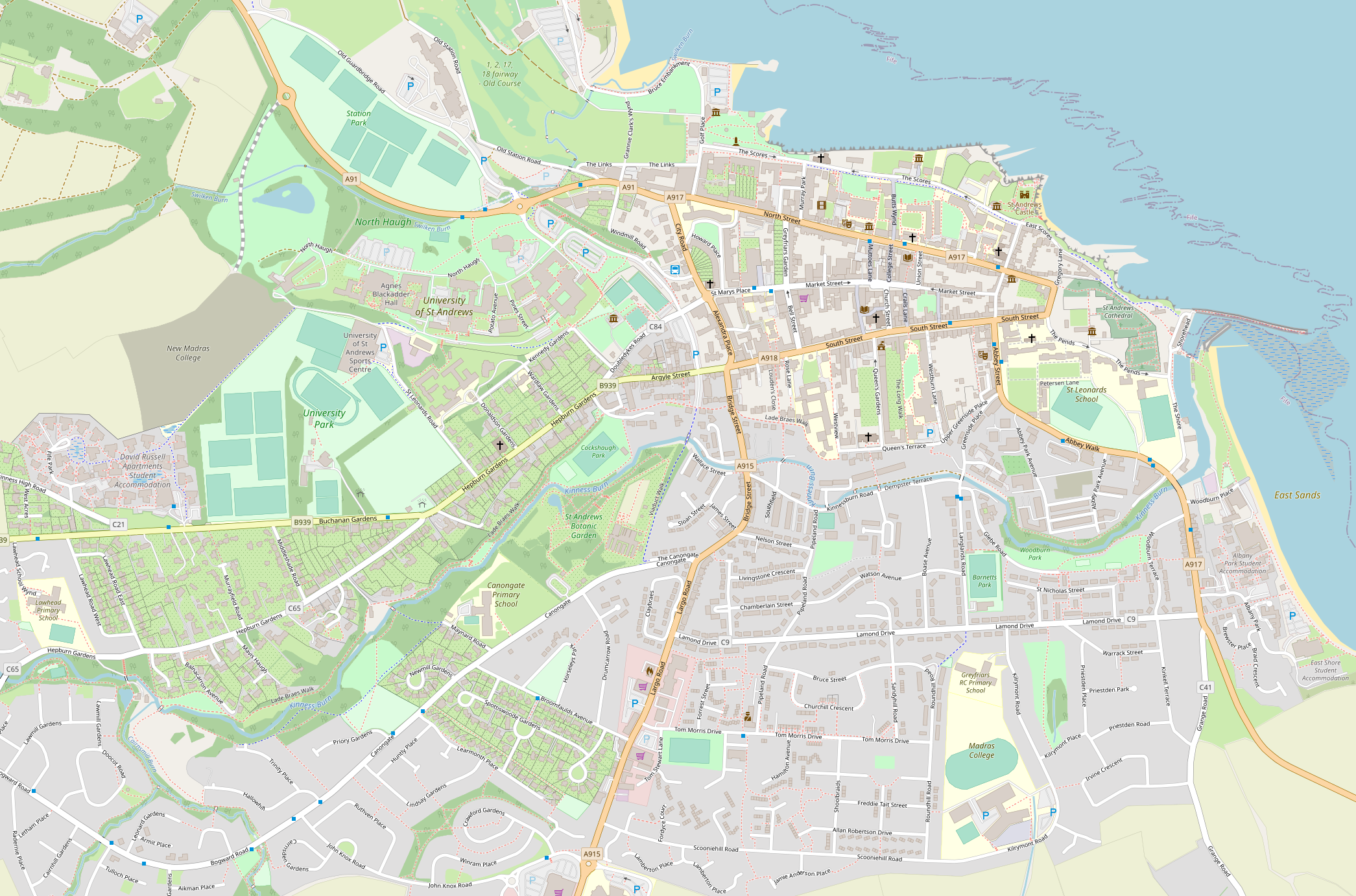
- Location within St Andrews
- Alternative names: NPH

General information
- Location: Fife, 117 North Street, St Andrews, KY16 9AD, St Andrews, Scotland
- Coordinates: 56°20′30.46″N 2°47′51.6″W

Design and construction
- Architect: James Hoey Scott
- Architecture firm: Gillespie and Scott

Listed Building – Category B
- Official name: 117 NORTH STREET, THE NEW PICTURE HOUSE
- Designated: 2 June 2008
- Reference no.: LB51110

The New Picture House (often called the NPH) is an independent cinema in St Andrews, Scotland. The cinema opened in December 1930 with an original capacity of 910 seats and one screen, though was subsequently remodelled to contain three screens later equipped with traditional film projectors, digital projectors, and 3D projectors. In September 2024, the cinema closed to allow works to turn the venue into a luxury sports bar, and is due to reopen in summer 2025.

In October 2023, T-Squared Social, a luxury sports bar chain owned by NEXUS Luxury Collection and founded its namesakes and NEXUS shareholders Justin Timberlake and Tiger Woods, announced plans to open a new location within the New Picture House. If approved, plans will see the venue retaining only one screen. The rest of the venue is to host bar and dining areas, lounges, golf simulators, bowling, dart lanes, and other entertainment. The New Picture House hopes that the development will secure its long-term future while providing a wider range of entertainment experiences within the town. Some local residents have criticised the plans, concerned that St Andrews would lose its only cinema, and arguing that a sports bar is designed to appeal to tourists and does not fit in with the town.

On 19 September 2024, the New Picture House showed its last film as an independent picture house and closed prior to works commencing for the T-Squared Social sports bar. The venue is due to reopen once renovation works are complete in summer 2025.
