= Kinness Burn =

Stream in St Andrews, Scotland

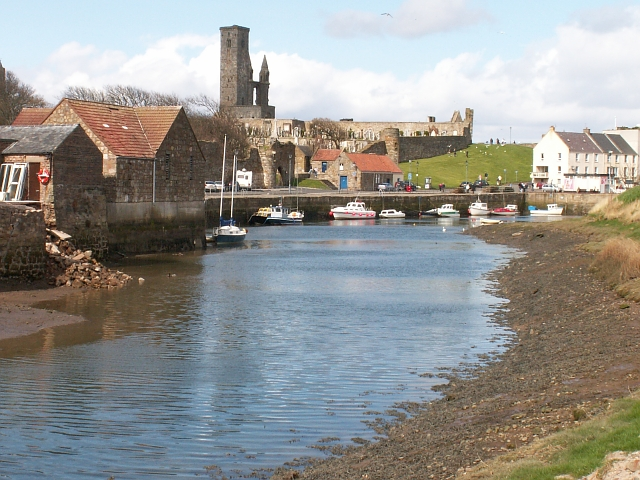
- Kinness Burn and the inner harbour of St Andrews. St Rule’s Tower and the ruins of the Cathedral are in the background.

Location
- Country: Scotland

Physical characteristics
- Mouth: North Sea
  - location: St Andrews
  - coordinates: 56.3395°N 2.7835°W

The Kinness Burn is a 5 3/4 miles (9.5 kilometres) long burn (stream) in Fife, Scotland. It flows into the North Sea through the inner harbour of St Andrews on the east coast of Fife. The name of the village of Strathkinness, located 3 miles west of St Andrews, means the valley (strath) of the Kinness. The source of the burn is on a low Clatto hill to the west of Strathkinness, near the village of Blebocraigs.

The St Andrews Botanic Garden is located on the banks of the Kinness Burn.

The Fife Pilgrim Way follows the Kinness Burn for about a mile within St Andrews, where it joins the Lade Braes Walk.
