= Blackfriars, St Andrews =

Ruins of Chapel, St Andrews, Scotland

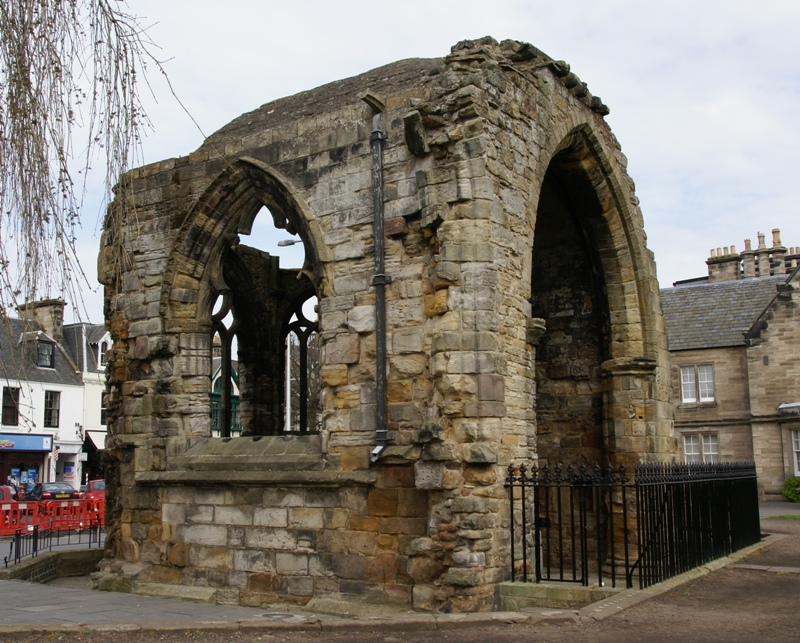
- Remains of the friary
- Interactive map of Blackfriars, St Andrews

Monastery information
- Established: 15th century (uncertain)
- Disestablished: June 1559
- Dedication: Virgin Mary
- Diocese: St Andrews

Site
- Visible remains: Side apse (pictured)

Blackfriars is the modern name for the Dominican friary of St Mary which existed in St Andrews, Scotland, in the later Middle Ages. The name is also used for the modern ruins.

== History ==
Some later sources claim that the friary was founded in the late 13th century, but these are spurious, and its actual foundation probably did not occur until the mid-15th century. The first known prior of the house is attested on 22 November 1464.

The foundation of a full Dominican house was preceded by a small oratory or hospice. As James Beaton, archbishop of St Andrews, claimed that he and his predecessors were founders of the house, it is likely the foundation was episcopal. The foundation of the house was probably prompted by the needs of the University of St Andrews.

=== Expansion ===
In the 1510s at least, the friary was expanded, the number of brothers rising from two to five. In 1519 the Hospital of St Nicholas and the Dominican friary at Cupar were taken over by St Andrews friary, with the friary at St Monans partially united. While the friars at Cupar moved to St Andrews, friars were left at St Monans to live out their years.

The house was severely damaged by the forces of Norman Leslie [of Rothes] in 1547. Sometime after 14 June 1559 but before 22 June 1559 the friars were "expelled from their destroyed place" by Protestant reformers. This was part of a general movement, associated with the Scottish Reformation, hostile to friaries and other aspects of the old Catholic order. The property of the house was given to the burgh of St Andrews by Queen Mary on 17 April 1567. The remains of a vaulted apse lie where Bell Street meets South Street, outside Madras College.
