= St Andrews Botanic Garden =

University botanical garden in Fife, Scotland

Coordinates: 56.3346°N 2.8066°W

Designations

Inventory of Gardens and Designed Landscapes in Scotland
- Official name: St Andrews Botanic Garden
- Designated: 7 November 2016
- Reference no.: GDL00405

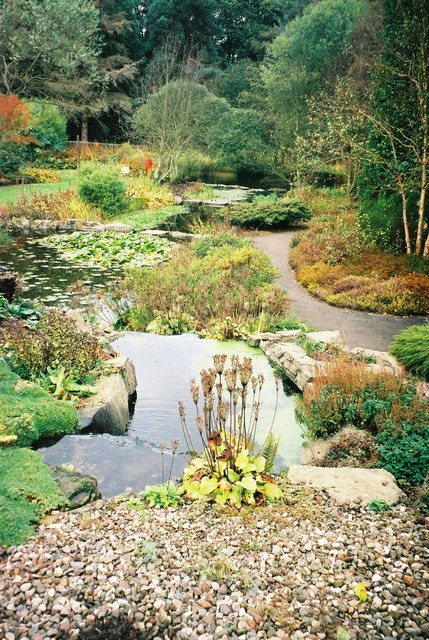
St Andrews Botanic Garden

The St Andrews Botanic Garden is an 18-acre botanical garden in the university town of St Andrews in Fife, Scotland. It is located on the banks of the wooded Kinness Burn in the Canongate area, on the southern edge of the town. The gardens are supported by the University of St Andrews and Fife Council, and by admission charges. The garden is included on the Inventory of Gardens and Designed Landscapes in Scotland.

== Collections ==
It contains several thousand species of native and non-native plants. These are laid out in zones of woodland, meadow, herbaceous beds, sand dunes, a large rockery and a series of ponds.

There are borders that specialise in Chinese and Chilean flora, containing both woody and herbaceous specimens.to recreate the full environment of those parts of the world.

There are significant collections of Cotoneaster, Berberis and Sorbus.

The gardens also house an algal herbarium based on the collection of seaweed specimens gathered originally by the phycologist Margaret Gatty (1809-1873) and enlarged since her death.

== History ==
The gardens were founded by the University of St Andrews in 1889 on a different site within the grounds of St Mary's College. The principal founder was the botanist Dr John Hardie Wilson. The early site consisted of 78 similar beds laid out according to the Bentham and Hooker system of plant classification. The valuable town centre site grew in size from 0.1 to 2.8 hectares (0.25 to 6.92 acres), and in the early 1960s the present site, which was then agricultural land, was bought to allow for future development. The new site was laid out to a design meant to mitigate the Scottish climate with a dense barrier of pine trees along the western edge, and many shrubs and understory trees around the site to give additional shelter.

== Gallery ==
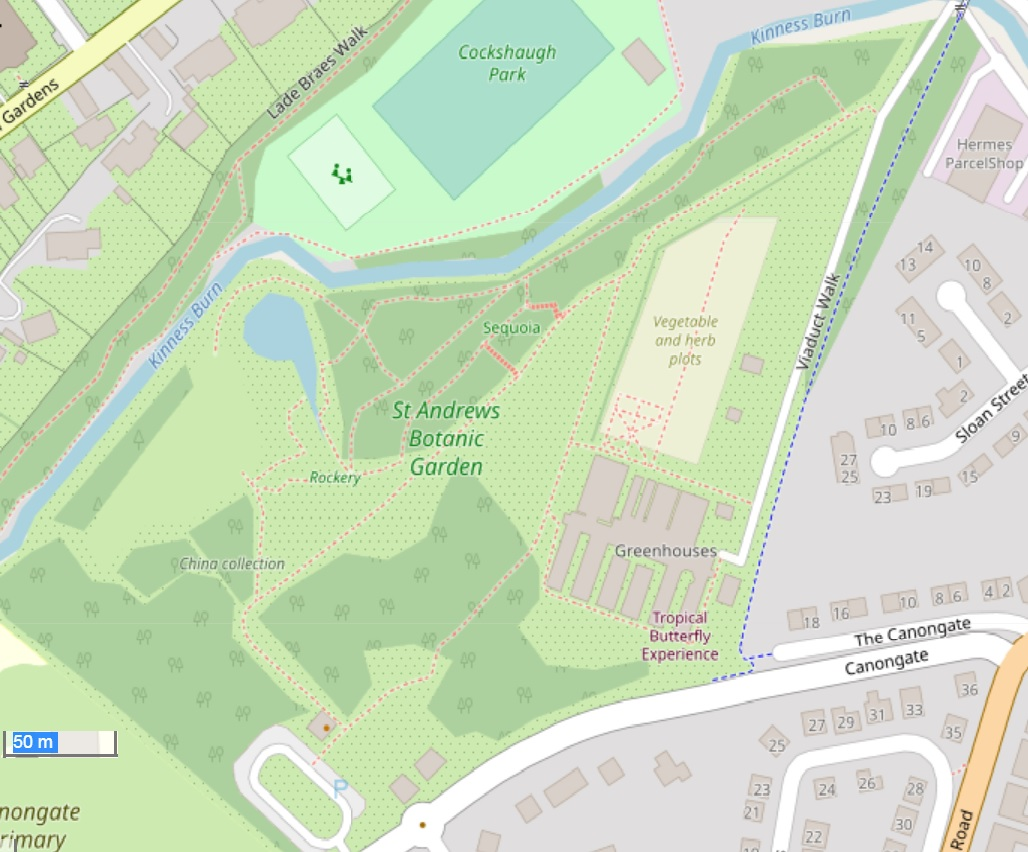
Plan of St Andrews Botanic Garden.

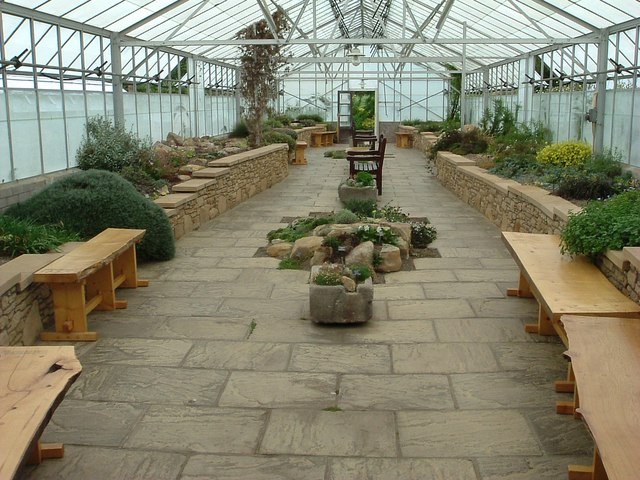
Greenhouse interior

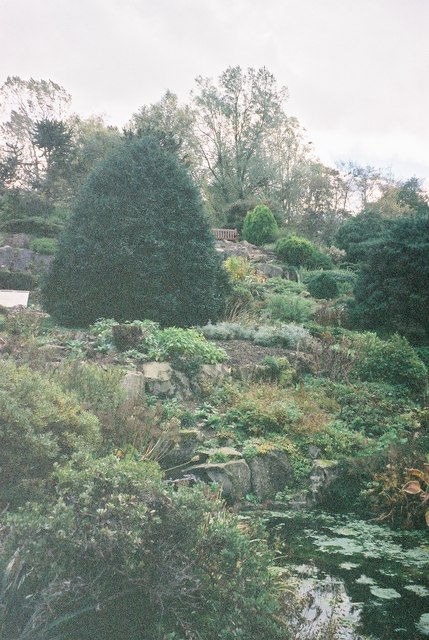
Rockery and pond

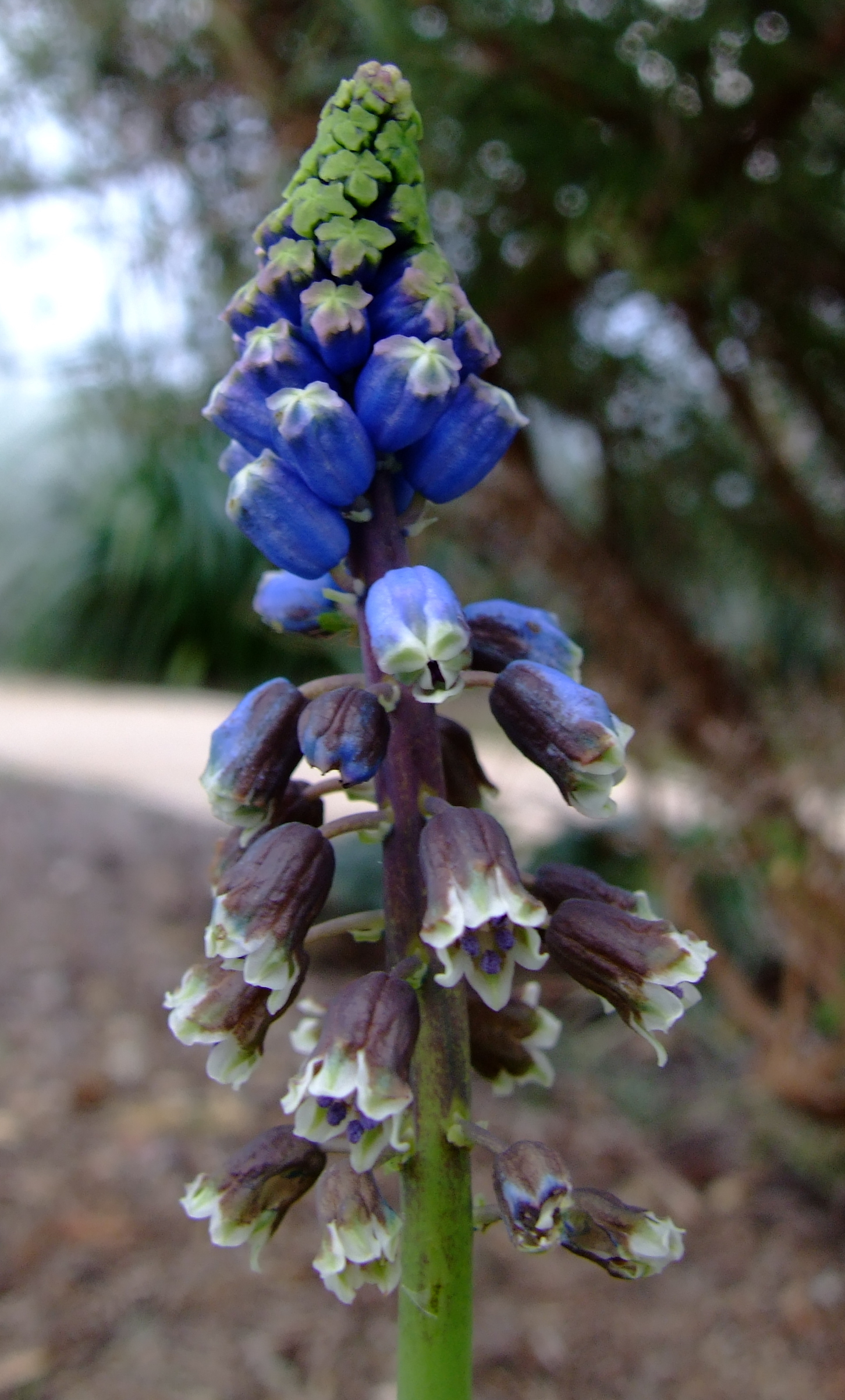
Flower in the genus Muscari

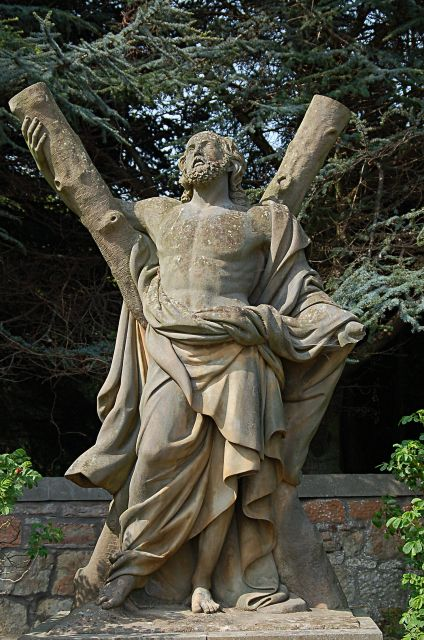
A copy of the statue of St Andrew by Francois Duquesnoy which stands in St Peters. Executed in Dalmeny Sandstone it is believed to have been made by the Musselburgh born sculptor Alexander Handyside Ritchie (1804–1870). It was rescued and moved to the Botanical gardens in the winter of 1964/65. It has since been relocated to MUSA, a museum on the scores.
