= Kinkell, Fife =

Coordinates: 56.324652°N 2.754693°W

Kinkell in Scotland

Kinkell was an estate to the east of St Andrews in Scotland. In the Middle Ages it was the site of a chapel, hospital, dovecote and a castle or manor house. The castle was an important location for conventicles in the period following the restoration of the House of Stuart. Little trace of the buildings remain, but the name is preserved in Kinkell Ness, Kinkell Braes, Kinkell Byre, Kinkell Farm and so on. The braes are now occupied by modern structures such as a caravan park, waste treatment plant, farm and golf course.

== Location ==
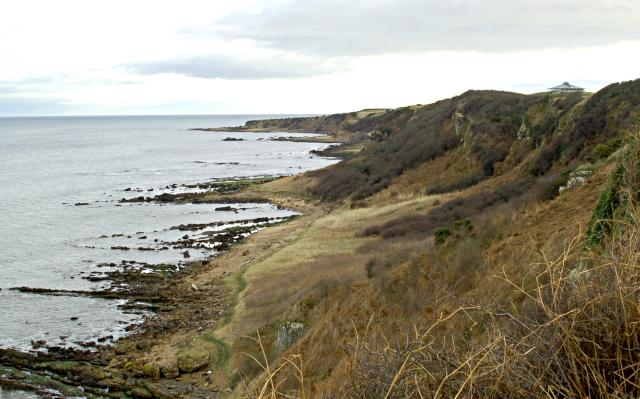
Coastline by Kinkell Looking towards Kinkell Ness. The pagoda is part of the Fairmont Hotel on the new golf course

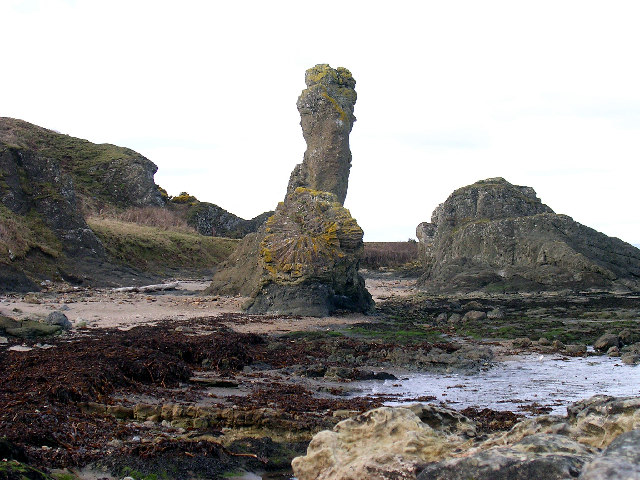
The Rock and Spindle.

Kinkell Braes stretch eastward from St Andrews along the North Sea coast. The rocks are jumbled and convoluted, particularly the great gaunt mass of grey sandstone at the foot of the cliff called the Maiden Rock. Kinkell Cave is of considerable size, extending into the Brae, roofed by a smooth mass of rock that reaches up at an acute angle from the east side of the floor. It may have been used as a stronghold at times.

Past the headland named Kinkell Ness there is a small natural harbour or creek called Kinkell Harbour that could be used as a place of refuge from the southeast gales. The castle stood on the brae above this harbour. The "Rock and Spindle" stands beside the harbour. This is an eroded volcanic plug with a tall stack and with a structure resembling a spinning wheel at its base, made from twisted basalt columns.

== Early years ==
The name was said to derive from the Chapel of St Anna which was built by Kellach, the Bishop of St Andrews, around 875 AD. The Culdee, or Céli Dé, an ascetic Christian community, had a chapter at Cennrighmonaidh, or Kilrymont monastery, in St Andrews, and served in the Church of St Mary on the Rock. The Céli Dé held the lands of Kinkell in the 1170s. St Nicholas Hospital lay on the lands of Kinkell. The house functioned as a home for lepers until at least March 1438. The sixteenth-century Book of Assumptions said the Provost of St Mary's held the lands of Kinkell at the time of writing.

The castle or manor house of Kinkell was a little inland from the Rock or Needle of St Andrews, where it was said that William Wallace killed three Englishmen who had taken refuge. Recorded owners of Kinkell castle were the families of Moubray, Hepburn, Monypenny of Pitmillie and then Hamilton.

== Conventicles ==
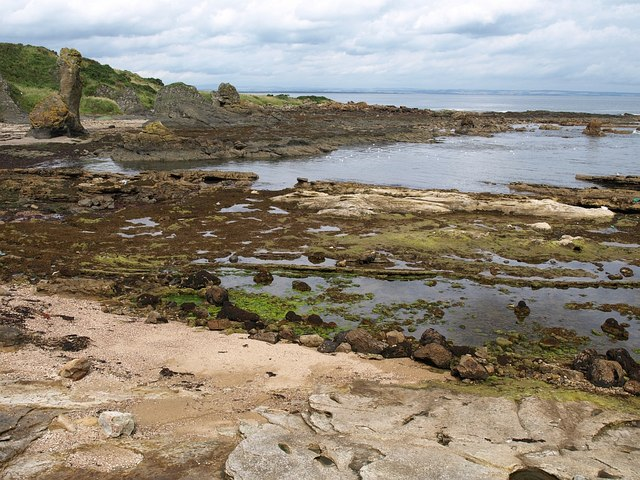
Kinkell Harbour, SE of the Kinkell Ness. Today no structure can be found. The creek is approached by a track deeply rutted in the rocks

Alexander Hamilton, the owner of the castle in the late seventeenth century, was a devoted Covenanter. He was willing to harbour ministers who were hiding from the law, and Kinkell was often the site for conventicles. Early in 1674 the celebrated preacher John Blackadder had come to speak to a crowd that filled two chambers, a long gallery and the courtyard. The wife of Archbishop Sharp had the town militia sent to break up the meeting, and they were accompanied by various young men and ruffians out for sport. But on arrival, seeing the numbers of attendees, the militia did little, but sent for more help. Later they returned to the town. The next day Blackadder returned to preach again, and a huge crowd of people from St Andrews went to hear him. When the Archbishop asked the provost to send the militia to break up this meeting, the provost said he could not, since the militia had also gone to hear the preaching.

John Welsh preached to a large crowd at Kinkell on another occasion. Philip Standfield, son of Sir James Standfield and a student at St Andrews University, attended the sermon and threw some missile that struck the preacher. Welsh said "I do not know who has put this public affront on Christ; but, be he who he may, there shall be more at his death than hearing me preach today". This turned out to be true, for the young man was later hanged for murdering his father.

== Recent years ==
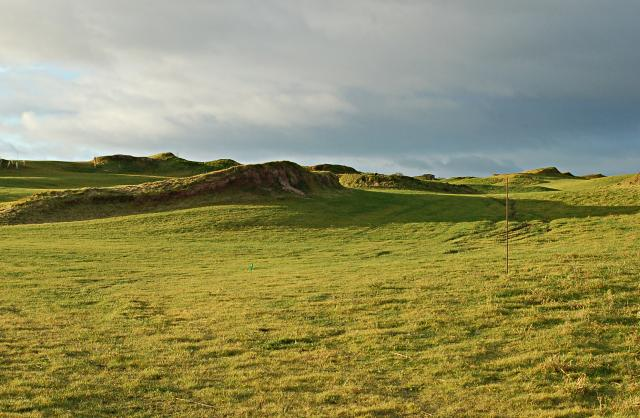
Castle Course, Kinkell Braes, January 2007

By the 18th century the castle was in a ruinous state. At the start of the nineteenth century the remains of the castle and chapel were still standing on the brae above Kinkell harbour. However, an 1884 book said the site was "merely a rocky face, studded with blooming whins in summer, and a row of blasted ash-trees". A new golf course was built in the area in the 2000s, taking up a large part of Kinkell farm on the brae above Kinkell harbor, but no trace was found of the castle. If it had been found it would have made the course more attractive, but would also have added costs due to the need to work round archaeological excavations.

== Sources ==
- Barrow, G. W. S. (2003). "The Clergy at St Andrews". The Kingdom of the Scots: Government, Church and Society from the Eleventh to the Fourteenth Century. Edinburgh University Press. ISBN 0-7486-1802-3.
- Bruce, George (1884). Wrecks and reminiscences of St. Andrews bay. p. 60.
- Cowan, Ian B.; Easson, David E. (1976). Medieval Religious Houses: Scotland With an Appendix on the Houses in the Isle of Man (2nd ed.). London and New York: Longman. ISBN 0-582-12069-1.
- Fleming, David Hay (1881). The alphabetic guide book to St. Andrews. John Innes.
- Gummer, Scott (2008). The Seventh at St. Andrews: How Scotsman David McLay Kidd and His Ragtag Band Built the First New Course on Golf's Holy Soil in Nearly a Century. Penguin. ISBN 978-1-59240-398-1.
- Leighton, John M.; Stewart, James (1840). History of the county of Fife: from the earliest period to the present time. Vol. 3. J. Swan.
- Taylor, Simon (2009). The Place-Names of Fife, Volume Three: St Andrews and the East Neuk. Donington: Shaun Tyas. ISBN 978-1-900289-97-9.
- "The Rock and Spindle, from St Andrews". WalkHighlands.
