= Newton of Kinkell =

Coordinates: 57.54614°N 4.37745°W

- Location within the Highland council area
- OS grid reference: NH578531
- Council area: Highland
- Country: Scotland
- Sovereign state: United Kingdom
- Post town: Conon Bridge
- Postcode district: IV7 8
- Police: Scotland
- Fire: Scottish
- Ambulance: Scottish

Newton of Kinkell is a hamlet in Dingwall, Black Isle, Ross-shire, Scottish Highlands and is in the Scottish council area of Highland.

Newton of Ferintosh is another crofting township, which lies directly to the east of Newton of Kinkell. The village of Conon Bridge is 2 miles (3 km) northwest of Newton of Kinkell and 2 miles (3 km) northeast of Muir of Ord.
