= St Nicholas Hospital, St Andrews =

Medieval hospital in Scotland

Coordinates: 56.33348°N 2.78123°W

Hospital of St Nicholas at St Andrews
- Interactive map of Hospital of St Nicholas at St Andrews

Monastery information
- Established: 12th century (uncertain)
- Disestablished: uncertain
- Dedication: St Nicholas
- Diocese: St Andrews

Architecture
- Grid reference: NO 5180 1595

St Nicholas Hospital was a medieval hospital in St Andrews, Fife. It was located around what is today St Nicholas farmhouse at the Steading, between Albany Park and the East Sands Leisure Centre. Of unknown origin, the establishment served as a hospice for lepers outside the town between the beach at East Sands and the old coastal route. Parts of the hospital complex have been excavated in the 20th century, with rumours of a graveyard.

== Leper house and poor house ==
The hospital lay on the lands of Kinkell, once belonging to the Céli Dé of St Andrews. The earliest notices of the leper house appear to date to the late 12th century. Perhaps the earliest record, a grant of 2 oxgangs in Powgavie (near Inchture in Gowrie) by Hugh Giffard, dated between 1178 and 1185. The other is a grant by Roger de Beaumont (died 1202), bishop of St Andrews, datable 1189 x 1195, granted the house the right to send a cart to the "muir of Crail" (King's Muir) to obtain heather. Both charters survive in 16th-century confirmations to the Dominican Order, both directly and indirectly from a confirmation of 1540 (Registrum magni sigilli regum Scotorum, vol. iii no. 2032). The same document reveals that St Nicholas also held the land of Peekie and a toft and croft at Lundin (between Leven and Largo).

The house functioned as a home for lepers until at least March 1438. It is referred to for the last time as a leper house in a document dating to 14 March 1438, but is called a "poor house" in another document dating to 12 May. In 1529 it was taken over by the Dominicans, becoming attached to their local house, Blackfriars, St Andrews. It was still in use in 1583, when an endowment of victual was made for its poor.

The hospital and its graveyard was located around the farm which became known as St Nicholas' farm (today a bed and breakfast with the dependent buildings converted into houses). The letter-book of James Haldenston, prior of St Andrews, reveals that the township was also called Liberton ("Leper toun"). The farmer at St Nicholas is said to have discovered 30 bodies in the vicinity of the farmhouse in the late 1950s.

== Modern excavations around St Nicholas farmhouse ==
Between November 1986 and March 1987 excavation took place in the area, prior to the construction of the East Sands Leisure Centre and car park. It is thought that the excavation uncovered the western boundary-wall of the hospital with another building (possibly a bakery) built against the wall's east face. Medieval pottery was found, and the building appears to have been levelled in either the 14th or 15th century. More of the wall was uncovered in 1993, and in 1994 excavations took place along the Interceptor Sewer Pipeline (between Pipeland Cottage and St Nicholas farmhouse) after a bronze hoard and a few stone axes were found in the area. Two trenches at the farm revealed animal bones, pottery fragments, and an 18th or 19th century field drain.

In February and March 1997 more excavations uncovered a wall of a large building with 16th-century green-glazed pottery, along with a smaller wall, perhaps coming from 16th- or 17th-century redevelopment. Further archaeological activity in 1999, in advance of the construction of a nursery south of the Leisure Centre and south-west of the 1987 area, unearthed a cobbled road and bones from four humans who lived 1530 x 1310 BC, 130 x 390 AD, 430 x 650 AD, and 530 x 660 AD.
