= Boarhills railway station =

Disused railway station in Boarhills, Fife

Boarhills
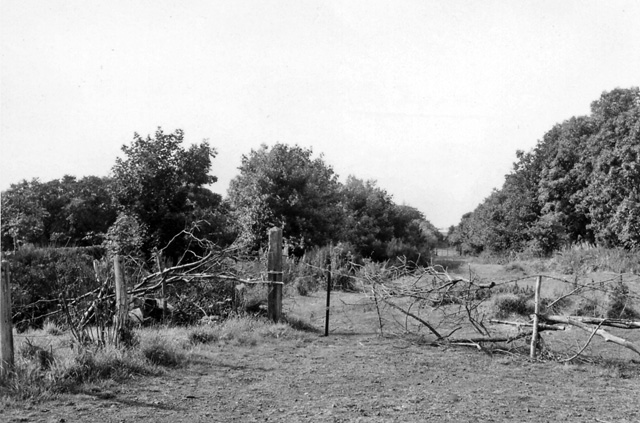
- The site of the station in 1974

General information
- Location: Boarhills, Fife; Scotland
- Coordinates: 56.3103°N 2.7031°W
- Grid reference: NO566133
- Platforms: 1

Other information
- Status: Disused

History
- Original company: Anstruther and St Andrews Railway
- Pre-grouping: North British Railway
- Post-grouping: LNER

Key dates
- 1 September 1883: Opened
- 1 January 1917: closed
- 1 February 1919: reopened
- 22 September 1930: Closed to passengers
- 6 September 1965: Closed to goods
Location

Boarhills railway station served the hamlet of Boarhills, Fife, Scotland from 1883 to 1930 on the Anstruther and St Andrews Railway.

== History ==
The station was opened on 1 September 1883 when the Anstruther and St Andrews Railway opened the line between Anstruther and Boarhills. The station was the temporary terminus while the remainder of the railway to St Andrews was completed, this section opened on 1 June 1887.

To the north was the goods yard able to accommodate livestock, the yard was equipped with a 1½ ton crane.

The station was host to a LNER camping coach from 1935 to 1939.

The station closed on 1 January 1917, reopening on 1 February 1919 then closed to passengers on 22 September 1930, although there was occasional later excursion use as the line remained open. The line and station closed to goods on 6 September 1965.

Preceding station	Disused railways	Following station
Stravithie; Line and station closed	Anstruther and St Andrews Railway	Kingsbarns; Line and station closed
