= St. Monance railway station =

Disused railway station in St Monans, Fife

St. Monance
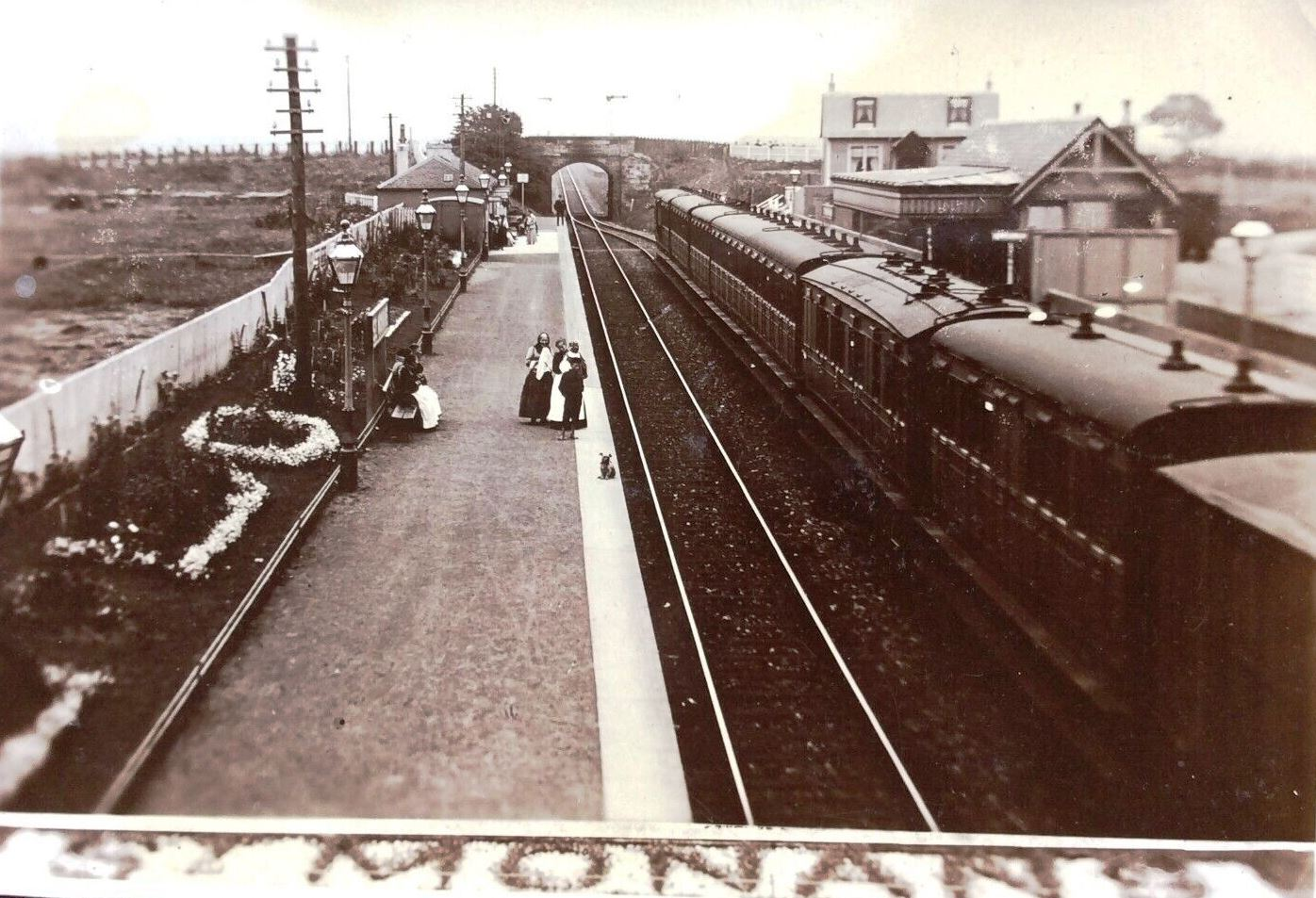

General information
- Location: St Monans, Fife; Scotland
- Coordinates: 56.2075°N 2.7694°W
- Grid reference: NO523019
- Platforms: 1

Other information
- Status: Disused

History
- Original company: The Leven and East of Fife Railway
- Pre-grouping: North British Railway
- Post-grouping: LNER

Key dates
- 1 September 1863: Opened as St Monance
- October 1875: Name changed to St Monans
- February 1936: Name reverted to St Monance
- 6 September 1965: Closed
Location

St. Monance railway station served the village of St Monans, Fife, Scotland from 1863 to 1965 on the Fife Coast Railway.

== History ==
The station was opened on 1 September 1863 by the Leven and East of Fife Railway when it opened the extension of its line from Kilconquhar to Anstruther.

Its name was changed to St Monans in October 1875 but changed back to St Monance in February 1936.

A camping coach was positioned here by the Scottish Region from 1954 to 1963 and two coaches from 1956 to 1958, in the final year a Pullman camping coach was used.

The station closed to passengers on 6 September 1965. The line closed to goods traffic on 18 July 1966.

== Bibliography ==
- Grant, Donald J. (2017). Directory of the Railway Companies of Great Britain (1st ed.). Kibworth Beauchamp, Leicestershire: Troubador Publishing Ltd. ISBN 978-1-78803-768-6.
- Hurst, Geoffrey (1992). Register of Closed Railways: 1948-1991. Worksop, Nottinghamshire: Milepost Publications. ISBN 0-9477-9618-5.
- McRae, Andrew (1998). British Railways Camping Coach Holidays: A Tour of Britain in the 1950s and 1960s. Vol. Scenes from the Past: 30 (Part Two). Foxline. ISBN 1-870119-53-3.
- Quick, Michael (2022) [2001]. Railway passenger stations in Great Britain: a chronology (PDF). version 5.04. Railway & Canal Historical Society. Archived from the original (PDF) on 25 November 2022.

Preceding station	Disused railways	Following station
Pittenweem; Line and station closed	North British Railway; The Leven and East of Fife Railway	Elie; Line and station closed
