= Mount Melville railway station =

Disused railway station in Mount Melville, Fife

Mount Melville

General information
- Location: Mount Melville, Fife; Scotland
- Coordinates: 56.3188°N 2.8174°W
- Grid reference: NO495143
- Platforms: 2

Other information
- Status: Disused

History
- Original company: Anstruther and St Andrews Railway
- Pre-grouping: North British Railway
- Post-grouping: LNER

Key dates
- 1 June 1887: Opened
- 1 January 1917: Closed
- 1 February 1919: Reopened
- 22 September 1930: Closed permanently
Location

Mount Melville railway station served the Mount Melville estate outside St Andrews, Fife, Scotland from 1887 to 1930 on the Anstruther and St Andrews Railway.

== History ==
The station opened on 1 June 1887 by the St Andrews Railway. It closed on 1 January 1917 but reopened on 1 February 1919 before closing permanently on 22 September 1930.

Preceding station	Disused railways	Following station
St Andrews; Line and station closed	Anstruther and St Andrews Railway	Stravithie; Line and station closed
