= St Andrews (Old) railway station =

Disused railway station in St Andrews, Fife

St Andrews

General information
- Location: St Andrews, Fife; Scotland
- Coordinates: 56.3447°N 2.8121°W
- Grid reference: NO499172

Other information
- Status: Disused

History
- Original company: St Andrews Railway
- Pre-grouping: North British Railway

Key dates
- 1 July 1852: Opened
- 1 June 1887: Closed
Location

St Andrews railway station, also known as St Andrews Links, Links Station or Old Station, was the first railway station in the town of St Andrews, Fife, Scotland. The station was opened by the St Andrews Railway in 1852. It remained open to passengers until 1887, when a new station was completed closer to the town.

== History ==
The station opened on 1 July 1852 by the St Andrews Railway. Although the line was built to double track standards, it only carried a single line. Passenger services used this stop for almost 35 years until 1 June 1887, when St Andrews (New) railway station opened. The new station, which was 700 m (2,300 ft) south east of the old station, was conveniently sited less than a quarter of a mile from the town centre. After closure to passenger services, the old station became a goods yard with depot and sidings. A signal box, also called St Andrews Links, opened at the same time to the north of the old station. It took over the operation of the semaphore signalling and sets of points west of the town; the box closed in 1957.

Preceding station	Disused railways	Following station
Guardbridge; Line and station closed	St Andrews Railway	St Andrews (New); Line and station closed
