= Nineteenth hole =

Golf slang for a bar, pub or tavern

In golf, the nineteenth hole is a slang term for a pub, bar, or restaurant on or near the golf course, very often the clubhouse itself. A standard round of golf has only eighteen (18) holes of play. An alternate term for a bar is a "watering hole"; thus, by extension, continuing the day after 18 holes of golf at a watering hole makes the bar a "nineteenth hole". The concept is similar to Après-ski in skiing. The R&A has called the Jigger Inn, which overlooks the 17th Road Hole on the Old Course in St Andrews, Scotland, "Arguably the most famous 19th hole in the world", while Golf Monthly has also called it "the most famous 19th hole in golf".

== References in media ==
- The golf stories of author P. G. Wodehouse, which are narrated by his character, the Oldest Member, discuss the nineteenth hole.
- At the beginning and again towards the end of the Lars von Trier movie Melancholia, the main character Claire is shown passing the nineteenth hole, which in reality did not exist, on the golf course belonging to the mansion where the movie takes place. Lars von Trier said this was a reference to Limbo.
- In a 1985 episode of Knight Rider entitled "The Nineteenth Hole" (Season 3, Episode 16), the term is used as slang, meaning the place where "they bury people who get in the way".
- A 1989 British television sitcom The Nineteenth Hole, written by Johnny Speight and starring Eric Sykes, was centred on the nineteenth hole. Felt to be racist, sexist and unfunny, it was cancelled after just one series.
- In the first episode of the BBC drama The Night Manager, Richard Roper's subordinate Corky says that the only golf he plays is the 19th hole.
