= Leuchars railway station =

Railway station in Fife, Scotland

Leuchars Scottish Gaelic: Luacharas
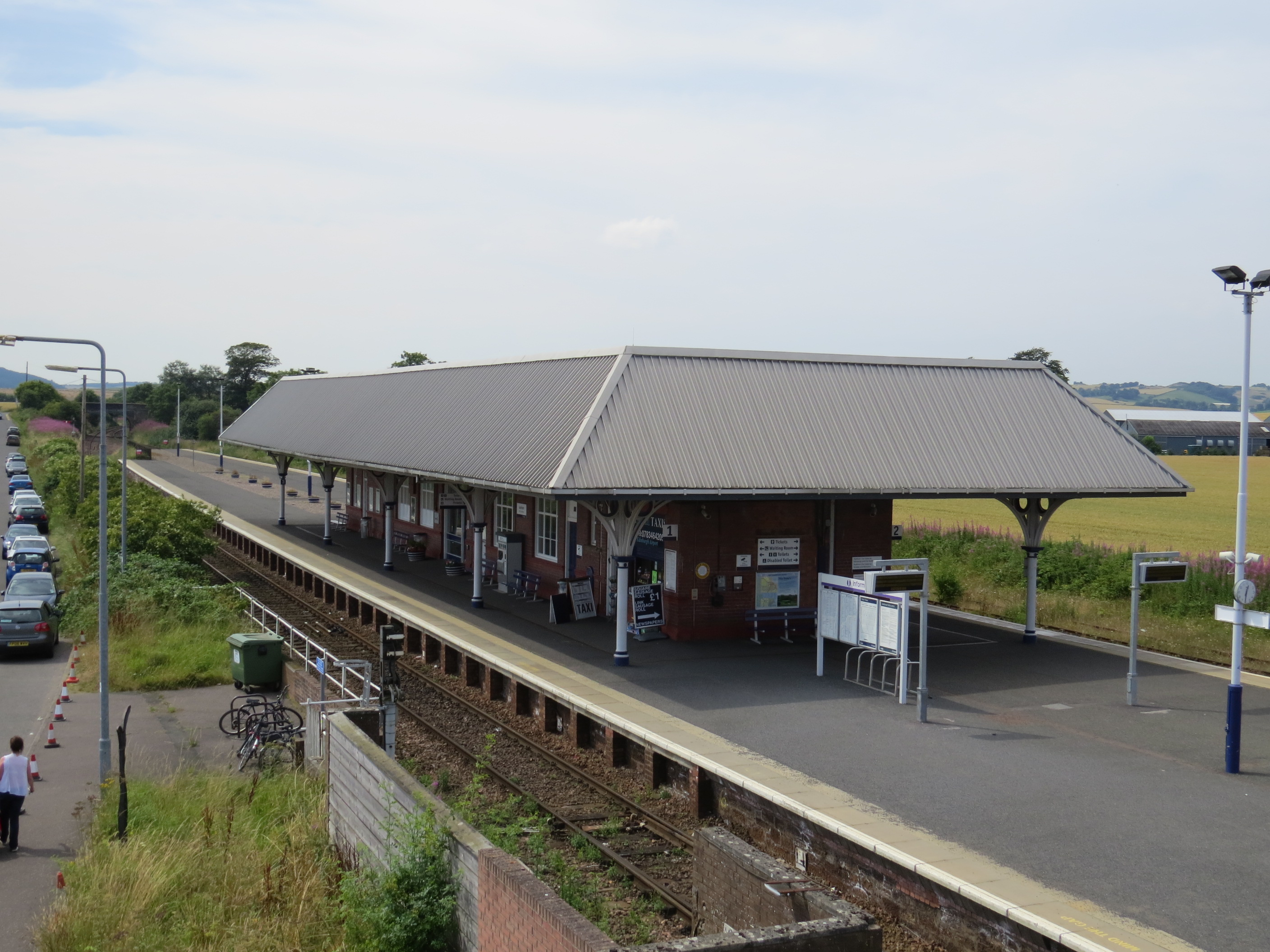
- The station in 2014.

General information
- Location: Leuchars, Fife; Scotland
- Coordinates: 56.3751°N 2.8936°W
- Grid reference: NO449206
- Managed by: ScotRail
- Platforms: 2

Other information
- Station code: LEU

Passengers
- 2020/21: ▼74,406
- 2021/22: ▲0.370 million
- 2022/23: ▲0.461 million
- 2023/24: ▲0.528 million
- 2024/25: ▲0.584 million
Location
Notes
- Passenger statistics from the Office of Rail and Road

Leuchars railway station (/ˈljuːxərs/ LEW-khərs, sometimes known as Leuchars (for St. Andrews)) serves the towns of Leuchars and St Andrews in Fife, Scotland. The station is the last northbound stop before Dundee.

The station was built as Leuchars Junction station for the route over the Tay Bridge to Dundee, the previous Leuchars station being on the line to Tayport.

There are buses and taxis available to transfer passengers to nearby St. Andrews, which does not have its own railway station; integrated tickets with the destination "St Andrews Bus" are sold.

The station is located near Leuchars Station, a British Army installation, formerly RAF Leuchars airbase.

Previous station operator First ScotRail announced plans during March 2008 to erect a wind turbine to meet the electricity requirements of the station, and hope to generate a small surplus of electricity which they can sell back to the National Grid. Leuchars will be the first station to be powered this way, and if the project, which was funded by Transport Scotland proves successful, it may be rolled out across other stations.

== History ==
The original station for Leuchars was some 45 chains (910 m) north of the current station and was opened on 17 May 1848. It became the junction for St Andrews on 1 July 1852. It was closed to passengers when Leuchars Junction opened on 1 June 1878 but reopened as "Leuchars (old)" six months later. It finally closed to passengers on 3 October 1921 and to goods on 6 November 1967.

Leuchars Junction opened on the current site, just south of the junction for the Tay Bridge, on 1 June 1878. It consisted of an island platform with a south facing bay for branch line trains for St Andrews, and a north facing bay for trains on the old main line to Tayport.

On 30 June 1913, the station buildings at Leuchars Junction burnt to the ground. This was widely believed to be arson by suffragettes. The current buildings are those of the 1913 rebuilding. After the closure of the Tayport line in 1967 and the St Andrews branch on 6 January 1969 the station ceased to be a junction and the two bays were filled in. The station was subsequently renamed "Leuchars (for St Andrews)".

== Services ==
The weekday (Monday - Friday) timetable is as follows:

Intercity trains

London North Eastern Railway:

- 3 trains per day (tpd) to London King's Cross. These trains are from Aberdeen.
- 1 tpd to Leeds from Aberdeen.
- 4 tpd to Aberdeen. Three of these trains are from London King's Cross and the other, an early-morning service, is from Leeds.

CrossCountry:

- 1 tpd to Penzance.
- 1 tpd to Aberdeen.

Caledonian Sleeper:

- 1 tpd to London Euston via Edinburgh, Preston and Crewe.
- 1 tpd to Aberdeen.

Local trains

ScotRail:

- 2 tph to Edinburgh.
- 1 tph to Aberdeen.
- 1 tph to Arbroath.
- 1 tpd to Glasgow Queen Street (Monday to Friday)

Preceding station	National Rail	Following station
Kirkcaldy	London North Eastern Railway; Northern Lights (London – Aberdeen)	Dundee
Kirkcaldy	Caledonian Sleeper; Highland Caledonian Sleeper	Dundee
Cupar	CrossCountry; Cross Country Route	Dundee
Cupar	ScotRail; Edinburgh–Dundee line	Dundee
	Historical railways	
Guardbridge	North British Railway; St Andrews Railway	Terminus
Dairsie	North British Railway; Edinburgh and Northern Railway	Leuchars (Old)
Dairsie	North British Railway; Edinburgh and Northern Railway	St Fort

== See also ==
- St Andrews rail link
