= Kingsbarns railway station =

Disused railway station in Kingsbarns, Fife

Kingsbarns
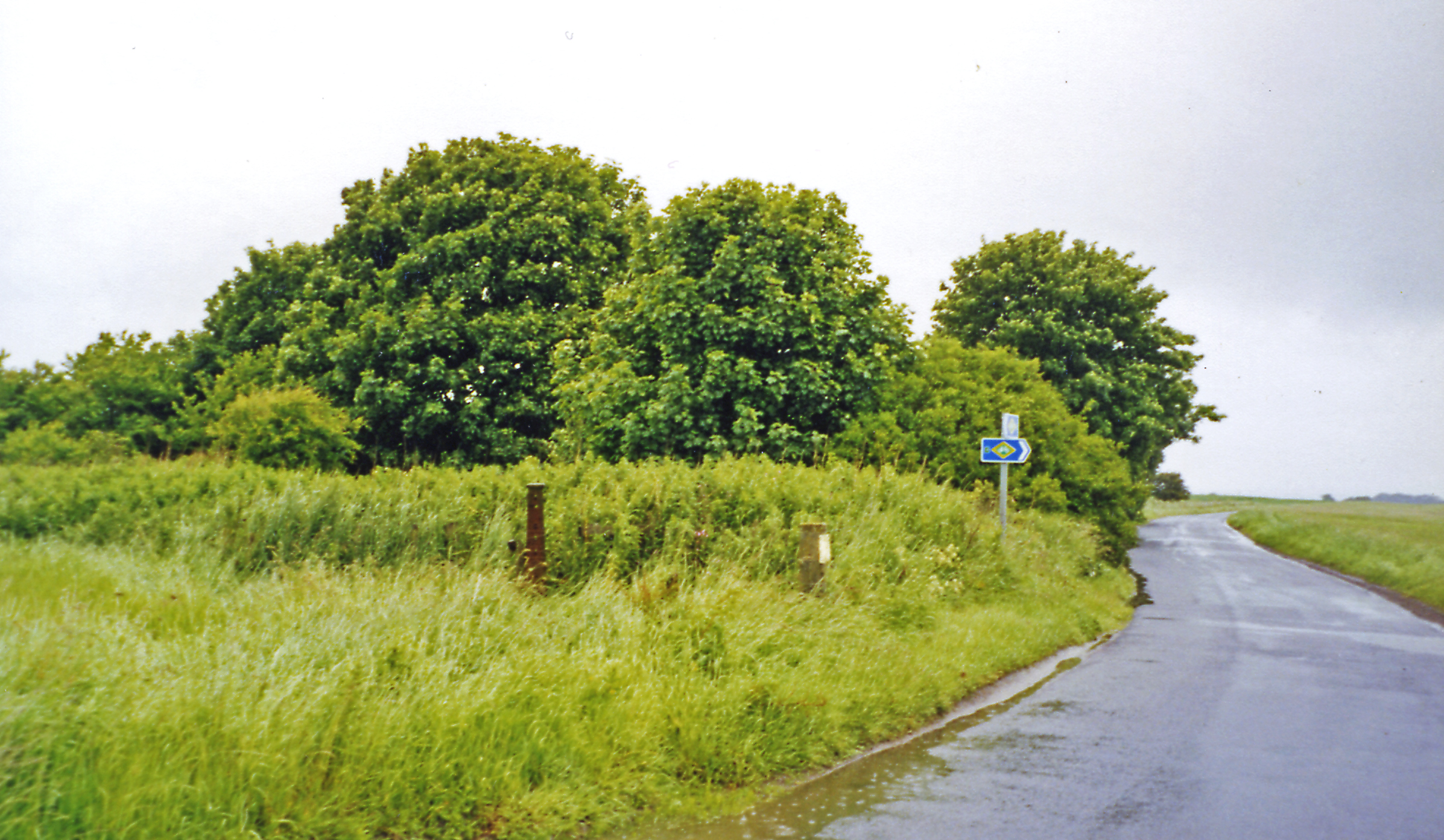
- The site of the station in 2002

General information
- Location: Kingsbarns, Fife; Scotland
- Coordinates: 56.2939°N 2.6808°W
- Grid reference: NO579114
- Platforms: 2

Other information
- Status: Disused

History
- Original company: Anstruther and St Andrews Railway
- Pre-grouping: North British Railway
- Post-grouping: LNER

Key dates
- 1 September 1883: Opened
- 22 September 1930: Closed
Location

Kingsbarns railway station served the village of Kingsbarns, Fife, Scotland from 1883 to 1930 on the Fife Coast Railway.

== History ==
The station opened on 1 September 1883 by the Anstruther and St Andrews Railway. It closed to both passengers and goods traffic on 22 September 1930, although it was occasionally used during the Second World War for RAF Kilduncan personnel.

Preceding station	Disused railways	Following station
Boarhills; Line and station closed	Fife Coast Railway	Crail; Line and station closed
