= Elie railway station =

Disused railway station in Elie and Earlsferry, Fife

Elie
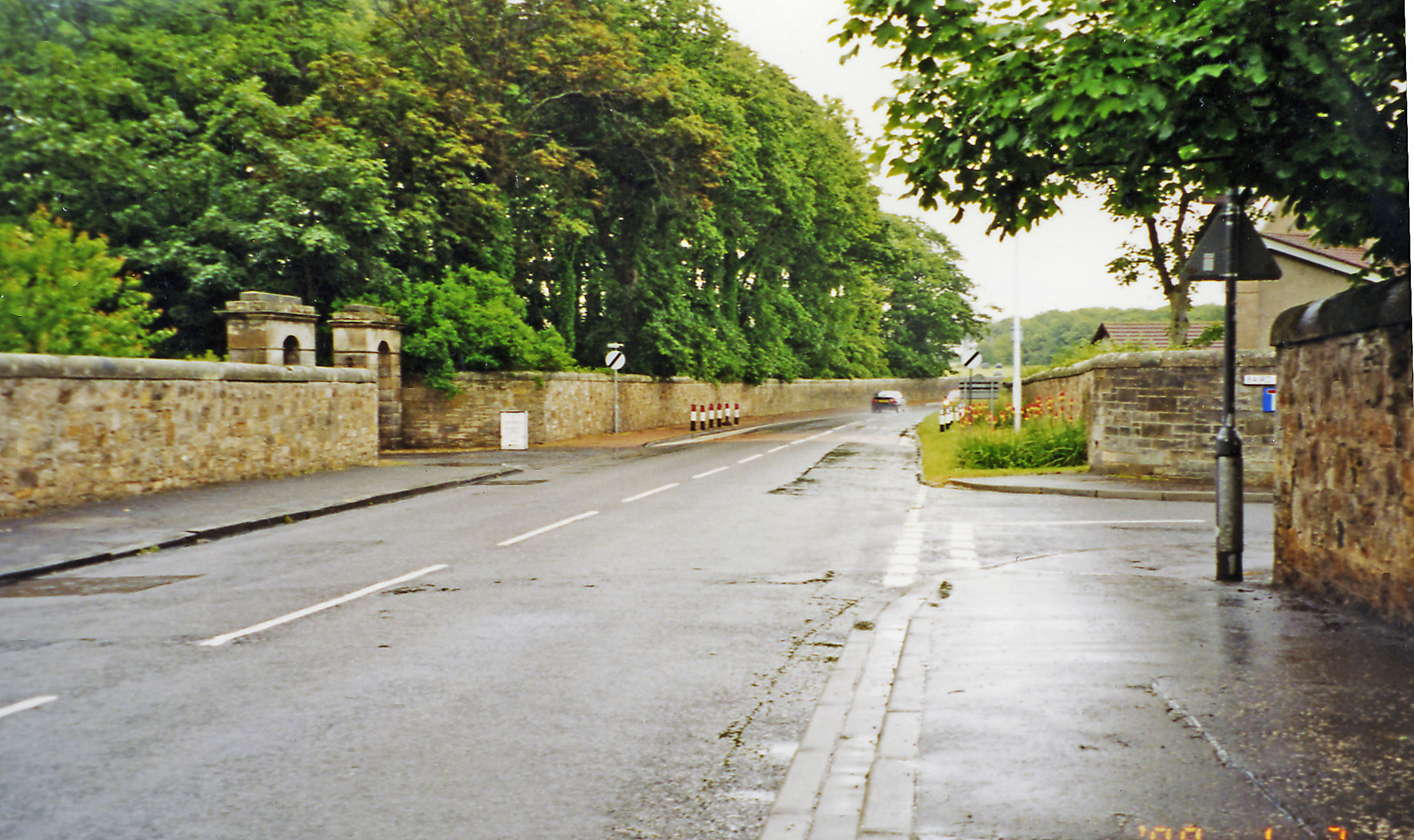
- The site of the station in 2002

General information
- Location: Elie and Earlsferry, Fife; Scotland
- Coordinates: 56.1912°N 2.8134°W
- Grid reference: NO496001
- Platforms: 2

Other information
- Status: Disused

History
- Original company: The Leven and East of Fife Railway
- Pre-grouping: North British Railway
- Post-grouping: LNER

Key dates
- 1 September 1863: Opened
- 6 September 1965: Closed
Location

Elie railway station served the town of Elie and Earlsferry, Fife, Scotland, from 1863 to 1965 on the Fife Coast Railway.

== History ==
The station was opened on 1 September 1863 by the Leven and East of Fife Railway when it opened the extension of its line from Kilconquhar to Anstruther.

A camping coach was positioned here by the Scottish Region from 1953 to 1955 and two coaches from 1956 to 1963.

The station closed to passengers on 6 September 1965. The line closed to goods traffic on 18 July 1966.

The site of the station is now occupied by modern housing.

== Bibliography ==
- Grant, Donald J. (2017). Directory of the Railway Companies of Great Britain (1st ed.). Kibworth Beauchamp, Leicestershire: Troubador Publishing Ltd. ISBN 978-1-78803-768-6.
- Hurst, Geoffrey (1992). Register of Closed Railways: 1948-1991. Worksop, Nottinghamshire: Milepost Publications. ISBN 0-9477-9618-5.
- McRae, Andrew (1998). British Railways Camping Coach Holidays: A Tour of Britain in the 1950s and 1960s. Vol. Scenes from the Past: 30 (Part Two). Foxline. ISBN 1-870119-53-3.
- Quick, Michael (2022) [2001]. Railway passenger stations in Great Britain: a chronology (PDF). version 5.04. Railway & Canal Historical Society. Archived from the original (PDF) on 25 November 2022.

Preceding station	Disused railways	Following station
Kilconquhar; Line and station closed	North British Railway; The Leven and East of Fife Railway	St. Monance; Line and station closed
