= Jigger Inn =

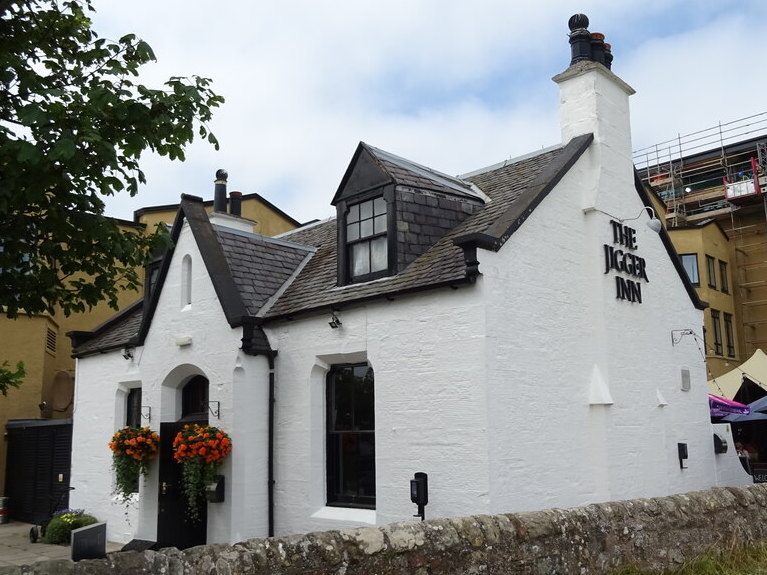
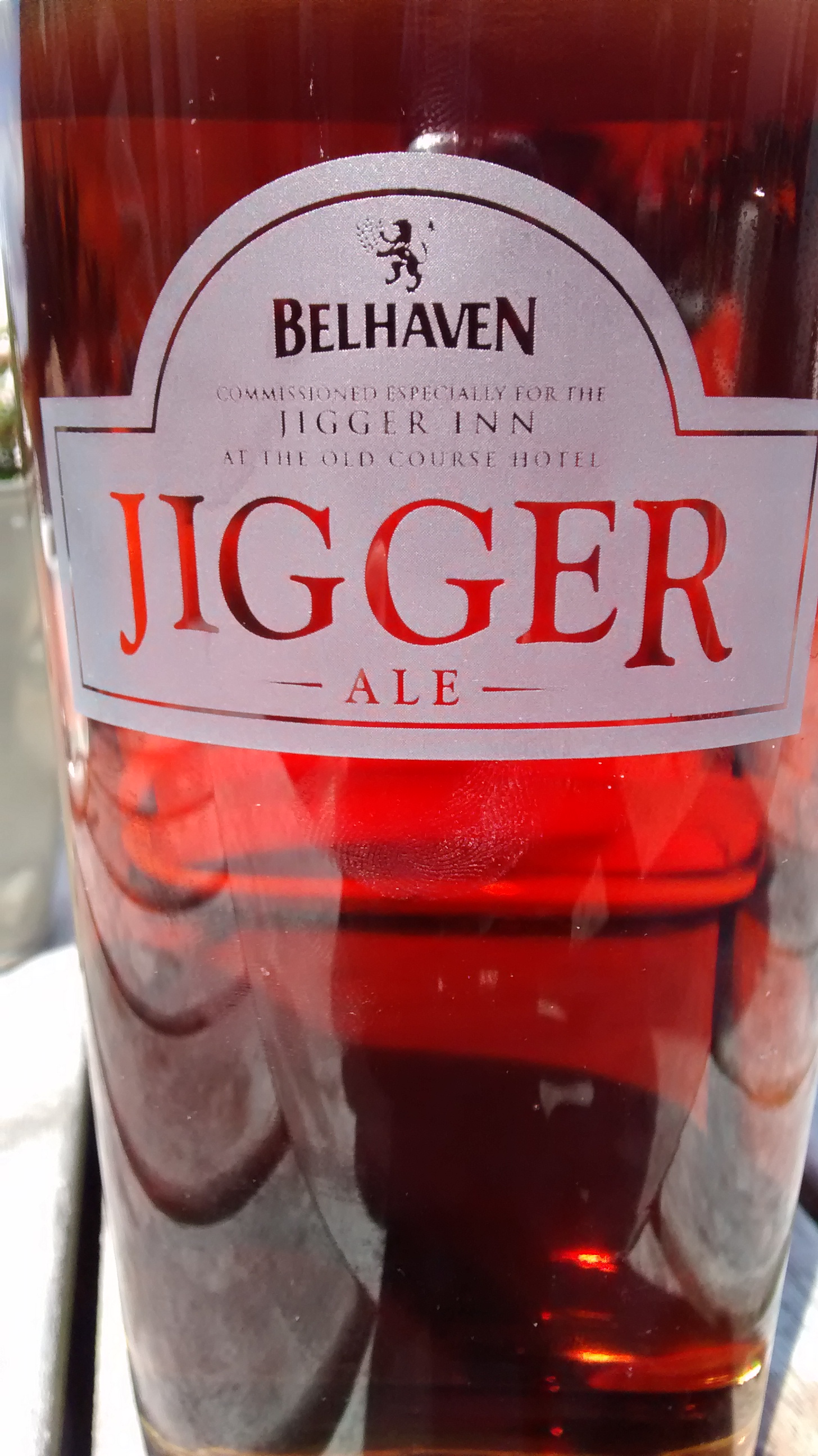
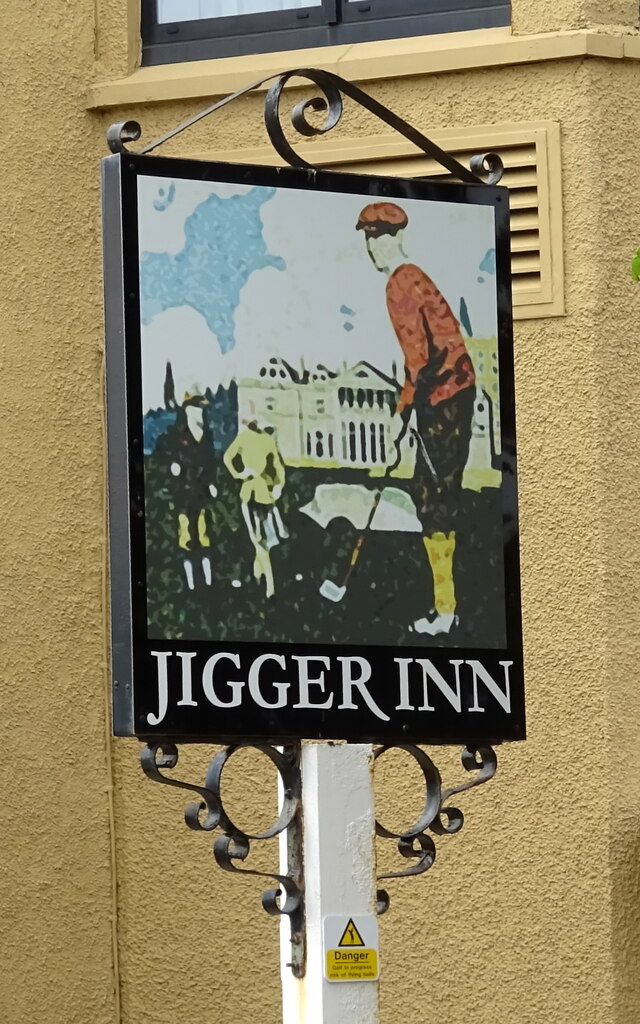
- The Jigger Inn and the Old Course Hotel in the background Jigger Ale is brewed for the Jigger Inn by the Belhaven Brewery The pub sign depicting golfers with the Royal and Ancient clubhouse in the background
- Former names: Stationmaster's lodge, St Andrews Links railway station

General information
- Location: Old Station Road, St Andrews, Scotland
- Coordinates: 56.34403°N 2.81083°W
- Opened: 1852
- Owner: Destination Kohler

Technical details
- Floor count: 2

The Jigger Inn is a pub which overlooks the 17th Road Hole on the Old Course in St Andrews, Fife, Scotland. Jigger Inn dates back to 1852 when it was the station master's lodge for the St Andrews Links railway station. The R&A has called it "Arguably the most famous 19th hole in the world", and Golf Monthly calls it "the most famous 19th hole in golf".

The Jigger Inn became part of the Old Course Hotel complex in 1974 when it was converted into a pub, although it has not changed much since it was originally constructed. In 2004 Herb Kohler bought the pub as part of the Old Course Hotel, Golf Resort & Spa. It is now operated by Destination Kohler, a subsidiary of the American Kohler Company.

A jigger golf club is an obsolete golf club that was a very low lofted iron club with a shortened shaft. A "jigger" is also a tool used for measuring out a jigger (1 1/2 US fluid ounces (44 mL)) of alcohol.

== Jigger Ale ==
The Jigger Inn has its own beer, called Jigger Ale. It was first produced by the Belhaven Brewery in 2010 exclusively for the pub. It is now available in the pub and also at the Horse & Plow at the American Club in Kohler, Wisconsin, USA.
