= Pittenweem railway station =

Disused railway station in Pittenweem, Fife

Pittenweem

General information
- Location: Pittenweem, Fife; Scotland
- Coordinates: 56.2186°N 2.7356°W
- Grid reference: NO544031
- Platforms: 1

Other information
- Status: Disused

History
- Original company: The Leven and East of Fife Railway
- Pre-grouping: North British Railway
- Post-grouping: LNER

Key dates
- 1 September 1863: Opened
- 1 January 1917: Closed to passengers
- 1 February 1919: Reopened
- 6 September 1965: Closed
Location

Pittenweem railway station served the village of Pittenweem, Fife, Scotland from 1863 to 1965 on the Fife Coast Railway.

== History ==
The station opened on 1 September 1863 by the Leven and East of Fife Railway. It closed to passengers on 1 January 1917 and reopened on 1 February 1919. It finally closed to both passengers and goods traffic on 6 September 1965.

Preceding station	Disused railways	Following station
Anstruther; Line and station closed	The Leven and East of Fife Railway	St. Monance; Line and station closed
