= Guardbridge railway station =

Disused railway station in Guardbridge, Fife

Guardbridge

General information
- Location: Guardbridge, Fife; Scotland
- Coordinates: 56.3596°N 2.8906°W
- Grid reference: NO450189
- Platforms: 1

Other information
- Status: Disused

History
- Original company: St Andrews Railway
- Pre-grouping: North British Railway
- Post-grouping: LNER

Key dates
- 1 July 1852: Opened
- 6 September 1965: Closed
Location

Guardbridge railway station served the village of Guardbridge, Fife, Scotland from 1852 to 1965 on The St. Andrews Railway.

== History ==
The station opened on 1 July 1852 by The St. Andrews Railway. To the south was the signal box, to the west was the goods yard and Seggie Brick and Tile Works and to the north was Guardbridge Paper Mill. This closed in 2008. The station closed to both passengers and goods traffic on 6 September 1965.

Preceding station	Disused railways	Following station
St Andrews (New); Line and station closed	The St. Andrews Railway	Leuchars (Old); Line and station closed
