= Stravithie railway station =

Disused railway station in Stravithie, Fife

Stravithie
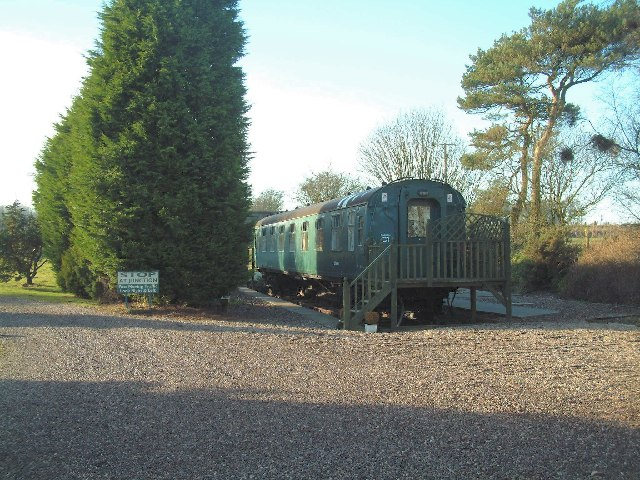
- The site of the station in 2006

General information
- Location: Stravithie, Fife; Scotland
- Coordinates: 56.3109°N 2.7577°W
- Grid reference: NO532134
- Platforms: 1; 2 (later added)

Other information
- Status: Disused

History
- Original company: Anstruther and St Andrews Railway
- Pre-grouping: North British Railway
- Post-grouping: LNER

Key dates
- 1 June 1887: Opened
- 22 September 1930: Closed
Location

Stravithie railway station served the hamlet of Stravithie, Fife, Scotland from 1887 to 1930 on the Anstruther and St Andrews Railway.

== History ==
The station opened on 1 June 1887 by the Anstruther and St Andrews Railway. It originally had one platform but another was later added in 1898 and the original signal box was replaced with one to the east. The goods yard was to the south. The signal box closed in 1926 and the station closed on 22 September 1930.

Preceding station	Disused railways	Following station
Mount Melville; Line and station closed	Anstruther and St Andrews Railway	Boarhills; Line and station closed
