= St Andrews Rail Link =

Proposed railway line in Fife, Scotland

Coordinates: 56.359°N 2.8885°W

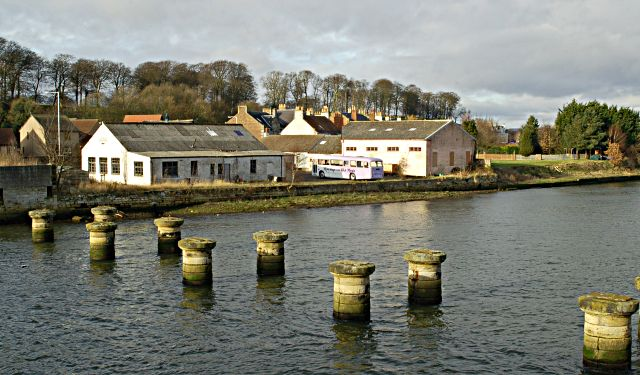
The former viaduct at Guardbridge. Dismantled.

The St Andrews Rail Link Campaign (StARLink Campaign) was established in 1989 with the aim of reconnecting Scottish town of St Andrews to the railway.

== History ==
The historical St Andrews Railway, which had connected St Andrews to the mainline via Leuchars Junction was closed on 6 January 1969.

Unlike the earlier closure of the Anstruther & St Andrews Railway in 1965, the St Andrews Railway was not recommended for closure in the (1963) Beeching Report. The closure, ordered four years after Beeching's departure in 1965, was ordered by Richard Marsh, Minister for Transport in the 1964-1970 (Labour) government of Prime Minister Harold Wilson, and whilst some Beeching closures did take place after the departure of Beeching in 1965, the St Andrews closure was not an instance of such.

The original reinstatement plan espoused by StARLink was simply a reestablishment of the historical Leuchars - St Andrews line but since the publication in 2012 of a report by Tata Steel Rail Consultancy StARLink now advocates an entirely new 21st-century layout with a twin-chord high-speed rail link travelling west and southwards via Cupar and northwards via Leuchars. StARLink has estimated that the railway could be reinstated for £76 million. A 2008 survey by StARLink of St Andrews residents and commuters found that 78% of those respondents who did not use buses would use the railway instead; the group had sent out 20,000 questionnaires in December 2007.

This line has been identified by the Campaign for Better Transport as a priority 2 candidate for reopening.
