= Dairsie railway station =

Disused railway station in Dairsie, Fife

Coordinates: 56.3388°N 2.9456°W

Dairsie

General information
- Location: Dairsie, Fife; Scotland
- Platforms: 2

Other information
- Status: Disused

History
- Original company: Edinburgh and Northern Railway
- Pre-grouping: North British Railway
- Post-grouping: LNER; British Railways (Scottish Region)

Key dates
- 17 May 1848: Opened
- 20 September 1954: Closed
Location

Dairsie railway station served the village of Dairsie, Fife, Scotland from 1848 to 1954 on the Edinburgh and Northern Railway.

== History ==
The station opened on 17 May 1848 by the Edinburgh and Northern Railway. To the south was Dairsie Castle and to the north was a loading bank. A signal box was north of the southbound platform. This closed in 1965, 11 years after the station which closed on 20 September 1954.

Preceding station	Historical railways	Following station
Leuchars; Line and station open	North British Railway; Edinburgh and Northern Railway	Cupar; Line and station open
