= Old Course Hotel =

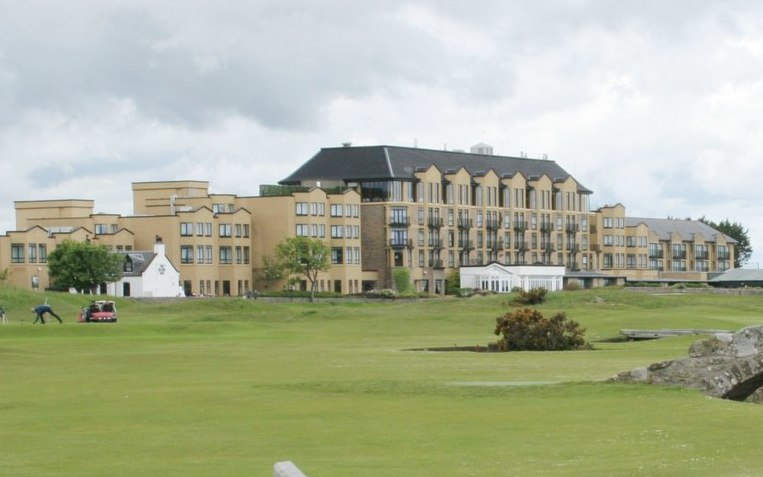
- The Old Course Hotel overlooking the Old Course
- Interactive map of the Old Course Hotel area
- Hotel chain: Kohler

General information
- Status: Open
- Type: Hotel
- Classification: 5 stars
- Location: St Andrews, Old Station Road, St Andrews, United Kingdom
- Coordinates: 56.34453°N 2.81138°W
- Opening: 1968
- Owner: Destination Kohler

Other information
- Number of rooms: 175
- Parking: Yes

Website
- Official website

The Old Course Hotel is a five-star golf resort hotel in St Andrews, Fife, Scotland. The hotel borders the Road Hole of The Old Course and has 175 rooms. Opened by British Transport Hotels in 1968 on the site of the former St Andrews railway station, it was acquired by Kohler Co. in 2004. The resort also includes the Kohler Waters Spa, which opened in 2006.

== History ==
The Old Course Hotel was opened by British Transport Hotels on 25 June 1968. The Railway and Canal Historical Society records it as the only new establishment opened by British Transport Hotels. The hotel was built on the site of the former St Andrews railway station. The former stationmaster's house was retained and became the Jigger Inn, which forms part of the hotel grounds.

By 2004, the hotel was owned by the Japanese company Kosaido Corporation. That year, Kohler Co. acquired the property from Kosaido Corporation in a transaction valued at €50.8 million. Contemporary reporting by HVS described the purchase price as approximately £35 million and identified the acquisition as Kohler's first overseas venture in the hospitality sector.

A major expansion and refurbishment programme began in January 2020, including plans to increase bedroom capacity and expand the hotel's conference and events facilities. The development was completed in 2021 and included a new upper-floor wing with 31 additional rooms, a fourth-floor penthouse suite and the Swilcan Loft restaurant, increasing the hotel's total accommodation to 175 rooms.

== Golf ==
The Old Course Hotel stands beside the 17th hole of the Old Course at St Andrews, known as the Road Hole. The tee shot on the 17th requires players to drive over or around the corner of the hotel to reach the fairway.

The Duke's Course, an inland golf course near St Andrews, opened in 1995 and was originally designed by five-time Open Championship winner Peter Thomson. Kohler Co. acquired both the Old Course Hotel and The Duke's Course in 2004 and commissioned American golf course architect Tim Liddy to redesign the course.

In January 2026, St Andrews Links Trust took over management of the course under a long-term lease. The course was renamed the Craigtoun Course and became the eighth course managed by the Links Trust.

== Kohler Waters Spa ==
Opened in 2006, the spa was the first Kohler Waters Spa to be established outside the United States. The spa has a particular focus on hydrotherapy.

The spa underwent an £8 million refurbishment in 2017–18. Following the redevelopment, the facility covered approximately 25,000 square feet (2,300 m^{2}) and included expanded hydrotherapy facilities. A further five-month renovation was completed in September 2025, incorporating an upgraded hydrotherapy suite and new thermal facilities.

== Gallery ==
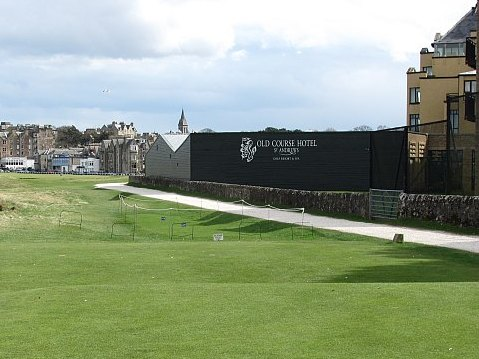
The hotel obstructs the 17th (The Road Hole) fairway on the Old Course. Previously they were railway sheds.

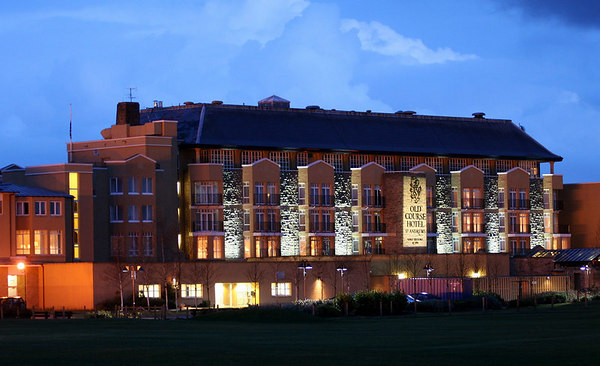
The Old Course Hotel at night

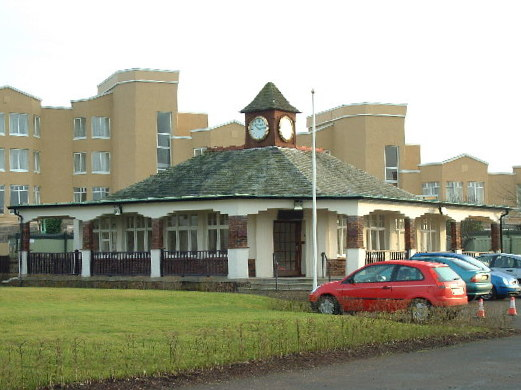
The Old Starter's Box. Previously it was a golf course starter's box

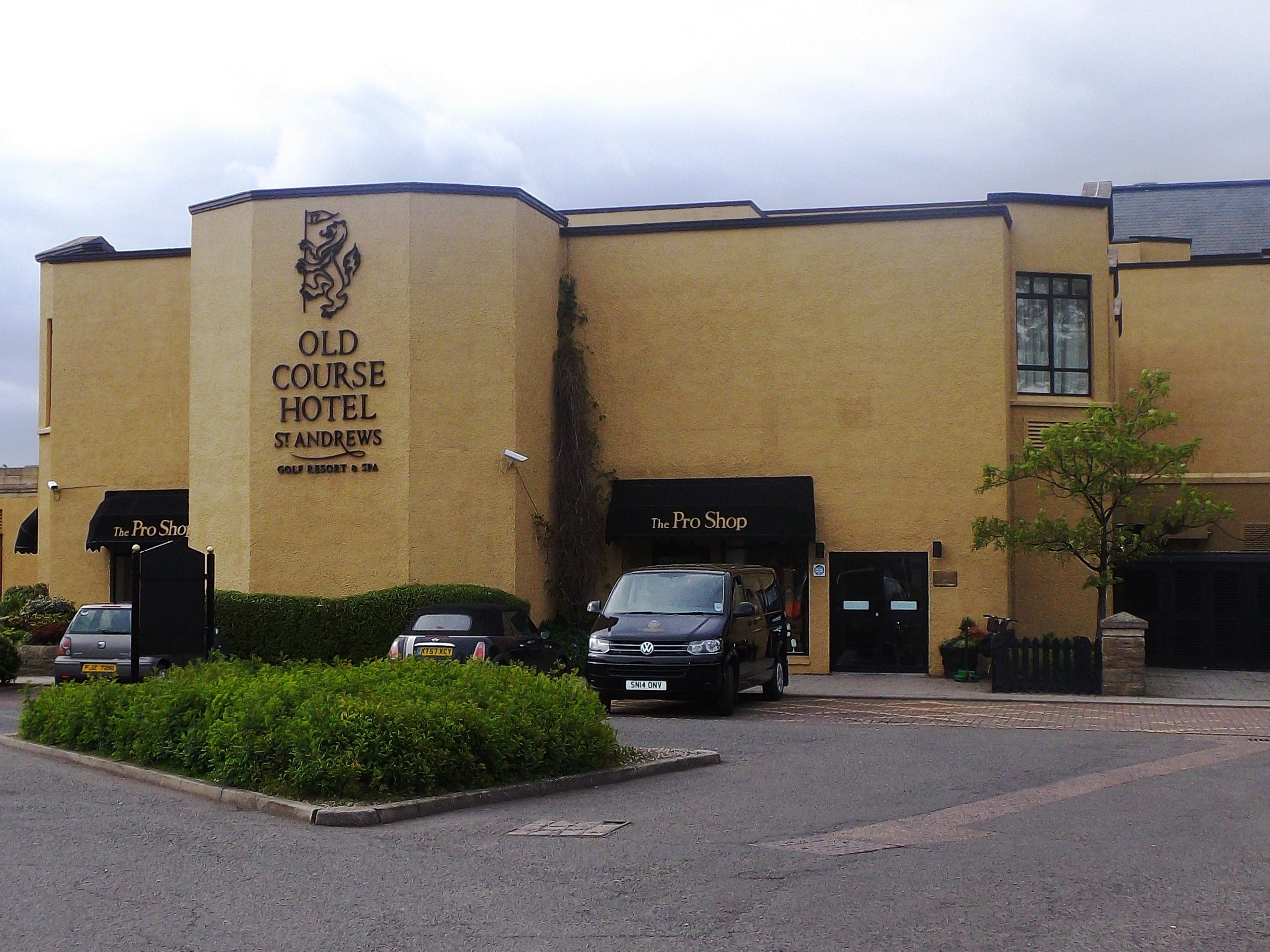
The Pro Shop at the Old Course Hotel

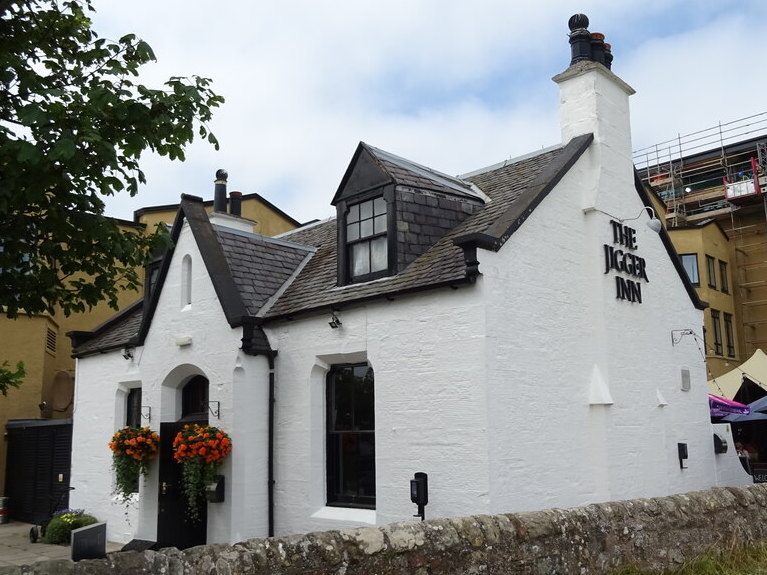
The Jigger Inn
