= Crail railway station =

Disused railway station in Crail, Fife

Crail
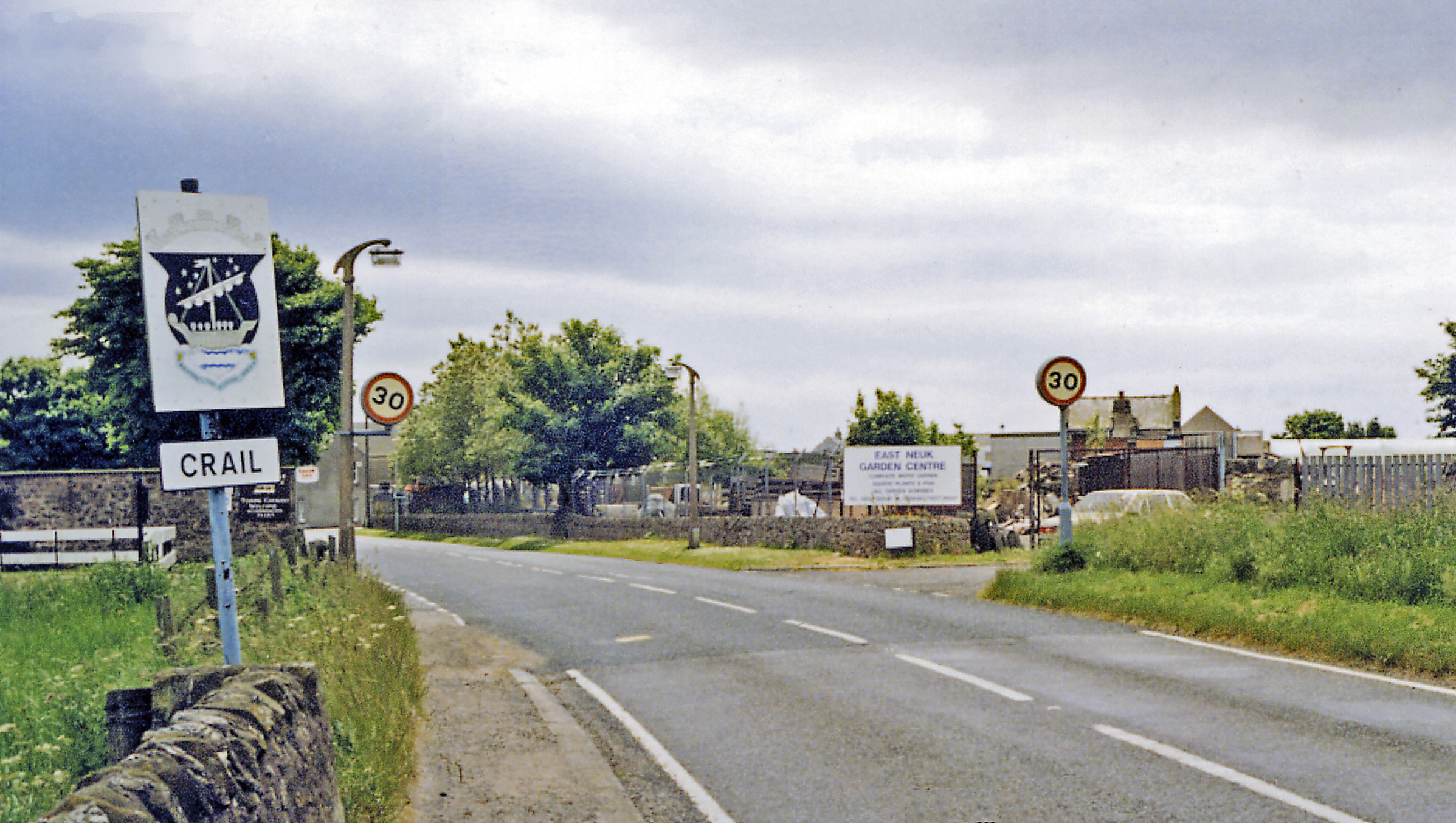
- The site of the station, looking southwest, in 1988

General information
- Location: Crail, Fife; Scotland
- Coordinates: 56.2624°N 2.6325°W
- Grid reference: NO609079
- Platforms: 2

Other information
- Status: Disused

History
- Original company: Anstruther and St Andrews Railway
- Pre-grouping: North British Railway
- Post-grouping: LNER

Key dates
- 1 September 1883: Opened
- 6 September 1965: Closed to passengers
- 18 November 1966: Closed to goods
Location

Crail railway station served the burgh of Crail, Fife, Scotland from 1883 to 1966 on the Fife Coast Railway.

== History ==
The station opened on 1 September 1883 by the North British Railway. It closed to passengers on 6 September 1965 and closed to goods on 18 November 1966.

| Preceding station | Disused railways | Following station |
|---|---|---|
| Kingsbarns; Line and station closed | Fife Coast Railway | Anstruther; Line and station closed |
