= St Andrews (New) railway station =

Disused railway station in St Andrews, Fife

St Andrews

General information
- Location: St Andrews, Fife; Scotland
- Coordinates: 56.3404°N 2.8038°W
- Grid reference: NO504167
- Platforms: 1

Other information
- Status: Disused

History
- Original company: North British Railway
- Pre-grouping: North British Railway
- Post-grouping: LNER; British Rail (Scottish Region)

Key dates
- 1 June 1887: Opened
- 6 January 1969: Closed
Location

St Andrews railway station was the second station to be built in the town of St Andrews, Fife, Scotland. The station, which was in service from 1887 to 1969, was built by the St Andrews Railway and the Anstruther and St Andrews Railway.

== History ==
The station opened on 1 June 1887 by the North British Railway, replacing the first station (which became a goods yard and depot). Although built to a two-track standard, the railway only had one line. The station, which was built within a stone-walled cutting on the edge of the town, had a side and island platforms on either side of the single track, and a side bay with a siding in place of a second through line. Rail traffic was controlled by a signal box at the western end of the stone-walled cutting.

In 1965, the line south of the town, which had been the Anstruther and St Andrews Railway, was closed, making St Andrews the terminus of the line for services from Leuchars railway station on the Edinburgh–Dundee line. The signal box closed in 1967. The station, along with the entire line, closed on 6 January 1969. The site, which has retained the walls of the stone cutting, is now used for onroad parking.

Preceding station	Disused railways	Following station
St Andrews (Old); Line and station closed	St Andrews Railway	Terminus
Terminus	Anstruther and St Andrews Railway	Mount Melville; Line and station closed
