= Kilconquhar railway station =

Disused railway station in Kilconquhar, Fife

Kilconquhar

General information
- Location: Kilconquhar, Fife; Scotland
- Coordinates: 56.2036°N 2.8415°W
- Grid reference: NO478015
- Platforms: 1

Other information
- Status: Disused

History
- Original company: Leven and East of Fife Railway
- Pre-grouping: North British Railway
- Post-grouping: LNER; British Rail (Scottish Region)

Key dates
- 11 August 1857: Opened
- 6 September 1965: Closed
Location

Kilconquhar railway station served the village of Kilconquhar, Fife, Scotland from 1857 to 1965 on the Leven and East of Fife Railway.

== History ==
The station opened on 11 August 1857 by the Leven and East of Fife Railway. To the northwest was a goods yard with a siding. The signal box, which opened in 1907, was on the platform and it closed in 1962. The station closed on 6 September 1965.

Preceding station	Historical railways	Following station
Elie; Line and station closed	North British Railway; The Leven and East of Fife Railway	Largo; Line and station closed
