= Golf Monthly =

Golf magazine

- Cover of the December 2024 issue
- Editor: Neil Tappin
- Categories: Golf
- Frequency: Monthly
- Circulation: 26,818 average monthly circulation for 2022
- Publisher: Future plc
- Founded: 1911
- First issue: 1911
- Company: Future PLC
- Country: United Kingdom
- Based in: London, Paddington
- Language: English
- Website: Golf Monthly

Golf Monthly is a monthly golfing magazine published by Future plc and based in Paddington in London. It publishes 13 issues a year and has a popular website, golfmonthly.com. The magazine's editor is Michael Harris. It is known for being the world's oldest golf magazine and its first editor was two-time Open Championship winner Harold Hilton who won the Open Championship in 1892 and 1897 and three Amateur Championships (1900/1901/1911) and one US Amateur Championship (1911).

The Golf Monthly YouTube channel is a popular channel on the website with over 6 million views a year. The brand creates much content across its print magazine, web articles and video reviews and instruction.

== Overview ==
Golf Monthly publishes tips, drills, and advice provided by UK's Top 50 coaches, and offers tour details that help the players to better their performance. The magazine presents data on gear and kit. For the travelling golfer, the magazine assigns special pages with information and suggestions as to where to play and find the best accommodation in and outside of UK.

Publishing since 1911, the magazine focuses in highlighting both domestic and international golf events providing original reports, golf gear/kit tests, updates on new arrivals and interviews and profiles of top professional golfers.

The brand was formerly owned by IPC Media a publisher that was renamed to become Time Inc. and then TI Media. Future PLC bought TI Media in April 2020.

Alison Root was announced as the brand's first Women's Golf Editor in September 2022.

Some of the famous names that have been the brand's playing editor include tour pro Eddie Pepperell, 2010 US Open Winner Graeme McDowell and Ryder Cup star Chris Wood.

== Top 100 Courses UK & Ireland ==
Golf Monthly has published its biennial list of the Top 100 Golf Courses UK & Ireland since 2005.

The Number 1 Golf Course in the UK & Ireland
| Year | Course Ranked Number 1 | Country |
|---|---|---|
| 2005/06 | St Andrews Old Course | Scotland |
| 2007/08 | Trump Turnberry Resort - Ailsa Course | Scotland |
| 2009/10 | Muirfield - The Honourable Company Of Edinburgh Golfers | Scotland |
| 2011/12 | Muirfield - The Honourable Company Of Edinburgh Golfers | Scotland |
| 2013/14 | Muirfield - The Honourable Company Of Edinburgh Golfers | Scotland |
| 2015/16 | Muirfield - The Honourable Company Of Edinburgh Golfers | Scotland |
| 2017/18 | Trump Turnberry Resort - Ailsa Course | Scotland |
| 2019/20 | Trump Turnberry Resort - Ailsa Course | Scotland |
| 2021/22 | Royal County Down | Northern Ireland |

=== Top 100 Course Criteria ===
There are five broad categories, weighted for importance. Quality of test and design (35%), conditioning and presentation (30%), visual appeal both internally and externally (15%), the club’s facilities (10%) and the visitor experience (10%). Because this is still a subjective process, they also look closely at the written reports. A few years ago, based on strong reader feedback, they decided to exclude all courses where you cannot pay a regular green fee.

== Gear Review Process ==
Golf Monthly has been creating impartial content since they were first published in 1911.

The Golf Monthly's reviews and buyers guides is built upon testing as well as the knowledge and experience of the test team that is known for delivering the key points you want to know.

The brand's commitments are:

- The products reviewed are tested by good club golfers
- If they say they have reviewed a product, that means they've used it out on the golf course and hit it on a launch monitor where applicable
- Manufacturers can't pay for a good review
- They will always endeavour to use the latest and best equipment to assess performance.
