= Anstruther railway station =

Disused railway station in Anstruther, Fife

Anstruther

General information
- Location: Anstruther, Fife; Scotland
- Coordinates: 56.2233°N 2.7069°W
- Platforms: 2

Other information
- Status: Disused

History
- Original company: Leven and East of Fife Railway
- Pre-grouping: North British Railway
- Post-grouping: London and North Eastern Railway

Key dates
- 1 September 1863: Station opens
- 1 September 1883: Station moved when line extended
- 6 September 1965: Station closes
Location

Anstruther railway station served the village of Anstruther, Fife, in Scotland. Served by the Leven and East of Fife Railway it was opened in 1863.

== History ==
First station was opened by the Leven and East of Fife Railway in 1863 and was resited in 1883. In 1887, a separate company extended the line to St Andrews and 10 years later it became part of the North British Railway. From 1923 it became part of the London and North Eastern Railway. The line then passed on to the Scottish Region of British Railways on nationalisation in 1948. The station was then closed by the British Railways Board in 1965.

Preceding station	Historical railways	Following station
Pittenweem	North British Railway; Leven and East of Fife Railway	Crail

== Sources ==
- Butt, R. V. J. (October 1995). The Directory of Railway Stations: details every public and private passenger station, halt, platform and stopping place, past and present (1st ed.). Sparkford: Patrick Stephens Ltd. ISBN 978-1-85260-508-7. OCLC 60251199. OL 11956311M.
- Hajducki, Andrew; Jodeluk, Michael; Simpson, Alan (2009). Anstruther & St Andrews Railway. Oakwood Press. ISBN 978-0-85361-687-0.
- Jowett, Alan (March 1989). Jowett's Railway Atlas of Great Britain and Ireland: From Pre-Grouping to the Present Day (1st ed.). Sparkford: Patrick Stephens Ltd. ISBN 978-1-85260-086-0. OCLC 22311137.
- Jowett, Alan (2000). Jowett's Nationalised Railway Atlas (1st ed.). Penryn, Cornwall: Atlantic Transport Publishers. ISBN 978-0-906899-99-1. OCLC 228266687.
