= List of listed buildings in St Andrews, Fife =

This is a list of listed buildings in the parish of St Andrews in Fife, Scotland.

== List ==
Name	Location	Date listed	Grid ref. (Note: Sometimes known as OSGB36, the grid reference (where provided) is based on the British national grid reference system used by the Ordnance Survey. • "Guide to National Grid". Ordnance Survey. • "Get-a-map". Ordnance Survey.)	Geo-coordinates	Notes	LB number (Note: Historic Environment Scotland assign a unique alphanumeric identifier to each designated site in Scotland, for listed buildings this always begins with "LB", for example "LB12345".)	Image
112 South Street (First House In Close), Including Walled Courtyard				56°20′20″N 2°47′48″W	Category C(S)	44609	Upload Photo
2-10 Greyfriars Garden				56°20′27″N 2°47′55″W	Category B	40895	Upload another image
12-16 Greyfriars Garden And 150 North Street				56°20′30″N 2°47′55″W	Category B	40897	Upload another image
1-14 Hope Street				56°20′28″N 2°48′04″W	Category B	40902	Upload Photo
1-13 Abbotsford Crescent, Abbotsford House And Macintosh Hall				56°20′31″N 2°48′06″W	Category B	40904	Upload Photo
1-6 Alexandra Place, (Old Station Hotel)				56°20′24″N 2°48′04″W	Category B	40908	Upload Photo
Kinburn House, Doubledykes Road				56°20′23″N 2°48′19″W	Category B	40917	Upload Photo
Lade Braes, Law Mill Over Kinness Burn				56°19′56″N 2°49′25″W	Category C(S)	40931	Upload Photo
Bogward Dovecot				56°19′48″N 2°49′24″W	Category A	40932	Upload another image See more images
104 And 106 Hepburn Gardens, Abbot's Inch And Fulwood House (Formerly Priory Acres), Including Boundary Walls And Gatepiers				56°19′59″N 2°49′06″W	Category B	40936	Upload Photo
1-8 Playfair Terrace				56°20′32″N 2°48′02″W	Category B	40806	Upload Photo
5-7 Pilmour Place				56°20′32″N 2°48′06″W	Category B	40808	Upload Photo
1-8 St. Gregory's East Scores And Gregory's Lane				56°20′27″N 2°47′18″W	Category C(S)	40812	Upload Photo
The Swallowgate, The Scores				56°20′33″N 2°47′43″W	Category B	40822	Upload Photo
5 & 5A Gillespie Terrace, The Scores				56°20′34″N 2°48′01″W	Category C(S)	40828	Upload Photo
4-21 Queen's Gardens				56°20′19″N 2°47′43″W	Category C(S)	40842	Upload Photo
St. Regulus Hall, Queen's Gardens And Queen's Terrace				56°20′14″N 2°47′43″W	Category C(S)	40843	Upload Photo
16, 18 South Castle Street				56°20′26″N 2°47′28″W	Category C(S)	40849	Upload Photo
29 North Castle Street				56°20′27″N 2°47′26″W	Category C(S)	40852	Upload Photo
35 - 39 North Castle Street				56°20′28″N 2°47′25″W	Category B	40855	Upload Photo
45-49 North Castle Street				56°20′29″N 2°47′24″W	Category C(S)	40858	Upload Photo
5 College Street				56°20′26″N 2°47′42″W	Category C(S)	40866	Upload Photo
15 College Street				56°20′27″N 2°47′42″W	Category B	40869	Upload Photo
10 College Street				56°20′27″N 2°47′43″W	Category C(S)	40873	Upload Photo
25, 27 Church Street				56°20′23″N 2°47′41″W	Category C(S)	40880	Upload Photo
134-138 South Street				56°20′19″N 2°47′57″W	Category C(S)	40710	Upload Photo
142-148 South Street, Including Garden Walls				56°20′19″N 2°47′58″W	Category B	40713	Upload Photo
150-154 South Street, Including Garden Walls Of Lang Rig				56°20′19″N 2°47′58″W	Category C(S)	40716	Upload Photo
160, 162 South Street				56°20′19″N 2°48′00″W	Category C(S)	40719	Upload Photo
96, 98 Market Street				56°20′25″N 2°47′47″W	Category C(S)	40748	Upload Photo
Bee-Boles, 93 Market Street				56°20′26″N 2°47′46″W	Category B	40749	Upload Photo
Former West Infant School, Market Street				56°20′27″N 2°47′59″W	Category C(S)	40750	Upload Photo
6 St. Mary's Place				56°20′24″N 2°48′01″W	Category C(S)	40754	Upload Photo
Dean's Court, North Street (Including Walls Of Courtyard And Of Garden To North Street.)				56°20′25″N 2°47′22″W	Category A	40756	Upload Photo
37 North Street				56°20′27″N 2°47′28″W	Category C(S)	40764	Upload Photo
St Salvator's ChapelSt. Salvator's Chapel, Tower And Hebdomadar's Building				56°20′29″N 2°47′41″W	Category A	40771	Upload another image
United College Of St Salvator And St Leonard Including Boundary Walls To Butts Wynd And The Scores				56°20′29″N 2°47′39″W	Category B	40772	Upload Photo
28-32 North Street				56°20′26″N 2°47′28″W	Category B	40780	Upload Photo
34 North Street				56°20′26″N 2°47′29″W	Category C(S)	40781	Upload Photo
70 North Street				56°20′27″N 2°47′37″W	Category B	40793	Upload Photo
112-118 North Street				56°20′29″N 2°47′48″W	Category C(S)	40798	Upload Photo
17 South Street				56°20′23″N 2°47′26″W	Category B	40606	Upload Photo
23, 25 South Street				56°20′23″N 2°47′28″W	Category B	40608	Upload Photo
67, 69 South Street				56°20′23″N 2°47′37″W	Category A	40623	Upload Photo
109-121 South Street Albert Buildings				56°20′22″N 2°47′46″W	Category B	40634	Upload Photo
141 South Street Within Burgher Close				56°20′22″N 2°47′52″W	Category B	40640	Upload Photo
175 South Street				56°20′21″N 2°47′57″W	Category C(S)	40650	Upload Photo
197, 199 South Street				56°20′20″N 2°47′59″W	Category C(S)	40655	Upload Photo
Warehouse Within Court At Rear Of 203 South Street				56°20′21″N 2°48′01″W	Category C(S)	40657	Upload Photo
St Leonard's College, Pend Arch				56°20′21″N 2°47′23″W	Category B	40667	Upload Photo
58 South Street, With Garden Wall Of Lang Rig				56°20′22″N 2°47′35″W	Category B	40683	Upload Photo
University Library 1889-90 Extension				56°20′19″N 2°47′38″W	Category B	40688	Upload Photo
68-78 South Street				56°20′21″N 2°47′43″W	Category B	40694	Upload Photo
96-100 South Street				56°20′21″N 2°47′46″W	Category C(S)	40696	Upload Photo
102-104 South Street				56°20′20″N 2°47′46″W	Category B	40697	Upload Photo
16, 17, 18 And 18A Pilmour Links Including Boundary Walls				56°20′33″N 2°48′16″W	Category C(S)	45917	Upload Photo
12 The Links, St Rule Club With Boundary Wall And Railings				56°20′34″N 2°48′12″W	Category C(S)	46274	Upload Photo
2-4 (Even Nos) Golf Place, Auchterlonie's, And 1 Pilmour Links, Kinloch Cottage				56°20′32″N 2°48′09″W	Category C(S)	46276	Upload Photo
12-24 (Even Nos) Golf Place				56°20′34″N 2°48′09″W	Category C(S)	46277	Upload Photo
6, 7 And 8 Balfour Place Including Boundary Walls				56°20′13″N 2°47′01″W	Category C(S)	50155	Upload Photo
Kennedy Gardens, Rathelpie (Former Free Church Manse) Including Boundary Walls				56°20′21″N 2°48′24″W	Category C(S)	50925	Upload Photo
Kilrymont Road, Madras College, Kilrymont Road Building Including Sports Hall And Boundary Walls And Railings				56°19′47″N 2°47′28″W	Category B	50926	Upload Photo
14-32 Bell Street				56°20′23″N 2°47′56″W	Category C(S)	40900	Upload Photo
Hepburn Gardens And Donaldson Gardens, St Leonard's Parish Church (Church Of Scotland) Including Church Hall, Boundary Walls And Gatepiers				56°20′13″N 2°48′35″W	Category B	40925	Upload another image
4-7 Ellice Place				56°20′31″N 2°47′58″W	Category C(S)	40805	Upload Photo
1-10 Gibson Place				56°20′34″N 2°48′20″W	Category C(S)	40809	Upload Photo
University House, (Principal's Residence), The Scores				56°20′34″N 2°47′40″W	Category B	40815	Upload Photo
Bandstand, The Scores				56°20′37″N 2°48′04″W	Category B	40818	Upload Photo
St. Nicholas House, Abbey Walk				56°20′14″N 2°47′26″W	Category B	40838	Upload Photo
Burgh Offices, Queen's Gardens (Former Commercial Bank)				56°20′20″N 2°47′43″W	Category B	40840	Upload Photo
41 North Castle Street				56°20′28″N 2°47′25″W	Category B	40856	Upload Photo
All Saint's Episcopal Church And Ancillary Buildings, North Castle Street				56°20′28″N 2°47′27″W	Category A	40861	Upload another image
11 Union Street				56°20′27″N 2°47′37″W	Category C(S)	40865	Upload Photo
6 College Street				56°20′27″N 2°47′43″W	Category C(S)	40871	Upload Photo
Madras College Schoolhouse West				56°20′19″N 2°47′55″W	Category B	40705	Upload another image
South Street 2-5 And 7 Rose Lane				56°20′17″N 2°47′55″W	Category C(S)	40708	Upload Photo
1-4 Louden's Close, South Street, Including Garden Walls Of Lang Rig				56°20′18″N 2°47′58″W	Category B	40714	Upload Photo
23 Market Street				56°20′25″N 2°47′33″W	Category B	40728	Upload Photo
25 Market Street				56°20′25″N 2°47′34″W	Category C(S)	40729	Upload Photo
49-51 Market Street				56°20′26″N 2°47′38″W	Category B	40730	Upload Photo
80 Market Street And 2-4 Church Street				56°20′25″N 2°47′43″W	Category C(S)	40745	Upload Photo
3 St. Mary's Place				56°20′24″N 2°47′58″W	Category B	40755	Upload Photo
1 North Street				56°20′26″N 2°47′20″W	Category B	40757	Upload Photo
St. Salvator's Hall North Street And The Scores, Including Boundary Wall To The Scores With Remains Of Swallow Port At East				56°20′31″N 2°47′32″W	Category B	40766	Upload Photo
65 North Street				56°20′28″N 2°47′34″W	Category C(S)	40769	Upload Photo
79-83 North Street				56°20′29″N 2°47′43″W	Category B	40774	Upload Photo
38-44 North Street				56°20′26″N 2°47′30″W	Category C(S)	40783	Upload Photo
82 North Street And 19 College Street				56°20′28″N 2°47′42″W	Category B	40796	Upload Photo
84, 86 North Street And 20-24 College Street				56°20′28″N 2°47′43″W	Category B	40797	Upload Photo
7, (9) South Street				56°20′24″N 2°47′24″W	Category B	40603	Upload Photo
133-139 South Street				56°20′21″N 2°47′50″W	Category B	40639	Upload Photo
153, 155 South Street				56°20′21″N 2°47′52″W	Category C(S)	40644	Upload Photo
161-3 South Street And 45 Bell Street				56°20′21″N 2°47′54″W	Category C(S)	40647	Upload Photo
St Leonard's Chapel				56°20′21″N 2°47′23″W	Category A	40666	Upload Photo
St. Leonard's, Oliphant Memorial Dial				56°20′19″N 2°47′14″W	Category B	40671	Upload Photo
Town Hall, South Street And Queen's Gardens				56°20′21″N 2°47′43″W	Category B	40695	Upload another image
116 South Street				56°20′20″N 2°47′48″W	Category C(S)	40701	Upload Photo
3 Windmill Road, Cryanreuch Including Gate Piers And Boundary Walls				56°20′30″N 2°48′18″W	Category C(S)	49603	Upload Photo
The Links, St Andrews Woollen Mill				56°20′34″N 2°48′11″W	Category C(S)	45570	Upload Photo
8, 9, 10, 11 Logie's Lane				56°20′24″N 2°47′47″W	Category C(S)	40889	Upload Photo
1 Greyfriars Garden And Chestney House, 149 Market Street				56°20′26″N 2°47′55″W	Category B	40894	Upload another image
5-33 Bell Street				56°20′23″N 2°47′54″W	Category C(S)	40899	Upload Photo
32, 34 Bell Street And 165, 167 South Street				56°20′21″N 2°47′55″W	Category B	40901	Upload Photo
29 Kinnessburn Road				56°20′11″N 2°47′57″W	Category C(S)	40916	Upload Photo
102 Hepburn Gardens, West House Including Boundary Walls And Gatepiers				56°19′59″N 2°49′04″W	Category B	40928	Upload Photo
North Street, K6 Telephone Kiosk				56°20′28″N 2°47′33″W	Category B	40934	Upload Photo
90 Market Street				56°20′25″N 2°47′45″W	Category B	40938	Upload Photo
St. James Rc Church, The Scores				56°20′35″N 2°47′51″W	Category B	40816	Upload another image
The Scores, Castlecliffe House, Garden Wall And Gatepiers				56°20′33″N 2°47′29″W	Category B	40819	Upload Photo
10 Abbey Street				56°20′21″N 2°47′29″W	Category C(S)	40832	Upload Photo
16, 18 Greenside Place				56°20′15″N 2°47′30″W	Category C(S)	40834	Upload Photo
Abbey Cottage, Abbey Walk				56°20′13″N 2°47′06″W	Category B	40839	Upload Photo
Castlegate, 51 North Castle Street				56°20′29″N 2°47′24″W	Category C(S)	40859	Upload Photo
9 Union Street				56°20′27″N 2°47′38″W	Category B	40864	Upload Photo
17 College Street				56°20′28″N 2°47′42″W	Category C(S)	40870	Upload Photo
7, 9 Church Street				56°20′24″N 2°47′42″W	Category C(S)	40874	Upload Photo
15, 17 Church Street				56°20′24″N 2°47′42″W	Category C(S)	40877	Upload Photo
21, 23 Church Street				56°20′23″N 2°47′41″W	Category C(S)	40879	Upload Photo
29 Church Street				56°20′23″N 2°47′42″W	Category C(S)	40881	Upload Photo
Market Place, Melville Memorial Fountain				56°20′25″N 2°47′44″W	Category B	40724	Upload Photo
8 Market Street				56°20′25″N 2°47′30″W	Category B	40736	Upload Photo
10-14 Market Street				56°20′25″N 2°47′31″W	Category C(S)	40737	Upload Photo
50-54 Market Street				56°20′25″N 2°47′38″W	Category C(S)	40738	Upload Photo
86-88 Market Street				56°20′25″N 2°47′45″W	Category B	40746	Upload Photo
Star Hotel, 92, 94 Market Street				56°20′25″N 2°47′46″W	Category C(S)	40747	Upload Photo
15, 17 North Street				56°20′26″N 2°47′23″W	Category C(S)	40758	Upload Photo
71 North Street				56°20′29″N 2°47′38″W	Category A	40770	Upload Photo
Fine Arts Buildings, 89, 91, 93 North Street				56°20′29″N 2°47′46″W	Category B	40775	Upload Photo
12, 16 North Street,				56°20′26″N 2°47′25″W	Category B	40776	Upload Photo
72 North Street, Including Garden Wall To Union Street				56°20′27″N 2°47′38″W	Category B	40794	Upload Photo
Bellrock Tavern, (Mrs Sekaleka) Shorehead				56°20′23″N 2°47′03″W	Category B	40597	Upload Photo
11, 13 South Street				56°20′24″N 2°47′25″W	Category B	40604	Upload Photo
33-37 South Street				56°20′23″N 2°47′30″W	Category C(S)	40612	Upload Photo
43 South Street				56°20′23″N 2°47′32″W	Category B	40614	Upload Photo
55, 57 South Street				56°20′23″N 2°47′35″W	Category C(S)	40619	Upload Photo
65 South Street				56°20′23″N 2°47′36″W	Category B	40622	Upload Photo
101-103 South Street				56°20′23″N 2°47′41″W	Category C(S)	40631	Upload Photo
189, 191 South Street				56°20′21″N 2°47′58″W	Category C(S)	40653	Upload Photo
201 South Street				56°20′20″N 2°48′00″W	Category C(S)	40656	Upload Photo
209 South Street				56°20′20″N 2°48′02″W	Category C(S)	40659	Upload Photo
24 South Street				56°20′22″N 2°47′27″W	Category B	40673	Upload Photo
40 (A-H), 42 South Street, South Court				56°20′21″N 2°47′31″W	Category A	40676	Upload Photo
56 South Street, With Garden Walls Of Lang Rig				56°20′22″N 2°47′35″W	Category B	40682	Upload Photo
St Mary's Place, Inchcape House				56°20′24″N 2°47′59″W	Category B	46259	Upload Photo
7 Pilmour Links With Boundary Walls, Gate And Railings				56°20′33″N 2°48′12″W	Category C(S)	46272	Upload Photo
4 And 5 Balfour Place				56°20′14″N 2°47′02″W	Category C(S)	50156	Upload Photo
25 St Mary's Street Including Garden And Boundary Walls				56°20′06″N 2°47′01″W	Category C(S)	50927	Upload Photo
117 North Street, The New Picture House				56°20′30″N 2°47′52″W	Category B	51110	Upload another image
10 Church Street Including 2 Church Square Extension				56°20′24″N 2°47′44″W	Category C(S)	40883	Upload Photo
Old House, Now Public Convenience, City Road				56°20′20″N 2°48′03″W	Category C(S)	40905	Upload Photo
Gibson House, Argyle Street				56°20′21″N 2°48′06″W	Category B	40909	Upload another image
2 Hepburn Gardens Including Boundary Walls				56°20′17″N 2°48′22″W	Category C(S)	40922	Upload Photo
1-4 Pilmour Place				56°20′32″N 2°48′04″W	Category B	40807	Upload Photo
Edgecliffe, The Scores				56°20′34″N 2°47′37″W	Category B	40814	Upload Photo
Golfers' Bridge Across The Swilken Burn				56°20′35″N 2°48′25″W	Category B	40821	Upload Photo
3 Gillespie Terrace, The Scores				56°20′34″N 2°48′02″W	Category C(S)	40826	Upload Photo
4 Gillespie Terrace, The Scores				56°20′34″N 2°48′01″W	Category C(S)	40827	Upload Photo
3 Balfour Place				56°20′13″N 2°47′02″W	Category C(S)	40830	Upload Photo
13-15 South Castle Street				56°20′25″N 2°47′27″W	Category B	40847	Upload Photo
Castlemount, North Castle Street				56°20′30″N 2°47′26″W	Category C(S)	40860	Upload Photo
7, 9 College Street				56°20′27″N 2°47′42″W	Category C(S)	40867	Upload Photo
132 South Street And 1 Rose Lane				56°20′20″N 2°47′56″W	Category C(S)	40709	Upload Photo
Alison's Close At 140 South Street				56°20′19″N 2°47′57″W	Category C(S)	40712	Upload Photo
Ivy Cottage, Louden's Close, Including Garden Walls Of Lang Rig				56°20′18″N 2°47′57″W	Category C(S)	40715	Upload Photo
53 Market Street And Shop, 1 Union Street				56°20′26″N 2°47′38″W	Category B	40731	Upload Photo
70-72 Market Street				56°20′24″N 2°47′41″W	Category C(S)	40743	Upload Photo
St. Salvator's Hall Sundial, North Street And The Scores				56°20′31″N 2°47′33″W	Category B	40767	Upload Photo
College Gate, North Street				56°20′28″N 2°47′36″W	Category B	40768	Upload Photo
62, 64 North Street				56°20′27″N 2°47′35″W	Category C(S)	40790	Upload Photo
66 North Street				56°20′27″N 2°47′36″W	Category C(S)	40791	Upload Photo
Martyrs' Church And Halls, North Street				56°20′28″N 2°47′39″W	Category B	40795	Upload Photo
120 North Street				56°20′29″N 2°47′49″W	Category B	40799	Upload Photo
St Andrews Harbour				56°20′22″N 2°47′01″W	Category A	40596	Upload another image See more images
27 South Street				56°20′23″N 2°47′29″W	Category C(S)	40609	Upload Photo
71 South Street				56°20′23″N 2°47′37″W	Category A	40624	Upload another image See more images
87-89 South Street				56°20′23″N 2°47′39″W	Category B	40627	Upload Photo
123, 125 South Street				56°20′23″N 2°47′48″W	Category C(S)	40635	Upload Photo
131 South Street				56°20′22″N 2°47′50″W	Category C(S)	40638	Upload Photo
193, 195 South Street				56°20′21″N 2°47′59″W	Category C(S)	40654	Upload Photo
211, 213 South Street And 3, 5, 7 City Road				56°20′20″N 2°48′03″W	Category C(S)	40660	Upload Photo
St. Leonard's, Grant Memorial Dial				56°20′19″N 2°47′23″W	Category B	40672	Upload Photo
46 South Street, With Garden Walls Of Lang Rig				56°20′22″N 2°47′32″W	Category B	40678	Upload Photo
62 South Street				56°20′22″N 2°47′37″W	Category B	40685	Upload Photo
112, 114 South Street				56°20′20″N 2°47′48″W	Category C(S)	40700	Upload Photo
Pilmour Links, Rusack's Hotel With Boundary Walls And Piers				56°20′34″N 2°48′15″W	Category B	45916	Upload Photo
Hepburn Gardens, Hepburn Hall Including Ancillary Structure, Garden, Boundary Walls And Gatepiers				56°20′07″N 2°48′40″W	Category C(S)	46552	Upload Photo
18, 18A And 20 Hepburn Gardens (Toll Park) Including Boundary Walls				56°20′14″N 2°48′26″W	Category C(S)	50920	Upload Photo
112 South Street (Last House In Close), Including Garden Walls				56°20′19″N 2°47′48″W	Category B	44610	Upload Photo
2 Logie's Lane				56°20′24″N 2°47′46″W	Category C(S)	40887	Upload Photo
3, 4, 5 Logie's Lane				56°20′24″N 2°47′46″W	Category C(S)	40888	Upload Photo
9 Crail's Lane				56°20′24″N 2°47′40″W	Category C(S)	40890	Upload Photo
Kinburn Hotel, Doubledykes Road				56°20′21″N 2°48′15″W	Category C(S)	40918	Upload Photo
96 Hepburn Gardens, Wayside And Easterwayside Including Boundary Walls And Gatepiers				56°20′04″N 2°48′51″W	Category B	40926	Upload Photo
Lade Braes, Plash Mill Cottage (Formerly New Mill & New Park School Cottage)				56°20′01″N 2°48′52″W	Category C(S)	40927	Upload Photo
Lade Braes, Law Mill And Lawmill Cottage				56°19′55″N 2°49′22″W	Category C(S)	40930	Upload Photo
Hepburn Gardens And Buchanan Gardens, K6 Telephone Kiosk				56°20′08″N 2°48′45″W	Category B	40935	Upload Photo
140-146 North Street				56°20′29″N 2°47′54″W	Category B	40802	Upload Photo
1, 2 Gregory Place				56°20′27″N 2°47′19″W	Category C(S)	40813	Upload Photo
Martyrs' Monument, The Scores				56°20′36″N 2°48′03″W	Category B	40817	Upload another image
Royal And Ancient Golf Club House, The Scores, Golf Place				56°20′37″N 2°48′08″W	Category B	40820	Upload another image
1 Gillespie Terrace, The Scores				56°20′35″N 2°48′03″W	Category C(S)	40824	Upload Photo
6 Gillespie Terrace, The Scores				56°20′34″N 2°48′00″W	Category B	40829	Upload Photo
33 North Castle Street Frontage Only Excluding Building In Court				56°20′27″N 2°47′26″W	Category C(S)	40854	Upload Photo
43 North Castle Street				56°20′28″N 2°47′25″W	Category B	40857	Upload Photo
19 Church Street				56°20′23″N 2°47′42″W	Category C(S)	40878	Upload Photo
136 South Street (Within Close)				56°20′19″N 2°47′57″W	Category B	40711	Upload Photo
156 South Street, Including Garden Walls Of Lang Rig				56°20′19″N 2°47′59″W	Category C(S)	40717	Upload Photo
158 South Street, With Garden Walls Of Lang Rig, Including Those Now Belonging To Braidland				56°20′19″N 2°47′59″W	Category C(S)	40718	Upload Photo
21 Market Street				56°20′25″N 2°47′33″W	Category B	40727	Upload Photo
Royal Bank Of Scotland, 83 Market Street				56°20′27″N 2°47′43″W	Category C(S)	40734	Upload Photo
66 Market Street				56°20′25″N 2°47′40″W	Category C(S)	40741	Upload Photo
68 Market Street				56°20′25″N 2°47′40″W	Category B	40742	Upload Photo
5 St. Mary's Place				56°20′24″N 2°48′00″W	Category C(S)	40753	Upload Photo
27 North Street				56°20′27″N 2°47′25″W	Category C(S)	40762	Upload Photo
24, 26 North Street And 20 South Castle Street				56°20′26″N 2°47′28″W	Category C(S)	40779	Upload Photo
46-50 North Street				56°20′27″N 2°47′32″W	Category C(S)	40784	Upload Photo
Abbey (Shore) Mill Now Fishermen's Store, The Shore				56°20′19″N 2°47′05″W	Category B	40594	Upload Photo
3 South Street				56°20′24″N 2°47′23″W	Category A	40601	Upload Photo
5 South Street				56°20′24″N 2°47′23″W	Category B	40602	Upload Photo
15 South Street				56°20′24″N 2°47′26″W	Category B	40605	Upload Photo
31 South Street				56°20′24″N 2°47′30″W	Category C(S)	40611	Upload Photo
39, 41 South Street				56°20′23″N 2°47′31″W	Category B	40613	Upload Photo
53 South Street				56°20′23″N 2°47′34″W	Category C(S)	40618	Upload Photo
129 South Street. (Exclude Telephone Booths At Ground Floor)				56°20′22″N 2°47′49″W	Category C(S)	40637	Upload Photo
169, 171 South Street				56°20′21″N 2°47′55″W	Category C(S)	40648	Upload Photo
205, 207 South Street				56°20′20″N 2°48′01″W	Category B	40658	Upload Photo
44 South Street With Garden Walls Of Lang Rig, Including The Parts Now Belonging To Greenside Cottage				56°20′22″N 2°47′32″W	Category B	40677	Upload Photo
54 South Street, With Garden Walls Of Lang Rig				56°20′22″N 2°47′34″W	Category B	40681	Upload Photo
University Library Original Building				56°20′21″N 2°47′38″W	Category A	40687	Upload Photo
Dovecot, St. Mary's College				56°20′16″N 2°47′40″W	Category B	40691	Upload Photo
Bell-Pettigrew Building				56°20′16″N 2°47′38″W	Category C(S)	40693	Upload Photo
7 And 8 The Links, Tom Morris House And Golf Shop				56°20′34″N 2°48′11″W	Category C(S)	46273	Upload Photo
13 The Links, Links House, St Andrews Golf Club With Boundary Wall And Railings				56°20′34″N 2°48′12″W	Category C(S)	48319	Upload Photo
100 Hepburn Gardens, Century House (Formerly Newmill)				56°19′59″N 2°48′58″W	Category C(S)	50923	Upload Photo
Kennedy Gardens, Liscombe And Holly Lodge Including Boundary Walls				56°20′18″N 2°48′33″W	Category C(S)	50924	Upload Photo
County Library, Church Square, Including Later East Wing				56°20′24″N 2°47′45″W	Category B	40885	Upload Photo
3 Bell Street, 142/144 Market Street				56°20′25″N 2°47′55″W	Category B	40898	Upload Photo
1-15 Howard Place				56°20′28″N 2°48′06″W	Category B	40903	Upload Photo
Kennedy Gardens, University Hall, Wardlaw Wing (Formerly Westerlee) Including Boundary Walls And Gatepiers				56°20′19″N 2°48′36″W	Category B	40920	Upload another image
The Whaum, 22 The Scores				56°20′34″N 2°47′52″W	Category C(S)	40823	Upload Photo
2 Gillespie Terrace, The Scores				56°20′34″N 2°48′03″W	Category C(S)	40825	Upload Photo
St. Andrews Episcopal Church, Queen's Terrace				56°20′14″N 2°47′46″W	Category B	40845	Upload Photo
25 North Castle Street				56°20′27″N 2°47′26″W	Category C(S)	40850	Upload Photo
27 North Castle Street				56°20′27″N 2°47′26″W	Category C(S)	40851	Upload Photo
11, 13 College Street				56°20′27″N 2°47′42″W	Category A	40868	Upload Photo
3, 5 Church Street				56°20′25″N 2°47′42″W	Category C(S)	40875	Upload Photo
Southgait Hall (Originally Royal Hotel). South Street				56°20′20″N 2°47′49″W	Category B	40702	Upload Photo
166, 168 South Street, Including Garden Walls Of Lang Rig				56°20′18″N 2°48′01″W	Category B	40720	Upload Photo
3, 5 Market Street And 10 South Castle Street				56°20′25″N 2°47′29″W	Category B	40725	Upload Photo
19 Market Street				56°20′25″N 2°47′32″W	Category C(S)	40726	Upload Photo
23 North Street				56°20′27″N 2°47′24″W	Category B	40760	Upload Photo
25 North Street				56°20′26″N 2°47′25″W	Category C(S)	40761	Upload Photo
29 North Street				56°20′27″N 2°47′26″W	Category C(S)	40763	Upload Photo
77 North Street Old Students' Union				56°20′29″N 2°47′42″W	Category B	40773	Upload Photo
54 North Street				56°20′27″N 2°47′34″W	Category C(S)	40787	Upload Photo
136, 138 North Street				56°20′29″N 2°47′52″W	Category C(S)	40801	Upload Photo
19 South Street				56°20′23″N 2°47′27″W	Category B	40607	Upload Photo
45 South Street				56°20′23″N 2°47′33″W	Category C(S)	40615	Upload Photo
47 South Street				56°20′23″N 2°47′33″W	Category B	40616	Upload Photo
59, 61 South Street				56°20′23″N 2°47′35″W	Category B	40620	Upload Photo
73-81 South Street				56°20′23″N 2°47′38″W	Category B	40625	Upload Photo
91 South Street And 1 Crail's Lane				56°20′23″N 2°47′40″W	Category B	40628	Upload Photo
105, 107 South Street And 29, 31 Church Street				56°20′22″N 2°47′42″W	Category C(S)	40632	Upload Photo
147, 149 South Street				56°20′21″N 2°47′52″W	Category B	40643	Upload Photo
157 South Street				56°20′21″N 2°47′53″W	Category C(S)	40645	Upload Photo
10 South Street				56°20′22″N 2°47′25″W	Category B	40664	Upload Photo
St Leonard's College, Including Garden Walls				56°20′21″N 2°47′24″W	Category B	40668	Upload Photo
34 South Street				56°20′22″N 2°47′29″W	Category B	40674	Upload Photo
46 South Street, Dovecot				56°20′18″N 2°47′32″W	Category B	40679	Upload Photo
Bute Medical Building				56°20′17″N 2°47′38″W	Category C(S)	40692	Upload Photo
108, 110 South Street				56°20′21″N 2°47′48″W	Category B	40698	Upload Photo
The Scores, Hamilton Hall				56°20′35″N 2°48′06″W	Category B	46109	Upload Photo
North Street, University Of St Andrews, Younger Hall				56°20′29″N 2°47′32″W	Category B	48318	Upload another image
Hepburn Gardens, University Playing Field, St Andrews University Rugby Football Club Stand				56°20′10″N 2°48′53″W	Category C(S)	50919	Upload Photo
50 And 52 Hepburn Gardens Including Boundary Walls				56°20′10″N 2°48′36″W	Category C(S)	50922	Upload Photo
4-6 Church Square				56°20′24″N 2°47′45″W	Category C(S)	40884	Upload Photo
Boots' Building, 1 Logie's Lane				56°20′25″N 2°47′46″W	Category B	40886	Upload Photo
11 Crail's Lane				56°20′24″N 2°47′40″W	Category C(S)	40891	Upload Photo
Rose Park, City Road				56°20′25″N 2°48′10″W	Category C(S)	40906	Upload Photo
22 City Road				56°20′27″N 2°48′10″W	Category B	40907	Upload Photo
59 Argyle Street				56°20′19″N 2°48′15″W	Category C(S)	40910	Upload Photo
31, 33, 35 And 37 Kinnessburn Road (Former 1-3 Fleming Place) Including Ancillary Structure And Boundary Walls				56°20′11″N 2°47′58″W	Category C(S)	40913	Upload Photo
Kennedy Gardens, Rathmore (Formerly Rathelpie Villa) Including Little Rathmore, Upper Rathmore, North Flat, South Flat And Boundary Walls				56°20′20″N 2°48′27″W	Category C(S)	40919	Upload Photo
Kennedy Gardens And Donaldson Gardens, University Hall, Old Wing Including Boundary Walls And Gatepiers				56°20′17″N 2°48′41″W	Category B	40921	Upload Photo
3 Ellice Place				56°20′31″N 2°47′59″W	Category C(S)	40804	Upload Photo
19 Pilmour Links And Grannie Clark's Wynd With Boundary Walls And Gatepier				56°20′33″N 2°48′18″W	Category B	40810	Upload Photo
12 Greenside Place				56°20′16″N 2°47′29″W	Category C(S)	40833	Upload Photo
14 South Castle Street				56°20′26″N 2°47′28″W	Category C(S)	40848	Upload Photo
31 North Castle Street				56°20′27″N 2°47′26″W	Category C(S)	40853	Upload Photo
5 Union Street				56°20′26″N 2°47′38″W	Category B	40862	Upload Photo
7 Union Street				56°20′26″N 2°47′38″W	Category B	40863	Upload Photo
Madras College Main Building				56°20′16″N 2°47′52″W	Category A	40703	Upload Photo
Britannia Hotel, 170 South Street				56°20′19″N 2°48′01″W	Category C(S)	40721	Upload Photo
77, 79 Market Street And 1, 3 College Street				56°20′26″N 2°47′42″W	Category C(S)	40732	Upload Photo
British Linen Bank, 81 Market Street				56°20′26″N 2°47′43″W	Category B	40733	Upload Photo
Cross Keys Hotel, Market Street				56°20′27″N 2°47′45″W	Category C(S)	40735	Upload Photo
62-64 Market Street				56°20′25″N 2°47′39″W	Category C(S)	40740	Upload Photo
19, 21 North Street				56°20′26″N 2°47′23″W	Category B	40759	Upload Photo
18, 20 North Street				56°20′26″N 2°47′26″W	Category B	40777	Upload Photo
36, 36A North Street				56°20′26″N 2°47′30″W	Category B	40782	Upload Photo
52 North Street, Greyfriars' Hotel				56°20′27″N 2°47′32″W	Category C(S)	40785	Upload Photo
52A North Street				56°20′27″N 2°47′33″W	Category C(S)	40786	Upload Photo
60 North Street				56°20′27″N 2°47′35″W	Category C(S)	40789	Upload Photo
122, 124 North Street				56°20′29″N 2°47′50″W	Category B	40800	Upload Photo
1 South Street The Roundel, Including Garden Walls				56°20′24″N 2°47′22″W	Category A	40600	Upload Photo
63 South Street				56°20′23″N 2°47′35″W	Category B	40621	Upload Photo
83-85 South Street				56°20′23″N 2°47′39″W	Category B	40626	Upload Photo
Holy Trinity Church (Town Kirk), South Street				56°20′23″N 2°47′44″W	Category A	40633	Upload another image See more images
159 South Street				56°20′21″N 2°47′54″W	Category C(S)	40646	Upload Photo
173 South Street				56°20′21″N 2°47′56″W	Category C(S)	40649	Upload Photo
177-179 South Street				56°20′21″N 2°47′57″W	Category C(S)	40651	Upload Photo
181-187 South Street				56°20′21″N 2°47′58″W	Category C(S)	40652	Upload Photo
14 South Street Including Garden Walls				56°20′23″N 2°47′26″W	Category B	40665	Upload Photo
St Leonard's School, St. Leonard's Lane Including Garden Walls				56°20′21″N 2°47′27″W	Category C(S)	40669	Upload Photo
St Leonard's, Oliphant Memorial Gates				56°20′18″N 2°47′19″W	Category B	40670	Upload Photo
36 And 38A-E (Formerly 36-40 South Street, "The Great Eastern')				56°20′22″N 2°47′30″W	Category B	40675	Upload Photo
52 South Street, With Garden Walls Of Lang Rig, Including Those Now Belonging To Abbey Close And Red Roofs				56°20′22″N 2°47′33″W	Category B	40680	Upload Photo
60 South Street, With Garden Walls Of Lang Rig				56°20′22″N 2°47′35″W	Category B	40684	Upload Photo
St. Mary's College, West Range, Principal's House And Precinct, Including West Boundary Wall				56°20′21″N 2°47′41″W	Category A	40686	Upload another image See more images
University Library 1908 Extension				56°20′19″N 2°47′37″W	Category B	40689	Upload Photo
Sundial, St. Mary's College				56°20′19″N 2°47′39″W	Category B	40690	Upload Photo
3 Pilmour Links				56°20′32″N 2°48′10″W	Category C(S)	46270	Upload Photo
6 Pilmour Links With Boundary Walls, Gate And Railings				56°20′33″N 2°48′11″W	Category C(S)	46271	Upload Photo
Kinnessburn Road And Langlands Road, Boy's Brigade Hall Including Gates And Boundary Railings				56°20′09″N 2°47′34″W	Category B	49363	Upload Photo
6-8 Church Street				56°20′24″N 2°47′43″W	Category C(S)	40882	Upload Photo
13 Crail's Lane				56°20′24″N 2°47′40″W	Category C(S)	40892	Upload Photo
16 Crail's Lane				56°20′24″N 2°47′41″W	Category C(S)	40893	Upload Photo
11 Greyfriars Garden				56°20′28″N 2°47′55″W	Category B	40896	Upload Photo
34 Argyle Street				56°20′18″N 2°48′11″W	Category C(S)	40911	Upload Photo
54 Argyle Street, End Rigg				56°20′18″N 2°48′14″W	Category C(S)	40912	Upload Photo
4 Hepburn Gardens, Rathelpie Cottage				56°20′16″N 2°48′23″W	Category C(S)	40923	Upload Photo
St Andrews War Memorial, North Street				56°20′26″N 2°47′19″W	Category B	40937	Upload another image
48 South Street				56°20′22″N 2°47′33″W	Category B	40939	Upload Photo
1, 2 Ellice Place				56°20′31″N 2°48′00″W	Category C(S)	40803	Upload Photo
18 The Links, The Swilken				56°20′34″N 2°48′21″W	Category B	40811	Upload Photo
Balfour House				56°20′12″N 2°47′03″W	Category C(S)	40831	Upload Photo
22 Greenside Place				56°20′15″N 2°47′31″W	Category C(S)	40835	Upload Photo
Dauphin Hill House, Abbey Walk And 4 Greenside Place				56°20′17″N 2°47′28″W	Category B	40836	Upload Photo
3 Queen's Gardens				56°20′19″N 2°47′43″W	Category B	40841	Upload Photo
Gate To South Part University Botanic Gardens, Queen's Terrace				56°20′14″N 2°47′36″W	Category C(S)	40844	Upload Photo
11 South Castle Street (Joan's House)				56°20′25″N 2°47′27″W	Category B	40846	Upload Photo
8 College Street				56°20′27″N 2°47′43″W	Category C(S)	40872	Upload Photo
11, 13 Church Street				56°20′24″N 2°47′42″W	Category C(S)	40876	Upload Photo
Madras College Schoolhouse East				56°20′20″N 2°47′51″W	Category B	40704	Upload another image
Baptist Church, South Street				56°20′19″N 2°47′55″W	Category C(S)	40707	Upload Photo
172 South Street				56°20′19″N 2°48′02″W	Category B	40722	Upload Photo
56-60 Market Street				56°20′25″N 2°47′39″W	Category C(S)	40739	Upload Photo
74-76 Market Street And 1 Church Street				56°20′25″N 2°47′42″W	Category C(S)	40744	Upload Photo
1-4 Lockhart Place, Market Street				56°20′25″N 2°48′03″W	Category B	40751	Upload Photo
Hope Park Church, Market Street				56°20′26″N 2°48′06″W	Category B	40752	Upload another image See more images
All Saints Rectory, North Street				56°20′27″N 2°47′29″W	Category B	40765	Upload another image
Old Castle Tavern, 22 North Street And 23 South Castle Street				56°20′26″N 2°47′26″W	Category C(S)	40778	Upload Photo
56, 58 North Street, Reden Hotel				56°20′27″N 2°47′34″W	Category C(S)	40788	Upload Photo
68 North Street				56°20′27″N 2°47′37″W	Category C(S)	40792	Upload Photo
Kirkheugh Cottage, Shorehead				56°20′22″N 2°47′05″W	Category B	40598	Upload Photo
29 South Street				56°20′23″N 2°47′29″W	Category C(S)	40610	Upload Photo
49, (51) South Street				56°20′23″N 2°47′34″W	Category B	40617	Upload Photo
95 South Street				56°20′23″N 2°47′40″W	Category C(S)	40629	Upload Photo
97-99 South Street				56°20′23″N 2°47′41″W	Category C(S)	40630	Upload Photo
127 South Street, Post Office				56°20′22″N 2°47′49″W	Category C(S)	40636	Upload Photo
141, 143 South Street				56°20′21″N 2°47′51″W	Category B	40641	Upload Photo
145 South Street				56°20′21″N 2°47′52″W	Category C(S)	40642	Upload Photo
2 South Street, "Priorsgate' Including Garden Walls And Outbuilding				56°20′23″N 2°47′22″W	Category B	40661	Upload Photo
4 South Street, Queen Mary's House Including Garden Walls And Grotto				56°20′22″N 2°47′24″W	Category A	40662	Upload Photo
6, 8 South Street				56°20′23″N 2°47′24″W	Category C(S)	40663	Upload Photo
112 South Street (Second House In Close)				56°20′20″N 2°47′48″W	Category B	40699	Upload Photo
60 Argyle Street, The Garage (Former Cartshed And Byre) Including Boundary Wall				56°20′17″N 2°48′15″W	Category C(S)	46258	Upload Photo
15 And 16 The Links, Waldon House, With Boundary Walls And Railings				56°20′34″N 2°48′13″W	Category C(S)	46275	Upload Photo
North Haugh, University of St Andrews, Andrew Melville Hall				56°20′26″N 2°49′03″W	Category A	51846	Upload another image

== Key ==
The scheme for classifying buildings in Scotland is:

- Category A: "buildings of national or international importance, either architectural or historic; or fine, little-altered examples of some particular period, style or building type."
- Category B: "buildings of regional or more than local importance; or major examples of some particular period, style or building type, which may have been altered."
- Category C: "buildings of local importance; lesser examples of any period, style, or building type, as originally constructed or moderately altered; and simple traditional buildings which group well with other listed buildings."

In March 2016 there were 47,288 listed buildings in Scotland. Of these, 8% were Category A, and 50% were Category B, with the remaining 42% being Category C.

== See also ==
- List of listed buildings in Fife
