= Swilcan Burn =

Stream in St Andrews, Scotland

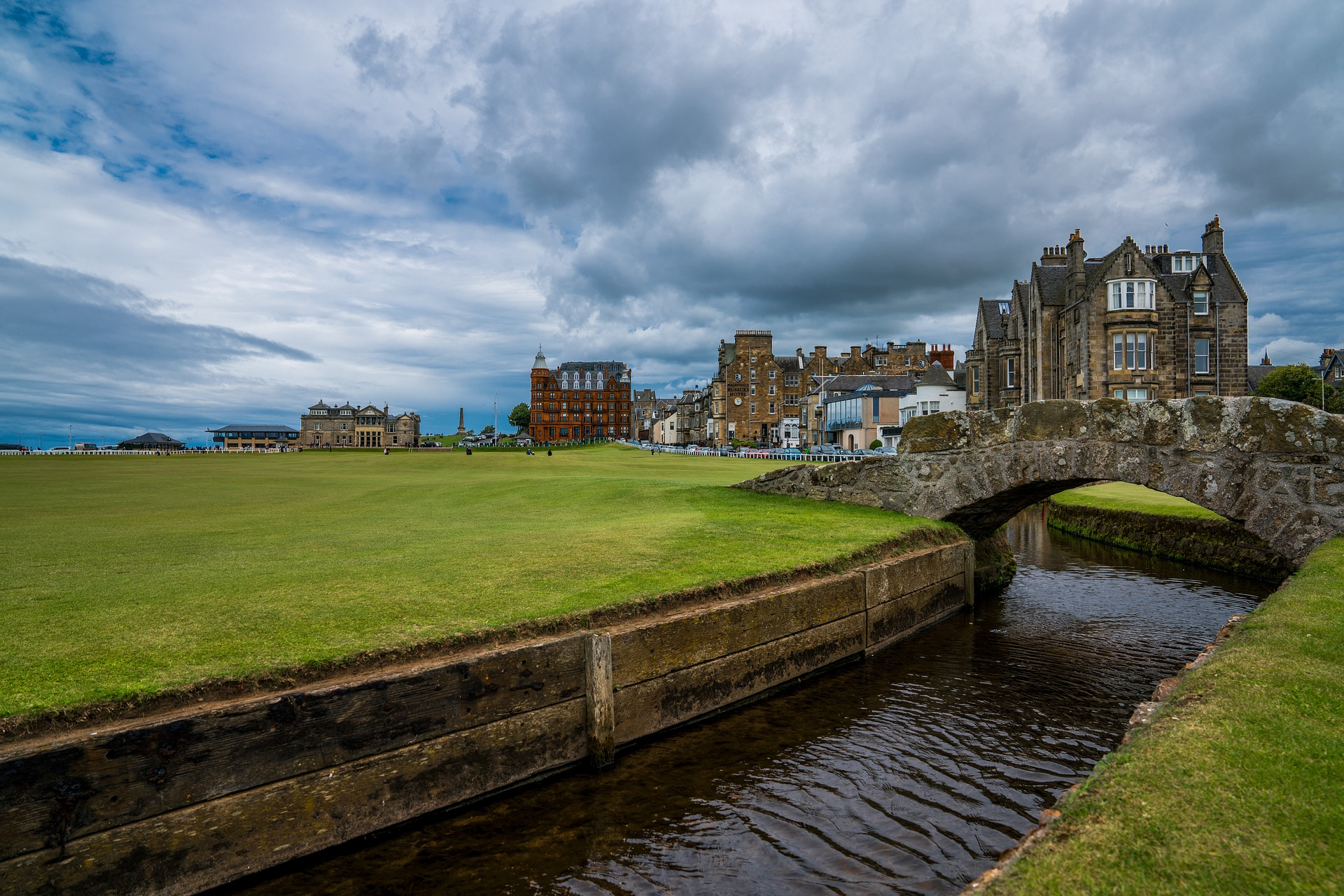
- The burn flowing under the Swilcan Bridge, with the Royal and Ancient Golf Club and Hamilton Grand in the background

Location
- Country: Scotland

Physical characteristics
- Source
  - location: Near Strathkinness
  - coordinates: 56°20′25.4″N 2°51′57.8″W
- Mouth: North Sea
  - location: St Andrews
  - coordinates: 56°20′42.3″N 2°48′11.7″W

The Swilcan or Swilken Burn is a 2 3/4-mile-long (4.5 km) stream in Fife, Scotland. It flows into the North Sea to the north of the town of St Andrews on the east coast of Fife.

== Course ==
The burn rises as field drains to the northeast of the village of Strathkinness, three miles west of St Andrews. From here it flows eastwards, past the University of St Andrews' North Haugh campus and under the A91 road, before emerging at the Old Course, where it represents a water hazard. The famous Swilcan Bridge spans the burn between the first and eighteenth fairways. After traversing the couse, the burn falls into the North Sea at the southern end of West Sands Beach.

== Etymology ==
The burn's name, which is variously spelled Swilken, Swilcan, and (in older records) Swilcauth, is of obscure origin. It may be a derivative of the Scots word swelch, meaning "whirlpool" or "abyss in the sea", perhaps with reference to the burn's habit of swallowing up golf balls.

== History ==
Approaching the sea and flowing through the golf course, the Swilcan Burn used to change its course from time to time, until 1834 when the construction of retaining walls took place, fixing the course of the stream for the first time. In 1879, the course of the burn within the golf course was changed as a result of a dispute between landowners.

At least until the mid-19th century, the Swilcan Burn was used by townspeople to wash their clothes. The 1842 rulebook adopted by the Royal and Ancient Golf Club of St Andrews stipulated that "When a ball lies on clothes or within a club-length of a washing tub, the clothes may be drawn from under the ball, and the tub may be removed."
