= Swilcan Bridge =

Small stone bridge in St Andrews Links golf course, Scotland

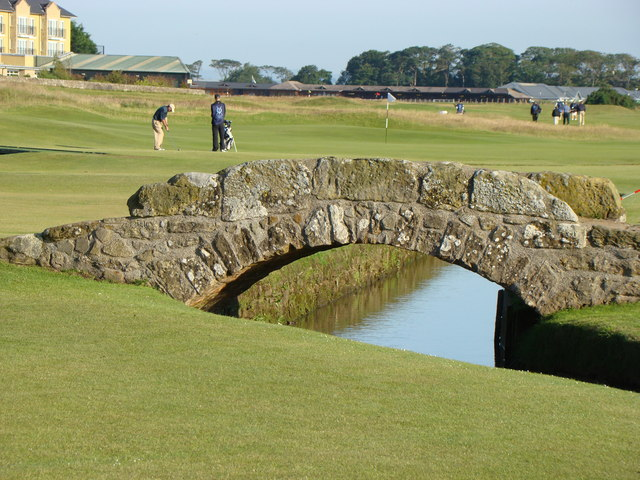
- Bridge crossing the Swilcan Burn
- Coordinates: 56.3432°N 2.8070°W
- Carries: Pedestrians
- Crosses: Swilcan Burn
- Locale: Fife
- Other name(s): The Swilken Bridge; Golfers’ Bridge

Characteristics
- Design: Arch
- Material: Stone
- No. of spans: 1

Location
- Interactive map of Swilcan Bridge

The Swilcan Bridge or Swilken Bridge is a small stone bridge on the 18th hole of the Old Course in St Andrews, Scotland. Existing in some form since the 15th century, the bridge is considered in golf to be a signature for one of the game's most famous, ancient holes. The bridge had previously been known as the Golfers' Bridge for hundreds of years.

The bridge spans the Swilcan Burn and has become a legendary image in the sport of golf. Since the 20th century, legends of professional golf and champions of The Open Championship held on the Old Course have posed on the bridge. The Swilcan Bridge is considered to be one of the most iconic symbols for golf and Scotland in the world.

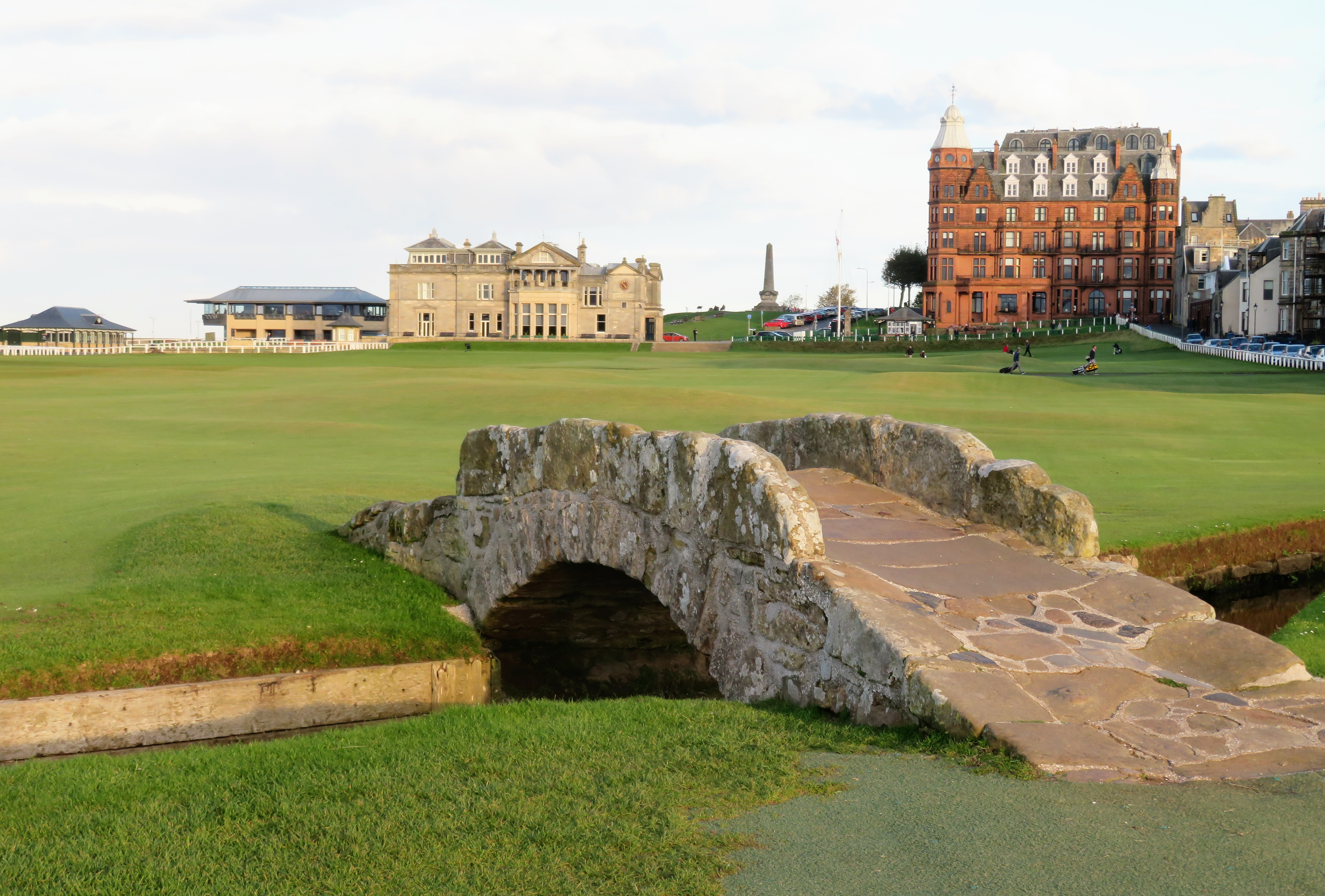
The Swilcan Bridge spanning the Swilcan Burn, with The Royal and Ancient clubhouse and the Hamilton Grand in the distance

The bridge itself is small; at its furthest extent, it measures about 30 ft (9.1 m) long, 8 ft (2.4 m) wide, and 6 ft (1.8 m) tall, in the style of a simple Roman arch. Originally built at least 700 years ago to help shepherds get livestock across, it has the modern photographic advantage of great backdrops on three sides: the course's grand Royal and Ancient Clubhouse and Hamilton Grand on one, often a packed grandstand of enthusiasts on another, and rolling hills facing toward the North Sea, on the third.

The approach to the bridge was on turf, although there had been a stone path in the distant past. Due to the prominence of the bridge, many people often congregated near it—for example to see and photograph players standing on it, and to stand on the bridge when golf was not being played—which caused the turf to become badly eroded. This was addressed by frequent returfing or reseeding of the area, and experimenting with artificial turf, but the problem remained. In 2023, the area that saw the most wear was paved with stone, as it had been in the distant past. This led to criticism that it looked like a "DIY patio". In February 2023, following continued criticism, St Andrews Links Trust removed the stonework and reinstated the turf, saying the new surface did not suit the bridge's historic setting.

It is customary for champions of golf to publicly show some sort of homage or respect to the structure. For example, in early July 2010 at The Open Championship, Tom Watson was photographed kissing the bridge. At the 2005 Open Championship, Jack Nicklaus gave his final farewell to professional golf while standing on the bridge.

On the second floor of the World Golf Hall of Fame museum in St. Augustine, Florida, there is a life-size stone replica of the Swilcan Bridge, accompanied by a floor-to-ceiling photograph of the Royal & Ancient clubhouse and Hamilton Hall in the background.

== See also ==
- List of bridges in Scotland
