= Charles Ernest Monro =

Scottish architect (1874–1945)

- Born: 27 July 1874
- Died: 14 November 1945 (aged 71)
- Occupation: Architect
- Buildings: Hamilton Grand, St Andrews, Scotland

Charles Ernest Moro (27 July 1874 – 14 November 1945) was a Scottish architect, prominent in the second half of the 19th century and the first half of the 20th. He designed several notable buildings, several of which are now of listed status.

== Life and career ==
Monro was born in Glasgow in 1874 to James Milne Monro, a local architect, and Sarah Mary Potter. He attended Allan Glen's School and the Royal Technical College.

He joined the practice of his father, initially in 1893 as a trainee, and again in 1898 as an assistant. He was made partner five years later, with the firm's name becoming J. M. Monro and Son.

Monro was admitted to the Associate of the Royal Institute of British Architects (ARIBA) in 1903, a year after becoming president of the Architectural Craftsmen's Association.

He married Janet Alexander Miller, with whom he had a son, Geoffrey James, in 1907, and a daughter.

After the death of his father in 1921, Monro continued the practice and designed several notable buildings in such cities as Glasgow, Manchester and London.

=== Selected notable works ===
- Hamilton Grand, St Andrews, Scotland – now Category B listed (1893)
- Chapel of St Joseph's Convent of the Little Sisters of the Poor – now Category B listed (1897)
- Marks & Spencers store, Glasgow, Scotland – now Category A listed (1929)
- 16, 18, 28, 30 and 32 Argyle Street, Glasgow, Scotland – now Category B listed (1931)

== Death ==
Monro died in 1945, aged 71, from an intracerebral haemorrhage.
