= St Andrews Town Hall =

Municipal building in St Andrews, Scotland

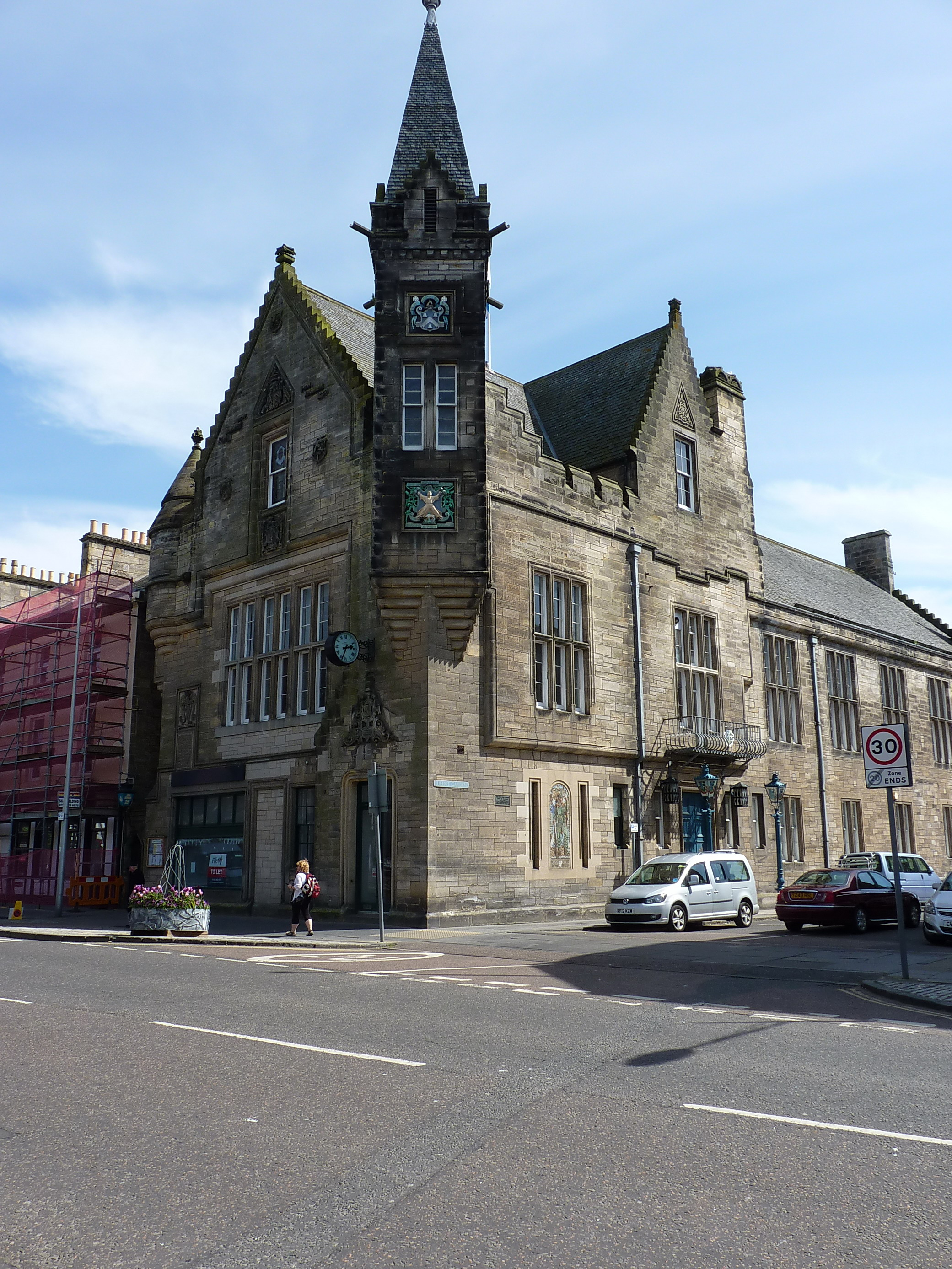
- St Andrews Town Hall

- Shown in Fife
- 56.3391°N 2.7954°W
- Location: South Street, St Andrews

History
- Built: 1862

Site notes
- Architect: James Anderson Hamilton
- Architectural style: Scottish baronial style

Listed Building – Category B
- Official name: Town Hall, South Street and Queen's Gardens
- Designated: 23 February 1971
- Reference no.: LB40695

St Andrews Town Hall is a municipal structure in South Street, St Andrews, Fife, Scotland. The structure, which is the meeting place of the Royal Burgh of St Andrews Community Council, is a Category B listed building.

== History ==
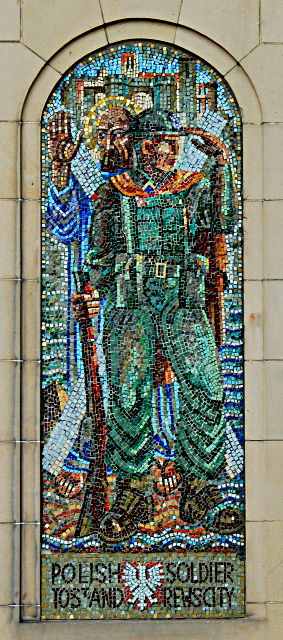
The mosaic created by three Polish servicemen

The first municipal building in the town was a medieval tolbooth in the centre of Market Street which dated back to the 12th century. The building was arcaded on the ground floor, so markets could be held, with an assembly room on the first floor; an extra storey was added in 1817, but, after the building became an impediment to traffic, it was demolished in 1862. The burgh leaders decided to procure a new burgh hall: the site they chose in South Street was occupied by a row of residential properties.

Construction work on the new building started in 1858. It was designed by James Anderson Hamilton in the Scottish baronial style, built in rubble masonry by John M'Intosh and was completed in 1862. The design involved an asymmetrical main frontage facing onto South Street; it featured a bartizan in the northeast corner, a central six-light mullioned window on the first floor and a central stepped gable containing a single sash window. There was a prominent corbelled turret with a conical roof in the northwest corner. It originally extended for seven bays along Queen's Gardens and, internally, the principal rooms were the council chamber and the assembly hall.

A mosaic, created by three Polish servicemen, was installed on the Queen's Gardens elevation of the building and unveiled in October 1941 to record the appreciation of the many Polish soldiers who had been welcomed to St Andrews following the capitulation of Poland at the start of the Second World War. The building was extended along Queen's Gardens by two more bays in a similar style in the 1964. The complex continued to serve as the headquarters of the burgh council for much of the 20th century, but ceased to be the local seat of government when the enlarged North East Fife District Council was formed in 1975. It subsequently became the meeting place of the Royal Burgh of St Andrews Community Council.

Works of art in the town hall include a portrait by an unknown artist of the member of parliament, George Dempster of Dunnichen, and a portrait by John Watson Gordon of the former provost of St Andrews, Sir Hugh Lyon Playfair. There is also a wood carving by the Polish artist, Józef Sękalski, depicting the crucifixion of St Andrew and a boar.

== See also ==
- List of listed buildings in St Andrews, Fife
