= Hamilton Grand =

Apartment building in St Andrews, Scotland

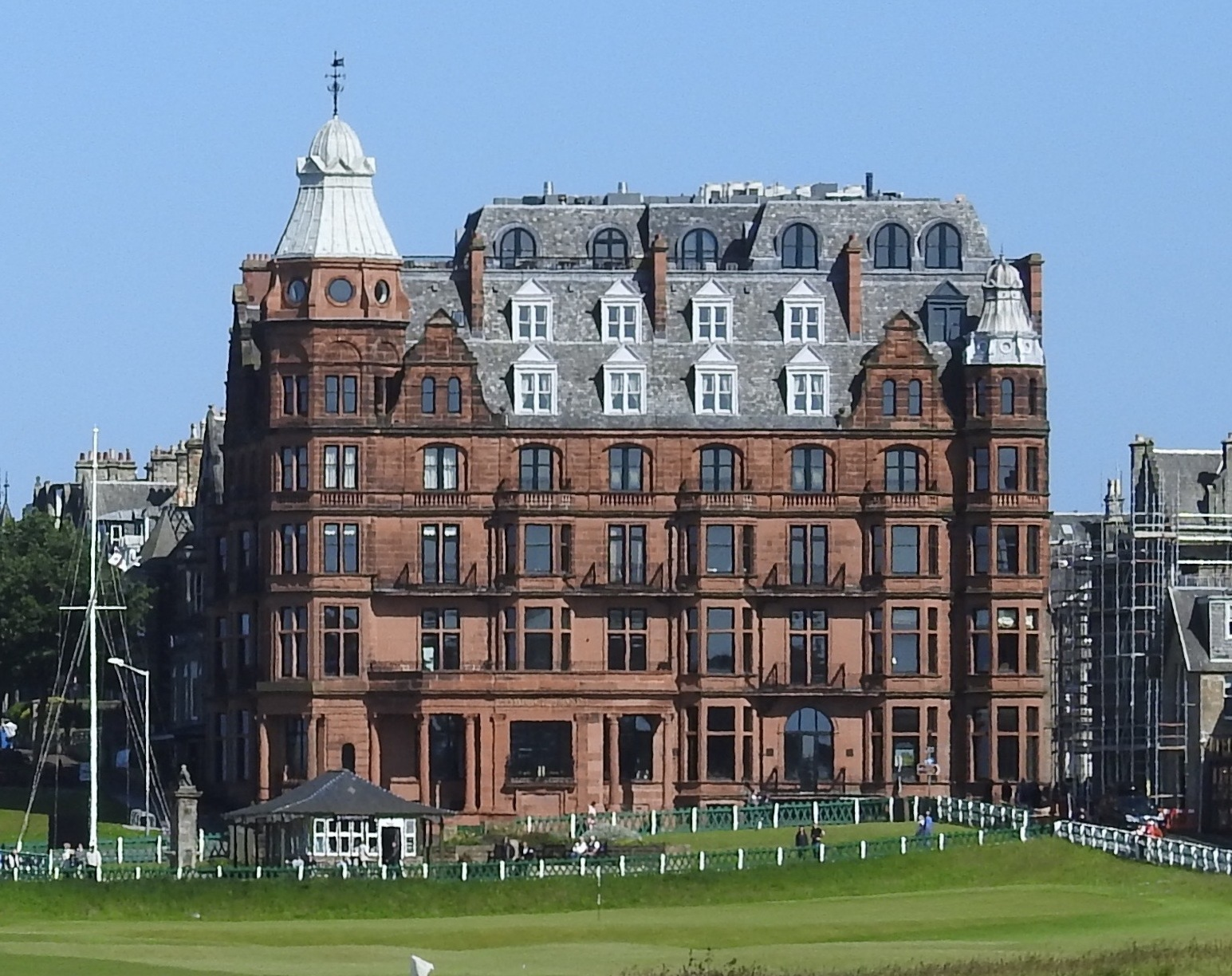
- Former names: Hamilton Hall, Grand Hotel

General information
- Location: 21 Golf Place, St. Andrews, Scotland
- Coordinates: 56.343565°N 2.802801°W
- Opened: 1895
- Cost: £18,000 and £4,000 for site
- Owner: Herbert Kohler Jr.

Design and construction
- Architect: Charles Ernest Monro
- Architecture firm: J M Monro & Son

Renovating team
- Architect: Sir John James Burnet

Other information
- Number of rooms: 26 bedroom apartments

Listed Building – Category B
- Official name: The Scores, Hamilton Hall
- Designated: 16 April 1999
- Reference no.: LB46109

Website
- www.hamiltongrand.co.uk

Hamilton Grand is a prominent apartment building in St Andrews, Scotland. The building is located on Golf Place, beside the Old Course. It is seen in the coverage of the many golf tournaments played over the Old Course, and was featured in the 1981 film Chariots of Fire.

== Grand Hotel ==
The building originally opened as the Grand Hotel in 1895 at the time of a rapid expansion of St Andrews as a popular tourist destination. It was built by businessman Thomas Hamilton, to overshadow the Royal & Ancient Golf Clubhouse, after reputedly being blackballed when he sought membership of the Club. The Grand Hotel was in a prime location to take advantage of two of the city's attractions: golf and sea bathing. Indeed, the hotel soon became very successful and even managed to attract royal clientele in the early years of the twentieth century. However, the hotel was requisitioned by the armed forces during the Second World War and never reopened as a hotel. Following the end of the war, there was a proposal to sell the building to the Roman Catholic Church as a residence and seminary. This plan caused much alarm among the more traditional Presbyterians in the town and was soon abandoned.

== Hamilton Hall (student hall of residences) ==
The hotel was acquired by the University of St Andrews, was renamed Hamilton Hall after the Duke of Hamilton, then the Chancellor of the university, and was opened as a hall of residence in 1949. In 2004 the university announced that it was to sell the hall as the result of an unsolicited bid. Consequently, the university session 2005−06 was the last year that Hamilton Hall was open as a hall of residence. The building was sold for £20 million. In addition, it was decided that Eden Court—an annexe to the main hall—would also be sold. However, it was not bought by the same purchasers and has since become an administrative building for the university, hosting the Student Services Department.

Following refurbishment and renovation, the main building of the former hall has been converted into a number of private residences.

== Development into Hamilton Grand ==
Wasserman Real Estate Capital obtained planning permission to convert the building into 23 luxury timeshare apartments.

In July 2006, work began on Hamilton Hall to convert it into a prestigious residence club, to be called The St Andrews Grand. While many options were considered for Hamilton Hall, a residence club bringing like-minded people together to preserve the Victorian building was considered the best option. Membership prices are between $1.3 and $3.3 million dependent upon the size of the flat, its view and its position within the building. Services were to include butlers, housekeeping, chefs, private and communal dining, spa and treatments for men and women, club/library, games/billiards room and courtesy cars.

By October 2008, Hamilton Hall had seen no renovation work and was in a state of disrepair. Several windows were broken or gone, leaving the inside open to the perils of Scottish weather, and the facade of the building was deteriorating. Many local residents have moved for the sale of Hamilton Hall from the owners and developers of the St. Andrews Grand, Wasserman Real Estate Capital, LLC.

In early 2009 a Scottish-based property development company took on the project management. A significantly revised plan (which included keeping the name 'Hamilton Hall') was to result in the development of 12 large and very luxurious apartments, in keeping with the history and traditions of St Andrews. A public announcement of the revised plan was expected in the spring of 2009.

The development did not take place. Having been repossessed by the bank, the property was to be put up for sale again. Jones Lang LaSalle in Scotland was selected by the lender (Heritable Creditor) to place the property on the market beginning in June 2009.

In December 2009 Hamilton Hall was acquired by US businessman Herb Kohler who intended to restore the building. In January 2011, Kohler announced that the building is renamed Hamilton Grand and presented the plan to convert it into 26 luxury apartments. The building opened in May 2013 and included Hams Hame, a basement pub and grill, open to the public. By the following month half of the apartments had been sold.

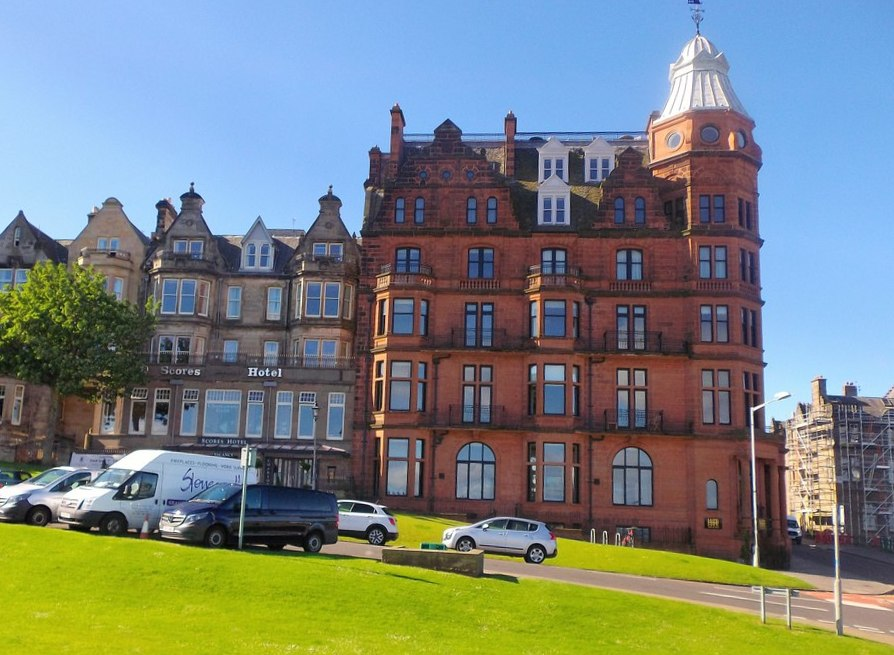
The northern end: Scores Hotel (left), Hamilton Grand (right)

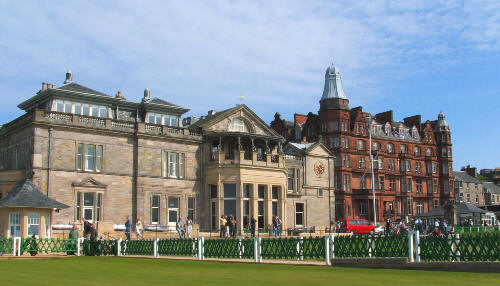
Hamilton Grand (right), the Royal and Ancient Golf clubhouse (left)

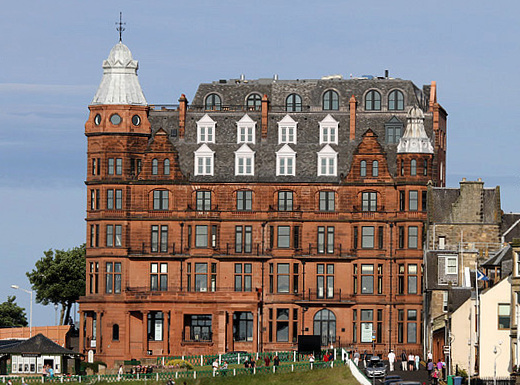
The western end

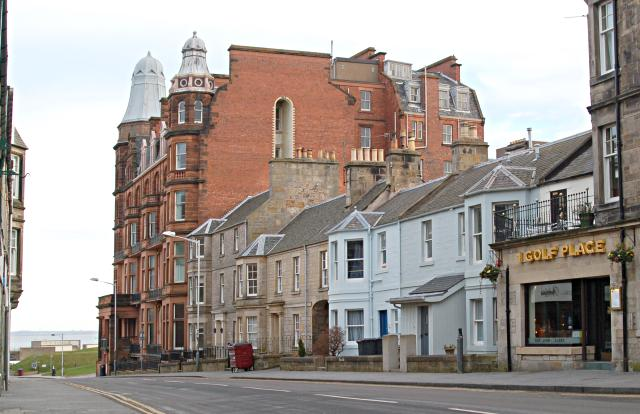
The eastern end
